= The Conan Chronicles =

Book by Robert E. Howard

- Cover of first edition
- Author: Robert E. Howard, L. Sprague de Camp, Lin Carter
- Cover artist: Blas Gallego
- Language: English
- Series: Conan the Barbarian
- Genre: Sword and sorcery
- Publisher: Sphere Books
- Publication date: 1989
- Publication place: United Kingdom
- Media type: Print (paperback)
- Pages: 569 pp
- ISBN: 0-7474-0547-6
- OCLC: 33073944
- Followed by: The Conan Chronicles 2

The Conan Chronicles is a 1989 omnibus collection of three fantasy collections by American writers Robert E. Howard, L. Sprague de Camp and Lin Carter, featuring Howard's seminal sword and sorcery hero Conan the Barbarian, published by Sphere Books. The component collections had originally been published by Lancer Books in 1967, 1968 and 1969, and later reissued by Ace Books. The omnibus collection was followed by The Conan Chronicles 2.

== Contents ==
- Conan (Robert E. Howard, L. Sprague de Camp and Lin Carter)

- "Introduction" (L. Sprague de Camp)
- "Letter from Robert E. Howard to P. Schuyler Miller" (Robert E. Howard)
- "The Hyborian Age, Part 1" (Robert E. Howard)
- "The Thing in the Crypt" (L. Sprague de Camp and Lin Carter)
- "The Tower of the Elephant" (Robert E. Howard)
- "The Hall of the Dead" (Robert E. Howard and L. Sprague de Camp)
- "The God in the Bowl" (Robert E. Howard)
- "Rogues in the House" (Robert E. Howard)
- "The Hand of Nergal" (Robert E. Howard and Lin Carter)
- "The City of Skulls" (L. Sprague de Camp and Lin Carter)

- Conan of Cimmeria (Robert E. Howard, L. Sprague de Camp and Lin Carter)

- "Introduction" (L. Sprague de Camp)
- "The Curse of the Monolith" (L. Sprague de Camp and Lin Carter)
- "The Blood-Stained God" (Robert E. Howard and L. Sprague de Camp)
- "The Frost-Giant's Daughter" (Robert E. Howard, edited by L. Sprague de Camp)
- "The Lair of the Ice Worm" (L. Sprague de Camp and Lin Carter)
- "Queen of the Black Coast" (Robert E. Howard)
- "The Vale of Lost Women" (Robert E. Howard)
- "The Castle of Terror" (L. Sprague de Camp and Lin Carter)
- "The Snout in the Dark" (Robert E. Howard, L. Sprague de Camp and Lin Carter)

- Conan the Freebooter (Robert E. Howard and L. Sprague de Camp)

- "Introduction" (L. Sprague de Camp)
- "Hawks over Shem" (Robert E. Howard and L. Sprague de Camp)
- "Black Colossus" (Robert E. Howard)
- "Shadows in the Moonlight" (Robert E. Howard)
- "The Road of the Eagles" (Robert E. Howard and L. Sprague de Camp)
- "A Witch Shall be Born" (Robert E. Howard)
