= Shadows in the Dark (Conan story) =

- Short story by L. Sprague de Camp and Lin Carter
- Country: United States
- Language: English
- Genre: Fantasy

Publication
- Published in: Conan the Swordsman
- Publication type: Collection
- Publisher: Bantam Books
- Media type: Print (Paperback)
- Publication date: 1978
- Series: Conan the Barbarian

"Shadows in the Dark" is a short story by American writers L. Sprague de Camp and Lin Carter, featuring the fictional sword and sorcery hero Conan the Barbarian created by Robert E. Howard. It was first published by Bantam Books in the paperback collection Conan the Swordsman in August 1978. Later paperback editions of the collection were issued by Ace Books (1987 and 1991). The first hardcover edition was published by Tor Books in 2002. The book has also been translated into Italian. It was later gathered together with Conan the Liberator and Conan and the Spider God into the omnibus collection Sagas of Conan (Tor Books, 2004).

== Plot ==
Following the events of "Black Colossus", Conan leads a small band of warriors to rescue King Khossus of Khoraja from his Ophirean captors. Their quest is progressing unusually well, which raises Conan's suspicions. Soon, Conan discovers that one of his comrades is an agent of the enemy, and realizes he will have to go it alone on his quest.

| Preceded by "Black Colossus" | Complete Conan Saga (William Galen Gray chronology) | Succeeded by The Road of Kings |
