= Conan chronologies =

Chronologies for the timeline in Conan stories

This article covers some of the major Conan chronologies that have been advanced over the years. From the 1930s onward a number of fans and scholars have analyzed the numerous Conan the Barbarian stories by Robert E. Howard and later writers, and attempted to organize them into a chronological timeline.

Going beyond a simple fan activity, these efforts have had a significant impact on the development of the popular conception of the character of Conan as well as economic consequences on the Conan franchise. As Paolo Bertetti observes, the focus on the creation of a character chronology outside the work of the original author begins a "process that tends to transform the character into a social object of inter-individual construction and public debate, rendering it independent of texts in which it was born," and in the case of Conan, this has led to the exploitation of the character for commercial reasons and perhaps encouraged and justified the proliferation of pastiche stories and novels over the years.

A number of factors have prevented the establishment of a consensus on the order of the Conan stories, most notably the fact that Howard himself apparently had little more than a general idea of the character's career path and intentionally wrote the stories out of chronological sequence.

Clearly, the stories where Conan is a thief are at the early part of his career and those of King Conan – in the later part. But the middle part – the various tales of his being a pirate, brigand, and mercenary at various locations around the world – are more difficult to arrange in neat order. While the earliest (Miller/Clark) timeline had at least partial endorsement from Howard, the addition of stories discovered and published after Howard's death in 1936 are more difficult to place. Fragments and synopses that were never completed are even more problematic and some contain what appear to be internal inconsistencies.

== Miller/Clark/de Camp chronologies ==
The essay A Probable Outline of Conan's Career (1936) was completed during Howard's lifetime by P. Schuyler Miller and John D. Clark. Howard, who reviewed it in the draft and made a few corrections, stated it followed his vision of Conan's career "pretty closely." The version subsequently published in the Howard fanzine The Hyborian Age (1938) incorporated Howard's corrections.

Over the years, Miller and Clark revised the chronology with L. Sprague de Camp to take into account additional Conan material, including previously unpublished stories by Howard and newly written stories by others. These revised versions of the chronology guided the order in which the stories were arranged when they were compiled into book form in the early series published by Gnome Press (1950–1957), Lancer/Ace (1966–1977), and Bantam (1978–1982), and text from the chronology was used in these series to bridge gaps between the stories.

The subsequent versions include An Informal Biography of Conan the Cimmerian (1952), a revision by Clark and de Camp used to bridge stories in the first hardcover edition of the Conan stories, published by Gnome Press. De Camp's final version of the chronology, Conan the Indestructible (1984), incorporated the first seven volumes of the series of Conan pastiches published by Tor Books.

While the chronology had Howard's general approval in regard to its placement of the stories covered by its earliest published version, such authority is lacking for later versions' placement of stories discovered after Howard's death. Most post-Howard Conan stories were written to conform to it. The chronology has been criticized for missing some in-story chronological indications pointing to a slightly different arrangement (such as "Xuthal of the Dusk" preceding "The Devil in Iron"), for force-fitting posthumously discovered Howard tales into its scheme (e.g. "The Black Stranger," in which Howard has Conan turn pirate between his stints as general and king in Aquilonia, rewritten by de Camp to omit the piratical interlude), and for having Conan wander "all over the Hyborian world in a scattered and illogical pattern, and at a break-neck pace."

=== Order (earliest and latest forms) ===
All stories added after the earliest version are indented, stories written by people other than Howard are marked with an asterisk, and stories written by Howard but published after his death are marked with a dagger (†).

- "Legions of the Dead"*
- Conan the Barbarian* (as an alternate account of Conan's early years)
- "The Thing in the Crypt"*

- "The Tower of the Elephant"

- Conan the Destroyer*
- Conan the Magnificent*
- Conan the Invincible*
- "The Hall of the Dead"†
- "The God in the Bowl"†

- "Rogues in the House"

- Conan and the Sorcerer*
- Conan the Mercenary*
- The Sword of Skelos*
- Conan the Victorious*
- Conan the Unconquered*
- "The Hand of Nergal"†
- "The City of Skulls"*
- "The People of the Summit"*
- "The Curse of the Monolith"*
- Conan and the Spider God*
- "The Blood-Stained God"*
- "The Frost-Giant's Daughter"
- "The Lair of the Ice Worm"*
- Conan the Defender*
- Conan the Triumphant*

- "Queen of the Black Coast" (Part 1)

- Conan the Rebel* (between chapters 1 and 2 of "Queen of the Black Coast")

- "Queen of the Black Coast" (Part 2)

- "The Vale of Lost Women"†
- "The Castle of Terror"*
- "The Snout in the Dark"†
- "Hawks Over Shem"*
- The Road of Kings*

- "Black Colossus"

- "Shadows in the Dark"*

- "Shadows in the Moonlight"

- "The Road of the Eagles"†

- "A Witch Shall Be Born"

- "Black Tears"*

- "Shadows in Zamboula"

- "The Star of Khorala"*

- "The Devil in Iron"

- "The Flame Knife"†

- "The People of the Black Circle"
- "The Slithering Shadow"

- "Drums of Tombalku"†
- "The Gem in the Tower"*

- "The Pool of the Black One"

- Conan the Buccaneer*

- "Red Nails"
- "Jewels of Gwahlur"

- "The Ivory Goddess"*

- "Beyond the Black River"

- "Moon of Blood"*
- "The Treasure of Tranicos"†
- "Wolves Beyond the Border"†
- Conan the Liberator*

- "The Phoenix on the Sword"
- "The Scarlet Citadel"
- Conan the Conqueror

- Conan the Avenger*
- "The Witch of the Mists"*
- "Black Sphinx of Nebthu"*
- "Red Moon of Zembabwei"*
- "Shadows in the Skull"*
- Conan of the Isles*

== Robert Jordan chronology ==
A Conan Chronology by Robert Jordan (1987) was the attempt of Conan writer Robert Jordan to create a new Chronology including all Conan material written up to that point, including fifteen of the first sixteen volumes of the series of Conan pastiches published by Tor Books (omitting the eighth, Conan the Valorous). It was first published in Conan the Defiant, by Steve Perry (Tor Books, 1987). It was heavily influenced by the Miller/Clark/de Camp chronology, though deviating from it in some respects, and covers more of the Tor series. Jordan seldom provided his reasoning on his departures from the earlier chronology.

=== Order ===
- "Legions of the Dead"
- "The Thing in the Crypt"
- Conan the Defiant
- "The Tower of the Elephant"
- Conan and the Sorcerer
- Conan the Mercenary
- Conan: The Sword of Skelos
- Conan the Destroyer
- Conan the Magnificent
- Conan the Invincible
- "The Hall of the Dead"
- Conan the Fearless
- "The God in the Bowl"
- Conan the Warlord
- Conan the Champion
- "Rogues in the House"
- Conan the Victorious
- Conan the Unconquered
- "The Hand of Nergal"
- "The City of Skulls"
- "The People of the Summit"
- "The Curse of the Monolith"
- Conan the Valiant
- "The Blood-Stained God"
- "The Frost-Giant's Daughter"
- "The Lair of the Ice Worm"
- Conan and the Spider God
- Conan the Defender
- Conan: The Road of Kings
- Conan the Triumphant
- "Queen of the Black Coast" (Part 1)
- Conan the Rebel
- "Queen of the Black Coast" (Part 2)
- "The Vale of Lost Women"
- "The Castle of Terror"
- "The Snout in the Dark"
- "Hawks Over Shem"
- "Black Colossus"
- "Shadows in the Dark"
- Conan the Renegade
- "Shadows in the Moonlight"
- "The Road of the Eagles"
- "A Witch Shall be Born"
- "Black Tears"
- "Shadows in Zamboula"
- Conan the Raider
- "The Star of Khorala"
- "The Devil in Iron"
- "The Flame Knife"
- "The People of the Black Circle"
- Conan the Marauder
- "The Slithering Shadow"
- "Drums of Tombalku"
- "The Gem in the Tower"
- "The Pool of the Black One"
- Conan the Buccaneer
- "Red Nails"
- "Jewels of Gwahlur"
- "The Ivory Goddess"
- "Beyond the Black River"
- "Moon of Blood"
- "The Treasure of Tranicos"
- "Wolves Beyond the Border"
- Conan the Liberator
- "The Phoenix on the Sword"
- "The Scarlet Citadel"
- The Hour of the Dragon
- The Return of Conan
- "The Witch of the Mists"
- "Black Sphinx of Nebthu"
- "Red Moon of Zembabwei"
- "Shadows in the Skull"
- Conan of the Isles

== William Galen Gray chronology ==
Timeline of Conan's Journeys (1997, revised in 2004), was William Galen Gray's attempt to create "a chronology of all the stories, both Howard and pastiche". It is based on a close reading of all the stories and drawing on the earlier Miller/Clark/de Camp and Jordan chronologies. Where the earlier chronologies differ Gray sometimes adopts one's placement, sometimes the other, and occasionally departs from both, in each case explaining his reasons for the placement. The Gray chronology incorporated all then-published Conan stories, including all the Tor volumes, but treated inconsistently Tor pastiches whose portrayals of Conan's early life contradict Howard's account of it. Three of these, the movie adaptations Conan the Barbarian and Conan the Destroyer and the John M. Roberts novel Conan the Bold, Gray rejected as apocryphal "Legends." The fourth, Harry Turtledove's Conan of Venarium, he accepted.

=== Order ===
- Conan of Venarium
- "Legions of the Dead"
- "The Thing in the Crypt"
- Conan the Defiant
- Conan the Hunter
- Conan the Indomitable
- Conan the Free Lance
- Conan the Formidable
- "The Tower of the Elephant"
- Conan and the Sorcerer
- Conan the Mercenary
- Conan: The Sword of Skelos
- Conan the Outcast
- Conan the Magnificent
- Conan the Invincible
- "The Hall of the Dead"
- Conan the Fearless
- "The God in the Bowl"
- Conan the Warlord
- "Rogues in the House"
- Conan the Victorious
- Conan the Unconquered
- "The Hand of Nergal"
- "The City of Skulls"
- Conan the Hero
- "The People of the Summit"
- "The Curse of the Monolith"
- Conan the Valiant
- Conan and the Spider God
- "The Blood-Stained God"
- Conan the Valorous
- "The Frost-Giant's Daughter"
- "The Lair of the Ice Worm"
- Conan the Relentless
- Conan the Savage
- Conan the Defender
- Conan the Triumphant
- Conan the Guardian
- "Queen of the Black Coast" (part 1)
- Conan the Rebel
- "Queen of the Black Coast" (part 2)
- Conan at the Demon's Gate
- "The Vale of Lost Women"
- "The Castle of Terror"
- "The Snout in the Dark"
- Conan the Gladiator
- Conan and the Emerald Lotus
- "Hawks Over Shem"
- "Black Colossus"
- "Shadows in the Dark"
- Conan: The Road of Kings
- Conan the Renegade
- "Shadows in the Moonlight"
- Conan of the Red Brotherhood
- Conan, Scourge of the Bloody Coast
- Conan the Champion
- "The Road of the Eagles"
- "A Witch Shall be Born"
- "Black Tears"
- Conan and the Manhunters
- "Shadows in Zamboula"
- Conan the Raider
- "The Star of Khorala"
- Conan and the Death Lord of Thanza
- Conan and the Amazon
- "The Devil in Iron"
- "The Flame Knife"
- Conan and the Shaman's Curse
- "The People of the Black Circle"
- Conan the Marauder
- Conan and the Mists of Doom
- "The Slithering Shadow"
- "Drums of Tombalku"
- "The Gem in the Tower"
- Conan and the Grim Grey God
- "The Pool of the Black One"
- Conan the Buccaneer
- "Red Nails"
- Conan and the Gods of the Mountain
- "Jewels of Gwahlur"
- "The Ivory Goddess"
- Conan and the Treasure of Python
- Conan, Lord of the Black River
- Conan the Rogue
- "Beyond the Black River"
- "Moon of Blood"
- "The Treasure of Tranicos"
- "Wolves Beyond the Border"
- Conan the Liberator
- "The Phoenix on the Sword"
- "The Scarlet Citadel"
- The Hour of the Dragon
- The Return of Conan
- Conan the Great
- "The Witch of the Mists"
- "Black Sphinx of Nebthu"
- "Red Moon of Zembabwei"
- "Shadows in the Skull"
- Conan of the Isles

Apocryphal:

- Conan the Barbarian
- Conan the Bold
- Conan the Destroyer

== Joe Marek chronology ==
Joe Marek's chronology is limited to stories written (or devised) by Howard, though within that context it is essentially a revision of the Miller/Clark/de Camp tradition. Noting Howard's general approval of the Miller/Clark chronology, he tends to follow it when it does not contradict the internal evidence of the stories or force Conan into what he perceives as a "mad dash" around the Hyborian world within timeframes too rapid to be credible. Marek considers four changes from this chronology as central to his own:

1. that "The Frost-Giant's Daughter" is the first Conan tale.
2. that the four thief stories ("The Tower of the Elephant", "The Hall of the Dead", "The God in the Bowl" and "Rogues in the House") occur in a direct east-to-west sequence (note, however, that this is not really a change; while other chronologies may intersperse pastiches in the sequence, all except the Dale Rippke chronology place these stories in the same order).
3. that "Xuthal Of The Dusk" (a.k.a. "The Slithering Shadow") has to occur before "The Devil In Iron", as the events of the former are referenced by Conan in the latter.
4. that "The Vale Of Lost Women" occurs later in the series than previously assumed.

Marek provides arguments for his story placements, though he fails to incorporate into his scheme the chronologically wide gap between "Beyond the Black River" and "Wolves Beyond the Border" he admits to being indicated by Howard's version of "The Black Stranger" as he believed doing anything more to filling the hole would require a major reordering of the stories that would take attention away from his four primary changes. Additionally, Marek divided his timeline into five parts that would constitute about 250 paperback pages each.

=== Order ===
The Coming of Conan

- "The Hyborian Age, Part One"
- "Cimmeria" (poem)
- "The Frost-Giant's Daughter"
- "The Tower of the Elephant"
- "The Hall of the Dead" (fragment)
- "The God in the Bowl"
- "Rogues in the House"
- "The Hand of Nergal" (fragment)
- "Black Colossus"
- "Queen of the Black Coast"
- "The Snout in the Dark" (fragment)
- "Shadows in the Moonlight"

Conan the Barbarian

- "A Witch Shall Be Born"
- "Shadows in Zamboula"
- "Xuthal of the Dusk"
- "The Devil in Iron"
- "The People of the Black Circle"

The Sword of Conan

- "Drums of Tombalku" (fragment)
- "The Vale of Lost Women"
- "The Pool of the Black One"
- "Red Nails"
- "The Teeth of Gwahlur"

King Conan

- "Beyond the Black River"
- "The Black Stranger"
- "Wolves Beyond the Border" (fragment)
- "The Phoenix on the Sword"
- "The Scarlet Citadel"

Conan The Conqueror

- The Hour of the Dragon
- "The Hyborian Age, Part Two"
- "Notes On Various Peoples of The Hyborian Age"
- Letters

== Dale Rippke chronology ==
In 2003 Dale Rippke published The Darkstorm Conan Chronology, a completely revised chronology, including only those stories written (or devised) by Howard. Completions of Howard works by other hands and post-Howard works are not included. Rippke bases his story placements on the texts as Howard wrote them, which leads him to some of the same conclusions as Marek. Most of his differences with Marek fall in the middle of their respective efforts. This is used as the basis for the Conan Dark Horse comic series, which mostly follows this chronology.

=== Order ===
- "The Frost-Giant's Daughter"
- "The God in the Bowl"
- "The Tower of the Elephant"
- "The Hall of the Dead" (synopsis)
- "Rogues in the House"
- "The Hand of Nergal" (fragment)
- "Shadows in the Moonlight"
- "Black Colossus"
- "Queen of the Black Coast"
- "The Snout in the Dark" (fragment)
- "The Slithering Shadow"
- "A Witch Shall Be Born"
- "The Devil in Iron"
- "The People of the Black Circle"
- "Shadows in Zamboula"
- "Drums of Tombalku" (fragment)
- "The Vale of Lost Women"
- "The Pool of the Black One"
- "Beyond the Black River"
- "The Black Stranger"
- "Red Nails"
- "Jewels of Gwahlur"
- "Wolves Beyond the Border" (fragment)
- "The Phoenix on the Sword"
- "The Scarlet Citadel"
- "The Hour of the Dragon"

== Compared order ==
Story	REH's writing order	Rippke	Marek	de Camp	Jordan	Gray	Notes
The Hyborian Age, Part One	–	–	01	–	–	–	historical essay, portion covering the period before Conan's time
Cimmeria (poem)	–	–	02	–	–		poem establishing, describing and meditating on Conan's birthplace; placed before the stories in the collection The Coming of Conan the Cimmerian
Conan the Barbarian (2011 novel) (part 1)	–	–	–	–	–	–	film adaptation; chapters 1–11 cover Conan's early life from birth to the eve of Venarium
Conan of Venarium	–	–	–	–	–	01	final chapters contradict Howard's account (and all others) of Conan's first entry into the civilized countries – Conan was about 14/15 at the Battle of Venarium per the Miller/Clark/de Camp chronology
Conan the Bold	–	–	–	–	–	A	contradicts Howard's account (and all others) of Conan's first entry into the civilized countries; would go between Conan of Venarium and "Legions of the Dead" if anywhere
"Legions of the Dead"	–	–	–	01	01	02	
Conan the Barbarian (1982 novel)	–	–	–	02	–	A	film adaptation contradicting Howard's account (and all others) of Conan's early life; treated by de Camp as an alternative account
"The Thing in the Crypt"	–	–	–	03	02	03	
Conan the Defiant	–	–	–	–	03	04	
Conan the Hunter	–	–	–	–	–	05	
Conan the Indomitable	–	–	–	–	–	06	
Conan the Free Lance	–	–	–	–	–	07	
Conan the Formidable	–	–	–	–	–	08	
"The Tower of the Elephant"	04	03	04	04	04	09	
Conan and the Sorcerer	–	–	–	11	05	10	Conan's age and internal references in the story fit Jordan's placement; de Camp argues Conan's behavior is too mature for his depicted age and places it later – – Conan was about 17 according to Offutt and 23 according to de Camp, per the Miller/Clark/de Camp chronology
Conan the Mercenary	–	–	–	12	06	11	Conan's age and internal references in the story fit Jordan's placement; de Camp argues Conan's behavior is too mature for his depicted age and places it later
Conan: The Sword of Skelos	–	–	–	13	07	12	Conan's age and internal references in the story fit Jordan's placement; de Camp argues Conan's behavior is too mature for his depicted age and places it later
Conan the Destroyer	–	–	–	05	08	A	film adaptation; sequel to the 1982 Conan the Barbarian novel and a poor fit chronologically as anything but that, though de Camp and Jordan work it into their schemes regardless
Conan the Outcast	–	–	–	–	–	13	
Conan the Magnificent	–	–	–	06	09	14	
Conan the Invincible	–	–	–	07	10	15	
"The Hall of the Dead"	*	04	05	08	11	16	early fragment not published in Howard's lifetime
Conan the Fearless	–	–	–	–	12	17	
"The God in the Bowl"	03	02	06	09	13	18	
Conan the Warlord	–	–	–	–	14	19	
"Rogues in the House"	11	05	07	10	16	20	
Conan the Victorious	–	–	–	14	17	21	
Conan the Unconquered	–	–	–	15	18	22	
"The Hand of Nergal"	*	06	08	16	19	23	early fragment not published in Howard's lifetime
"The City of Skulls"	–	–	–	17	20	24	
Conan the Hero	–	–	–	–	–	25	
"The People of the Summit"	–	–	–	18	21	26	
"The Curse of the Monolith"	–	–	–	19	22	27	
Conan the Valiant	–	–	–	–	23	28	
Conan and the Spider God	–	–	–	20	27	29	
"The Blood-Stained God"	–	–	–	21	24	30	
Conan the Valorous	–	–	–	–	–	31	
"The Frost-Giant's Daughter"	02	01	03	22	25	32	
"The Lair of the Ice Worm"	–	–	–	23	26	33	
Conan the Relentless	–	–	–	–	–	34	
Conan the Savage	–	–	–	–	–	35	
Conan the Defender	–	–	–	24	28	36	
Conan the Triumphant	–	–	–	25	30	37	
Conan the Guardian	–	–	–	–	–	38	
"Queen of the Black Coast" (chapter 1)	06a	09a	10a	26	31	39	
Conan the Rebel	–	–	–	27	32	40	
"Queen of the Black Coast" (chapters 2–5)	06b	09b	10b	28	33	41	
Conan at the Demon's Gate (main narrative)	–	–	–	–	–	42	
"The Vale of Lost Women"	12	17	19	29	34	43	
"The Castle of Terror"	–	–	–	30	35	44	
"The Snout in the Dark"	*	10	11	31	36	45	early fragment not published in Howard's lifetime
Conan the Barbarian (2011 novel) (part 2)	–	–	–	–	–	–	film adaptation; chapters 12–33 set in the wake of Conan's piratical career on the Black Coast and subsequent sojourn in the Black Kingdoms
Conan the Gladiator	–	–	–	–	–	46	
Conan and the Emerald Lotus	–	–	–	–	–	47	
"Hawks Over Shem"	–	–	–	32	37	48	
"Black Colossus"	07	08	09	34	38	49	
"Shadows in the Dark"	–	–	–	35	39	50	Conan was nearly 30 at this time per the Miller/Clark/de Camp chronology
Conan: The Road of Kings	–	–	–	33	29	51	
Conan the Renegade	–	–	–	–	40	52	
"Shadows in the Moonlight"	08	07	12	36	41	53	
Conan of the Red Brotherhood	–	–	–	–	–	54	
Conan, Scourge of the Bloody Coast	–	–	–	–	–	55	
Conan the Champion	–	–	–	–	15	56	
"The Road of the Eagles"	–	–	–	37	42	57	
"A Witch Shall be Born"	16	12	13	38	43	58	Conan was about 30 at this time per the Miller/Clark/de Camp chronology
"Black Tears"	–	–	–	39	44	59	Conan was about 32 at this time per the Miller/Clark/de Camp chronology
Conan and the Manhunters	–	–	–	–	–	60	
"Shadows in Zamboula"	20	15	14	40	45	61	
Conan the Raider	–	–	–	–	46	62	
"The Star of Khorala"	–	–	–	41	47	63	
Conan and the Death Lord of Thanza	–	–	–	–	–	64	
Conan and the Amazon	–	–	–	–	–	65	
"The Devil in Iron"	13	13	16	42	48	66	
"The Flame Knife"	–	–	–	43	49	67	
Conan and the Shaman's Curse	–	–	–	–	–	68	
"The People of the Black Circle"	14	14	17	44	50	69	Conan was in his early 30s at this time per the Miller/Clark/de Camp chronology
Conan the Marauder	–	–	–	–	51	70	
Conan and the Mists of Doom	–	–	–	–	–	71	
"The Slithering Shadow"	09	11	15	45	52	72	
"Drums of Tombalku"	*	16	18	46	53	73	fragment not published in Howard's lifetime
"The Gem in the Tower"	–	–	–	47	54	74	Conan was about 35 at this time per the Miller/Clark/de Camp chronology
Conan and the Grim Grey God	–	–	–	–	–	75	
"The Pool of the Black One"	10	18	20	48	55	76	Conan was about 37 at this time per the Miller/Clark/de Camp chronology
Conan the Buccaneer	–	–	–	49	56	77	Conan was in his late 30s at this time per the Miller/Clark/de Camp chronology
"Red Nails"	21	21	21	50	57	78	
Conan and the Gods of the Mountain	–	–	–	–	–	79	
"Jewels of Gwahlur"	17	22	22	51	58	80	
"The Ivory Goddess"	–	–	–	52	59	81	
Conan and the Treasure of Python	–	–	–	–	–	82	
Conan, Lord of the Black River	–	–	–	–	–	83	
Conan the Rogue	–	–	–	–	–	84	
"Beyond the Black River"	18	19	23	53	60	85	Conan was about 39 at this time per the Miller/Clark/de Camp chronology
"Moon of Blood"	–	–	–	54	61	86	
"The Treasure of Tranicos" "The Black Stranger"	19	20	24	55	62	87	
"Wolves Beyond the Border"	*	23	25	56	63	88	draft not published in Howard's lifetime
Conan the Liberator	–	–	–	57	64	89	Conan was in his early 40s at this time per the Miller/Clark/de Camp chronology
"The Phoenix on the Sword"	01	24	26	58	65	90	
"The Scarlet Citadel"	05	25	27	59	66	91	
The Hour of the Dragon	15	26	28	60	67	92	Conan was about 45 at this time per the Miller/Clark/de Camp chronology
The Return of Conan	–	–	–	61	68	93	
Conan the Great	–	–	–	–	–	94	time setting indicated in-piece to be between The Return of Conan and "The Witch of the Mists"
"The Witch of the Mists"	–	–	–	62	69	95	Conan was in his late 50s at this time per the Miller/Clark/de Camp chronology
"Black Sphinx of Nebthu"	–	–	–	63	70	96	
"Red Moon of Zembabwei"	–	–	–	64	71	97	
"Shadows in the Skull"	–	–	–	65	72	98	
Conan of the Isles	–	–	–	66	73	99	Conan was in his 60s at this time per the Miller/Clark/de Camp chronology
Conan at the Demon's Gate (frame sequence)	–	–	–	–	–	–	time setting stated in-piece to be six years after Conan's abdication from the Aquilonian throne and into the reign of his successor
Death-Song of Conan the Cimmerian (poem)	–	–	–	–	–	–	time setting indicated in-piece to occur at Conan's death
The Hyborian Age, Part Two	–	–	29	–	–	–	historical essay, portion covering the period after Conan's time
Notes On Various Peoples of the Hyborian Age	–	–	30	–	–	–	
Letters	–	–	31	–	–	–	
