= Moon of Blood =

- Short story by L. Sprague de Camp and Lin Carter
- Country: United States
- Language: English
- Genre: Sword and sorcery

Publication
- Published in: Conan the Swordsman
- Publication type: Collection
- Publisher: Bantam Books
- Media type: Print (Paperback)
- Publication date: 1978
- Series: Conan the Barbarian

"Moon of Blood" is a short story by American writers L. Sprague de Camp and Lin Carter, featuring the fictional sword and sorcery hero Conan the Barbarian created by Robert E. Howard. It was first published by Bantam Books in the paperback collection Conan the Swordsman in August 1978. Later paperback editions of the collection were issued by Ace Books (1987 and 1991). The first hardcover edition was published by Tor Books in 2002. The book has also been translated into Italian. It was later gathered together with Conan the Liberator and Conan and the Spider God into the omnibus collection Sagas of Conan (Tor Books, 2004).

== Plot ==
As the Picts west of the kingdom of Aquilonia gather to attack the frontier fort of Velitrium, Conan's Aquilonian scouting party is ambushed by a massive Pictish war party, and then by venomous snakes conjured by the shaman Sagyetha, nephew of the late Zogar Sag. Conan and Flavius, one of his fellow captains, escape the ambush by hiding in a Pictish council site to discern the enemy's plans. As multiple tribes gather at the site, Conan discovers his men were betrayed by one of their own, Edric, who is working for Lucian, an Aquilonian viscount, the temporary governor of Conajohara, and Conan's general. Lucian has promised to deliver the province of Schonia to the Picts, in return for the delivery of Valannius' payment of gold from the destroyed Fort Tuscelan (to pay off his heavy gambling debts) and the elimination of Thasperas, the governor of Schonia and his primary rival.

Once Edric is gone and the Picts are busy with their war rituals, Conan and Flavius retreat to Velitrium and report the plot to their fellow captains, Laodamas and Glyco. The four of them ambush Edric's party carrying the chest, capture the money and traitorous scout and make him confess. Even though Laodamas remains skeptical, Conan confronts and exposes Lucian, who flees. Taking command, Conan rallies his men and leads them into the wild against the encroaching Picts. After a skirmish, Conan tells his men to hold their position while he sneaks behind enemy lines. Although bitten by a snake, he takes Sagyetha by surprise, decapitates him, and takes the severed head back to his own lines to use it to demoralize the Pictish warriors.

In the midst of the final charge, Conan passes out from the venom, but his men are victorious. As Conan wakes, he finds himself promoted to general of Conajohara's garrison and invited to a feast at King Numedides' court.

== Adaptations ==
- The story was adapted by Roy Thomas, Ernie Colón and Tony DeZuniga in Savage Sword of Conan #46, November 1979.
- "Moon of Blood" is also the template for a GURPS Conan adventure of the same name.

== Sources ==
- Laughlin, Charlotte; Daniel J. H. Levack (1983). De Camp: An L. Sprague de Camp Bibliography. San Francisco: Underwood/Miller. p. 212.

Preceded by "Beyond the Black River"	Complete Conan Saga (William Galen Gray chronology)	Succeeded by "The Treasure of Tranicos"
