= The Ivory Goddess =

- Short story by L. Sprague de Camp and Lin Carter
- Country: United States
- Language: English
- Genre: Fantasy

Publication
- Published in: Conan the Swordsman
- Publication type: Collection
- Publisher: Bantam Books
- Media type: Print (Paperback)
- Publication date: 1978
- Series: Conan the Barbarian

"The Ivory Goddess" is a short story by American writers L. Sprague de Camp and Lin Carter, featuring the fictional sword and sorcery hero Conan the Barbarian created by Robert E. Howard. According to Morgan Holmes, citing de Camp friend Loay Hall, Carter did none of the writing, and the story was written by de Camp in collaboration with his wife Catherine Crook de Camp. The story was first published by Bantam Books in the paperback anthology Conan the Swordsman in August 1978. Later paperback editions of the collection were issued by Ace Books (1987 and 1991). The first hardcover edition was published by Tor Books in 2002. The book has also been translated into Italian. It was later gathered together with Conan the Liberator and Conan and the Spider God into the omnibus collection Sagas of Conan (Tor Books, 2004). The story has been translated into Italian.

== Plot summary ==
After the events of "Jewels of Gwahlur", Conan and his current companion Muriela, whom he rescued in Keshan, travel to Punt where he plan on passing her off as the natives' ivory goddess to con them out of their gold. The current occupant of the goddess role turns out to have her own scheme, however, and other forces are also in play. In the end, Muriela appears to carry off the masquerade successfully, but is she truly playing a role, or has she been possessed by the true goddess? Even Conan is uncertain, but as the new goddess is inclined to defend her property and has the upper hand, he decides discretion is the better part of valor, and must depart Punt with neither girl nor treasure. He bids farewell to Muriela and travels south.

== Adaptation ==
The story was adapted by Roy Thomas, John Buscema and Danny Bulanadi in Savage Sword of Conan #60, January 1981.

== Notes ==
Preceded by Jewels of Gwahlur	Complete Conan Saga (William Galen Gray chronology)	Succeeded by Conan and the Treasure of Python
