= The Star of Khorala =

- Short story by L. Sprague de Camp and Björn Nyberg
- Country: United States
- Language: English
- Genre: Fantasy

Publication
- Published in: Conan the Swordsman
- Publication type: Collection
- Publisher: Bantam Books
- Media type: Print (Paperback)
- Publication date: 1978
- Series: Conan the Barbarian

"The Star of Khorala" is a short story by Björn Nyberg and L. Sprague de Camp, featuring the fictional sword and sorcery hero Conan the Barbarian created by Robert E. Howard. It was first published by Bantam Books in the paperback collection Conan the Swordsman in August 1978. Later paperback editions of the collection were issued by Ace Books (1987 and 1991). The first hardcover edition was published by Tor Books in 2002. It was later gathered together with Conan the Liberator and Conan and the Spider God into the omnibus collection Sagas of Conan (Tor Books, 2004).

== Plot ==
During the events of "Shadows in Zamboula" and Conan the Raider, Conan journeys into Ophir with a fabulous jewel called the "Star of Khorala", knowing it was formerly owned by Queen Marala of Ophir, who will pay well for its return.

Once in Ophir, Conan learns that Marala has fallen from grace and been imprisoned. Freeing the queen, Conan escorts her west toward Aquilonia, where she has a hereditary fief on which she can begin life anew. However, before they can reach their destination the two are trapped inside a mysterious temple where the gem turns out to be a key in the fulfillment of an ancient prophecy.

In the end, Marala is restored to her ancestral estate in Aquilonia as the Countess Albiona. She will later play a role in the events of the novel Conan the Conqueror.

== Adaptation ==
The story was adapted for comics in the 44th issue of American magazine Savage Sword of Conan, in September 1979. It was written by Roy Thomas with interior art by Sal Buscema and Tony DeZuniga. Cover artwork was by Bob Larkin.

== Sources ==
- Laughlin, Charlotte; Daniel J. H. Levack (1983). De Camp: An L. Sprague de Camp Bibliography. San Francisco: Underwood/Miller. p. 243.
- The Star of Khorala title listing at the Internet Speculative Fiction Database

| Preceded by Conan the Raider | Complete Conan Saga (William Galen Gray chronology) | Succeeded by Conan and the Death Lord of Thanza |
