= Conan the Mercenary =

1981 novel by Andrew J. Offutt

- Cover of first edition
- Author: Andrew J. Offutt
- Illustrator: Esteban Maroto
- Cover artist: Sanjulián
- Language: English
- Series: Conan the Barbarian
- Genre: Sword and sorcery
- Publisher: Ace Books
- Publication date: 1981
- Publication place: United States
- ISBN: 0-441-11659-0

Conan the Mercenary is a fantasy novel written by American writer Andrew J. Offutt and illustrated by Esteban Maroto featuring Robert E. Howard's sword and sorcery hero Conan the Barbarian, the second volume in a trilogy beginning with Conan and the Sorcerer and concluding with The Sword of Skelos. It was first published in paperback by Ace Books in 1980, with an official publication date of January 1981. Ace reprinted the novel in April 1983, and issued a trade paperback edition in 1985. The first British edition was published by Sphere Books in July 1989.

== Plot ==
A young Conan finds himself involved in a plot against the throne of Khauran. After saving Lady Khashtris from an attack by Shadizar's thieves and traitorous servants, Conan agrees to work as her bodyguard in return for his soul being freed from the mirror it has been trapped in since his encounter with Hissar Zul. Conan's soul can only be freed by someone of noble birth, and Khashtris convinces Conan that her sister, Queen Ialamis, will free him.

Unknown to Conan, Ialamis, and Khashtris, the Queen's new paramour, Sergianus, is actually a disguised Sabaninus, the elderly Duke of Korveka, a Kothian province that wishes to annex Khauran. The disguise is revealed when the Queen breaks the mirror containing Conan's soul. As his soul re-enters him, Conan sees the Duke for who he really is. Conan, Lady Khashtris, and her loyal bodyguard Shubal, then plot to unmask the Duke and save Khauran.

Ialamis is also the mother of Salome and Taramis, who feature prominently in Howard's earlier tale, "A Witch Shall Be Born."

== Reception ==
Critic Don D'Ammassa calls the novel "[r]ather slow moving.."

== Adaptations ==
The story was adapted by Roy Thomas and Esteban Maroto in issues #217-218, cover-dated January–February 1994, of the Marvel Comics magazine series The Savage Sword of Conan. The Thomas/Maroto tale was later reprinted in the 2016 Dark Horse Comics trade paperback The Savage Sword of Conan Volume 21.

== Notes ==
Preceded by The Treasure of Tranicos	Ace Maroto Conan series (publication order)	Succeeded by The Flame Knife
Preceded by Conan and the Sorcerer	Complete Conan Saga (William Galen Gray chronology)	Succeeded by The Sword of Skelos
