= Conan the Swordsman =

1978 Bantam Books short story collection

- Cover of first edition
- Author: L. Sprague de Camp, Lin Carter and Björn Nyberg
- Illustrator: Tim Kirk
- Cover artist: Darral Greene
- Language: English
- Series: Conan the Barbarian
- Genre: Sword and sorcery
- Publisher: Bantam Books
- Publication date: 1978
- Publication place: United States
- Media type: Print (paperback)
- Pages: 274
- ISBN: 0-553-12018-2
- OCLC: 4173748

Conan the Swordsman is a collection of seven fantasy short stories and associated pieces by writers L. Sprague de Camp, Lin Carter and Björn Nyberg featuring Robert E. Howard's sword and sorcery hero Conan the Barbarian. It was first published in paperback by Bantam Books in August 1978, and reprinted in 1981. Later paperback editions were issued by Ace Books (April 1987 and March 1991). The first hardcover edition was published by Tor Books in December 2002. The first British edition was issued by Sphere Books in 1978. The book has also been translated into Italian and French. It was later gathered together with Conan the Liberator and Conan and the Spider God into the omnibus collection Sagas of Conan (Tor Books, January 2004).

== Contents ==
- "The Conan Saga" (L. Sprague de Camp)
- "Legions of the Dead" (L. Sprague de Camp and Lin Carter)
- "The People of the Summit" (Björn Nyberg and L. Sprague de Camp)
- "Shadows in the Dark" (L. Sprague de Camp and Lin Carter)
- "The Star of Khorala" (Björn Nyberg and L. Sprague de Camp)
- "The Gem in the Tower" (L. Sprague de Camp and Lin Carter)
- "The Ivory Goddess" (L. Sprague de Camp and Lin Carter)
- "Moon of Blood" (L. Sprague de Camp and Lin Carter)
- "Hyborian Names" (L. Sprague de Camp)

== Plot summary ==
The seven short stories collected as Conan the Swordsman are set at various points of Conan's career, from his youth as a raider in the north to his maturity as a general in the kingdom of Aquilonia. The two associated non-fiction pieces by de Camp are on the Conan saga in general and the derivation of the names used by Howard for constructing the fictional "Hyborian Age" setting of the Conan stories.

Chronologically, the seven stories supplement the tales in the twelve volume Lancer/Ace Conan series, falling into the period covered by Conan through Conan the Warrior.

== Reception ==
Don D'Ammassa, while noting that "Robert E. Howard's Conan is ... the archetypal barbarian fantasy hero," and his "original stories remain the best examples of that form," felt this collection "contains some of the best examples of stories inspired by the unchallenged master" with "several good stories ... most notably "The People of the Summit" and "Shadows in the Dark", as well as a very extensive index to Hyborian names and an essay on the saga, both by De Camp."

Harriet Klausner in MBR Bookwatch called the book "a marvelous short story collection" and "wonderful anthology" of "delightful" stories in which "[e]ach story holds its own with the overall Conan mythos and most add depth to the celebrated character and his world." She singles out "Legions of the Dead" as "[e]specially good" and de Camp's introductory essay as "[e]qually fascinating to readers" for "provid[ing] plenty of insight into Conan and his world as well as Robert E. Howard."

| Preceded by none | Bantam Conan series (publication order) | Succeeded by Conan the Liberator |
