= Sagas of Conan =

2004 fantasy story collection by Tor Books

- Cover of Sagas of Conan
- Author: L. Sprague de Camp, Lin Carter and Björn Nyberg
- Cover artist: Vladimir Nenov
- Language: English
- Series: Conan the Barbarian
- Genre: Sword and sorcery, fantasy
- Publisher: Tor Books
- Publication date: 2004
- Publication place: United States
- Media type: Print (paperback)
- Pages: 448
- ISBN: 0-7653-1054-6
- OCLC: 52943025
- Dewey Decimal: 813/.52 22
- LC Class: PS3507.E2344 A6 2004
- Preceded by: The Further Chronicles of Conan

Sagas of Conan is a 2004 omnibus collection of three previously issued fantasy books written by L. Sprague de Camp, Lin Carter and Björn Nyberg featuring Robert E. Howard's sword and sorcery hero Conan the Barbarian. It was first published in paperback by Tor Books.

== Contents ==
- Conan the Swordsman (L. Sprague de Camp, Lin Carter and Björn Nyberg)
  - "The Conan Saga" (L. Sprague de Camp)
  - "Legions of the Dead" (L. Sprague de Camp and Lin Carter)
  - "The People of the Summit" (Björn Nyberg and L. Sprague de Camp)
  - "Shadows in the Dark" (L. Sprague de Camp and Lin Carter)
  - "The Star of Khorala" (Björn Nyberg and L. Sprague de Camp)
  - "The Gem in the Tower" (L. Sprague de Camp and Lin Carter)
  - "The Ivory Goddess" (L. Sprague de Camp and Lin Carter)
  - "Moon of Blood" (L. Sprague de Camp and Lin Carter)
  - "Hyborian Names" (L. Sprague de Camp)
- Conan the Liberator (L. Sprague de Camp and Lin Carter)
- Conan and the Spider God (L. Sprague de Camp)

== Reception ==
Paula Guran in Cinefantastique writes "Although [ Robert E. Howard's original Conan stories] were a huge influence, the Cimmerian really didn't begin to pervade our culture until the 1970s, due to the comics series and pastiches such as these. L. Sprague de Camp may be disdained for his 'editing' ... of original Howard material ... but his works are enjoyable and acceptable to most sword and sorcery fans, and it's nice to have them back in print. We're not sure why this is subtitled as three novels. This omnibus consists of two novels, 'Conan the Liberator' and 'Conan and the Spider God' (both by de Camp and Carter), and 'Conan the Swordsman' (a collection that also includes work by Bjorn Nyberg)." She gives the book three stars.
