= Black Tears (short story) =

- Short story by L. Sprague de Camp and Lin Carter
- Country: United States
- Language: English
- Genre: Fantasy

Publication
- Published in: Conan the Wanderer
- Publication type: Collection
- Publisher: Lancer Books
- Media type: Print (Paperback)
- Publication date: 1968
- Series: Conan the Barbarian

"Black Tears" is a short story by American writers L. Sprague de Camp and Lin Carter, featuring the fictional sword and sorcery hero Conan the Barbarian created by Robert E. Howard. It was first published by Lancer Books in the paperback collection Conan the Wanderer (1968), which was reprinted several times, first by Lancer and later by Ace Books through 1982. It has since been published by Orbit Books in the omnibus paperback collection The Conan Chronicles 2 (1990).

== Adaptations ==
The story was adapted by Roy Thomas and Ernie Chan in issue #35, cover-dated November 1978, of the Marvel Comics magazine series The Savage Sword of Conan. The Thomas/Buscema tale was later reprinted in the 2008 Dark Horse Comics trade paperback The Savage Sword of Conan Volume 3.

== Notes ==
Preceded by "A Witch Shall be Born"	' Complete Conan Saga (William Galen Gray chronology)	Succeeded by Conan and the Manhunters
