= The Road of Kings =

1979 novel by Karl Edward Wagner

- Cover of the first edition
- Author: Karl Edward Wagner
- Cover artist: Bob Larkin
- Language: English
- Series: Conan the Barbarian
- Genre: Sword and sorcery
- Publisher: Bantam Books
- Publication date: 1979
- Publication place: United States
- Media type: Print (Paperback)
- Pages: 209
- ISBN: 0-553-12026-3
- OCLC: 79406374

The Road of Kings is a fantasy novel by American writer Karl Edward Wagner, featuring Robert E. Howard's sword and sorcery hero Conan the Barbarian. It was first published in paperback by Bantam Books in October 1979. Later paperback editions were issued by Ace Books (1987) and Tor Books 2001. The first trade paperback edition was published by Warner Books in 1989. The first British edition was published by Sphere Books (1986, reissued 1989). Aside from the Bantam and Tor editions all other editions were issued under the variant title Conan: The Road of Kings.

== Plot ==
The novel features Conan during his buccaneering days. After being sentenced to death for a duel in the turbulent kingdom of Zingara, he escapes and joins a group of rebels who plan to overthrow their tyrannical king. When the divided leadership foolishly turns to a wizard for aid, their cause becomes complicated by sorcery rooted in the lost kingdom of Acheron, and the result is not freedom but despotism. Conan helps in overthrowing the new regime. However, when he's given an opportunity to take the throne for himself, Conan uncharacteristically turns down the offer.

== Reception ==
Reviewer Don D'Ammassa calls the book "[q]uite good."

== Adaptation ==
Roy Thomas' Conan: Road of Kings (2010) is not an adaptation of Wagner's novel.

Preceded by The Sword of Skelos	Bantam Conan series (publication order)	Succeeded by Conan the Rebel
Preceded by "Shadows in the Dark"	Complete Conan Saga (William Galen Gray chronology)	Succeeded by Conan the Renegade
