= The Lair of the Ice Worm =

- Short story by L. Sprague de Camp and Lin Carter
- Country: United States
- Language: English
- Genre: Fantasy

Publication
- Published in: Conan of Cimmeria
- Publication type: Collection
- Publisher: Lancer Books
- Media type: Print (Paperback)
- Publication date: 1969
- Series: Conan the Barbarian

"The Lair of the Ice Worm" is a fantasy short story by American writers L. Sprague de Camp and Lin Carter, featuring the fictional sword and sorcery hero Conan the Barbarian created by Robert E. Howard. It was first published by Lancer Books in the paperback collection Conan of Cimmeria (1969), which was reprinted several times, first by Lancer and later by Ace Books through 1993. It has also been published by Sphere Books in the omnibus paperback collection The Conan Chronicles (1989).

== Plot summary ==
Tiring of the icy lands of the Aesir, Conan is traveling through the frozen wastelands north of his home country, and finds himself protecting a girl named Ilga, who is attacked by a tribe of savage subhumans. With night approaching fast, and Conan's horse killed in his battle against the savages, they take refuge in an ice cave, despite Ilga's seemingly irrational fears of something she merely calls "Yakhmar", failing to elaborate. After building a small fire, they have sex and then rest. But in the middle of the night, as Conan sleeps on, two eerie orbs of cold flame appear at the cave's mouth, and a hypnotic piping lures Ilga out of the cave.

When Conan awakens the next morning, he finds the girl missing. Following her trail outside, he encounters strange tracks and finally finds the remains of his horse and of Ilga, with the flesh sucked clean from their bones and the bones themselves surprisingly sheathed in ice. It is then that Conan recalls tribal tales of a creature named Remora, a vampiric worm creature whose body radiates cold and for which Ilga's "Yakhmar" must be another name. Feeling responsible for Ilga's death, he vows to avenge her by slaying the creature.

After collecting the coals of his campfire in his helmet and sticking his battle axe into it, he follows the worm's trail to a glacier cave. As the creature attempts to mesmerize him with its piping, Conan fans the coals in his helmet into white heat and then sends firstly his heated axe, and secondly the helmet with the glowing coals, into the monster's maw. Conan then runs out of the caves, barely making his escape as the Remora's death throes cause the glacier to explode in an avalanche. The story ends with Conan making his way on foot to the southern lands.

== Adaptations ==
"The Lair of the Ice Worm" has been adapted for the comic series Savage Sword of Conan #34, and the GURPS adventure module Conan the Wyrmslayer.

== Notes ==
Preceded by "The Frost-Giant's Daughter"	Complete Conan Saga (William Galen Gray chronology)	Succeeded by Conan the Relentless
