= The Hall of the Dead =

Unfinished Conan story fragment by Robert E. Howard

- Short story by Robert E. Howard and L. Sprague de Camp
- Original title: The Hall of the Dead
- Country: US
- Language: English
- Genre: Fantasy

Publication
- Published in: The Magazine of Fantasy and Science Fiction
- Publication type: Pulp magazine
- Publication date: February 1967
- Series: Conan the Cimmerian

"The Hall of the Dead" is a fantasy short story by American Robert E. Howard, one of his tales featuring the fictional sword and sorcery hero Conan the Cimmerian. A fragment begun in the 1930s but not finished or published in Howard's lifetime, it was completed by L. Sprague de Camp and published in the following works:

- The Magazine of Fantasy and Science Fiction, February 1967
- Conan (Lancer, 1967, later reissued by Ace Books).
- The Conan Chronicles (Sphere Books, 1989)

It has since been published in its original form in the following collections:

- The Conan Chronicles Volume 1: The People of the Black Circle (Gollancz, 2000)
- Conan of Cimmeria: Volume One (1932–1933) (Del Rey, 2003).

== Plot summary ==
=== Howard's unfinished version ===
Nestor, a mercenary from Gunderland, is leading a squad of Zamorian soldiers in pursuit of the thief Conan. In a mountain gorge, Nestor trips over a rawhide tripwire set in the high grass of a grove by Conan. The trap activates an avalanche which kills all of Nestor's men, but only lightly injures Nestor himself. Enraged, Nestor pursues Conan into the ruins of an ancient city and a battle between the two ensues. A hit from the barbarian's sword renders Nestor temporary senseless and Conan, thinking Nestor is dead, continues deeper into the ruins. As Nestor is recovering, Conan stumbles upon some unspecified monstrosity that he defeats by first hurling rocks upon it from an elevation and then finishing it off with his sword. Nestor eventually catches up with Conan outside a great palace in the middle of the city. Conan convinces Nestor to abandon his mission in favor of joining him in raiding the palace for treasure. Descending into the palace, the duo eventually reaches a treasure vault adorned with the bodies of long-dead warriors. After gathering up some loot of coins and jewels, the two throw dice for a jade serpent idol. Conan eventually wins but, as he lifts up the idol, the dead warriors awaken. The two fight their way out of the palace and are eventually followed by only a single large warrior. As the three of them emerge to the sunlight outside, the undead creature crumbles to dust. The two make for their escape, but an earthquake hits the ruins and separates Conan from Nestor.

Later, Conan is in a tavern with a young woman he rescued. Conan empties his bag of jewels onto their table, but to his amazement they too, like the undead warrior, had turned to dust. The girl lifts up the leather sack with the snake idol in it for Conan to examine, but soon drops it with a scream as she feels something moving inside it. At this very moment, a magistrate enters the tavern with a group of soldiers and has Conan driven up against a wall. It turns out that Nestor, having gotten drunk on the money of his which never turned to dust, had told of his exploits with Conan in their presence and just barely escaped arrest. The magistrate decides to confiscate Conan's leather bag. However, as he places his hand into it, he immediately retracts it with a shriek revealing a live serpent biting fast onto his finger. The resulting turmoil allows Conan and the girl to escape.

=== L. S. de Camp's version ===
Conan is exploring the haunted ruins of the ancient city of Larsha in the country of Zamora, led there by rumors of a hidden treasure. Behind him, in pursuit, is an army of Zamorian soldiers sent to capture Conan for crimes of theft against rich merchants and nobles. Leading them is a captain from Gunderland named Nestor. Suddenly, as Nestor turns his head to berate the men for their constant chatter, he fails to notice a rawhide tripwire left earlier by Conan. Nestor falls sprawling in the grass and sets off Conan's trap as a large pile of rocks wipe out his men, leaving him battered and bruised but alive.

Enraged at the loss of his men and fearing the consequences of returning without his prisoner, Nestor decides to pursue Conan alone. He finally confronts him just outside the walls of Larsha, as the young barbarian is searching for a way inside. The two engage in fierce swordplay, until Conan strikes Nestor in the head. The sword penetrates Nestor's helmet and he collapses to the ground, unconscious.

Conan then makes his way into the deserted city and begins to thread the winding streets, recalling the tales he had heard concerning a horrible fate which befell trespassers. Soon, he confronts a monster in the form of a giant slug, fifty feet long with the ability to spit a corrosive acid with deadly accuracy. The slug chases Conan throughout the city, until he climbs up the roof of a decaying temple and manages to knock over some gargoyle statuary, one after the other, crushing the monster to death.

After climbing back down, while making sure the slug is dead, he hears a familiar voice and turns to see Nestor confronting him again, this time with a bandaged head wound. Conan's blow had only succeeded in injuring him. However, just as they are about to resume combat, the two decide on a mutual agreement. The two warriors will search for the treasure as allies and divide whatever they find among themselves.

They enter the royal palace of Larsha, intricately carved from a single rock formation of black basalt, and where the treasure is supposed to lie hidden. They light torches to find their way through various passages and eventually come across a vault. Gaining entry, they discover inside a glittering hoard of treasure– gold, silver, and jewels in a vast pile of splendour. However, guarding this ancient wealth are the mummified corpses of seven giant warriors seated in chairs, which promptly come to life and attack the pair of adventurers as they are gathering the treasure.

After a desperate fight, Conan and Nestor escape from the vault with the mummies in pursuit. As they follow them out into the sunlight, the undead creatures immediately turn to dust, the necromantic spell broken by mere contact. Suddenly, the earth beneath their feet begins to tremble in a great earthquake as walls and columns fall before them. Conan escapes the final destruction of Larsha, but Nestor is nowhere to be found. Calling his name and getting no response, Conan assumes the worst and travels into the city of Shadizar with his bag of jewels.

That night in Shadizar, Conan swaggers into his favorite tavern and makes his way to a table where his sweetheart of the moment sits drinking alone and begins boasting of his adventure. He empties the contents of his treasure bag, seven priceless green jewels worth enough to buy an entire kingdom, onto the table and, like the seven undead guardians, they too crumble into worthless powder much to his chagrin. A magistrate then enters the tavern, followed by a squad of night watch, with the intent to arrest Conan on his original charges of theft and the slaying of Nestor's men. As it turned out, Nestor survived the earthquake at Larsha. He was discovered by the authorities drunk and, like Conan, boasting of his amazing feat. When they tried to apprehend Nestor, he fled into the nearby jungle. However, Nestor lost his loot to the police who made a dash to claim it for themselves. The magistrate who confronted Conan then reaches inside a leather bag on the table where Conan's last remaining prize was concealed, a statuette in the form of a jade green serpent. As the magistrate thrust his hand inside, the statuette comes to life and bites into his flesh. In the resulting panic and confusion, Conan made good his own escape.

On the road outside Shadizar, Conan and Nestor meet at a prearranged spot while sharing news of one another's misadventures. After accepting their fates with grim humor, the two amicably decide on parting ways.

== Adaptation ==
The Howard fragment was adapted by Roy Thomas and Barry Smith in Marvel Comics' Conan the Barbarian #8 as "The Keepers of the Crypt" in 1971, and by Mike Mignola and Cary Nord in Dark Horse Comics' Conan #29-31. The latter follows minor plot threads exclusive to that continuity.

Preceded by "Drums of Tombalku"	Original Howard Canon (publication order)	Succeeded by "The Vale of Lost Women"
Preceded by "The Tower of the Elephant"	Original Howard Canon (Dale Rippke chronology)	Succeeded by "Rogues in the House"
Preceded by Conan the Invincible	Complete Conan Saga (William Galen Gray chronology)	Succeeded by Conan the Fearless
