= Conan and the Sorcerer =

1978 novel by Andrew J. Offutt

- Cover
- Author: Andrew J. Offutt
- Illustrator: Esteban Maroto
- Cover artist: Sanjulián
- Language: English
- Series: Conan the Barbarian
- Genre: Sword and sorcery
- Publisher: Sunridge Press
- Publication date: 1978
- Publication place: United States

Conan and the Sorcerer is a fantasy novel written by Andrew J. Offutt and illustrated by Esteban Maroto. Featuring Robert E. Howard's sword and sorcery hero Conan the Barbarian, it is the first in a trilogy continuing with Conan the Mercenary and concluding with The Sword of Skelos. It was first published in paperback by Sunridge Press in October 1978, and reprinted in May 1979, 1982, and March 1984 by Ace Books.

== Plot summary ==
Attempting to steal from a wizard named Hissar Zul, the young Conan finds the tables turned when his intended victim steals his soul and imprisons it inside a mirror. The Wizard promises to restore Conan's soul if he retrieves for Zul a magical artifact previously stolen from him. With little recourses, the barbarian tracks down Zul's artifact along with the woman who stole it, recovering it after a number of adventures. Unfortunately, he finds Zul disinclined to honor his end of the bargain. After killing the wizard, Conan's new goal is to find another means of reuniting both his body and soul. His quest continues in Conan the Mercenary.

== Reception ==
Critic Don D'Ammassa's review of the novel confines itself to a plot description, not addressing the book's merits aside from a mention of its "cliff hanger ending." He does, however, rate it above the same author's The Sword of Skelos, which he elsewhere calls "[t]he weakest of Offutt's three [Conan] pastiches."

== Adaptations ==
The story was adapted by Roy Thomas and John Buscema in issues #53-55, cover-dated June–August 1980, of the Marvel Comics magazine series The Savage Sword of Conan. The Thomas/Buscema tale was later reprinted in the 2009 Dark Horse Comics trade paperback The Savage Sword of Conan Volume 5.

Isparana, created by Offutt for this novel, also appeared in the miniseries Conan the Barbarian: Flame and the Fiend (August–October 2000) by Roy Thomas, and Geof Isherwood.

== Notes ==
Preceded by none	Ace Maroto Conan series (publication order)	Succeeded by The Treasure of Tranicos
Preceded by "The Tower of the Elephant"	Complete Conan Saga (William Galen Gray chronology)	Succeeded by Conan the Mercenary
