= The Sword of Skelos =

1979 novel by Andrew J. Offutt

- Cover of the first edition
- Author: Andrew J. Offutt
- Cover artist: Bob Larkin
- Language: English
- Series: Conan the Barbarian
- Genre: Sword and sorcery
- Publisher: Bantam Books
- Publication date: 1979
- Publication place: United States
- Media type: Print (Paperback)
- Pages: 246
- ISBN: 0-553-12970-8

The Sword of Skelos is a fantasy novel by American writer Andrew J. Offutt, featuring Robert E. Howard's sword and sorcery hero Conan the Barbarian, the third and final volume in a trilogy beginning with Conan and the Sorcerer and continuing with Conan the Mercenary (which was actually published after The Sword of Skelos, though relating events prior to it). It was first published in paperback in May 1979 by Bantam Books, and reprinted in August 1981. Later editions were issued by Ace Books (September 1987, reprinted May 1991) and Tor Books (February 2002). The first British edition was published by Sphere Books in 1989.

== Plot summary ==
In Shadizar, Conan encounters Khassek, an agent for the Shah of Iranistan, whose master wishes to obtain the Eye of Erlik, now in the barbarian's possession. Conan accompanies him on Kassek's excursion towards Iranistan. However, their journey is interrupted by his rival Isparana, on the run with Sarid, a renegade soldier from Turan. Both Khassek and Sarid are killed in their confrontation with a giant scorpion. Following Khassek's death, Conan abandons his mission, joins forces with Isparana, and travels instead for Zamboula. They're attacked by a band of raiders, who in turn are attacked by another tribe of raiders, the Shanki, who, victorious, escort the couple back to their oasis. At their village, Akhimen Khan, leader of the Shanki, welcomes the two and sends them off to Zamboula.

There is trouble in Zamboula, however. The ruler, Akter Khan, has been corrupted by the power of his sorcerer, Zafra, who has enchanted two swords with magic, one of which is in the possession of the Khan himself. Secretly, Zafra is conspiring against him with the Khan's mistress Chia. Both the Khan and Zafra desire the Eye of Erlik. Magically aware of its approach, Zafra has his soldiers intercept Conan and Isparana near a canyon. The soldiers escort them towards the city, where they present the artifact to Akter Khan. However, Zafra poisons the khan's mind against them and persuades his master to imprison rather than reward both travelers. Isparana is taken away, but Conan is absent. Learning of the khan's ill-will, he joins forces with the rebel Balad and the tribesman Hajimen, son of his Shanki host, both of whom have grievances against the ruler.

Conan is captured attempting to rescue Isparana, and Zafra plans on dispatching him with his magic sword, which fights on its own accord. Conan staves off the flying sword long enough for it turns on its own master, as its enchantment requires it be slaked with blood. With the sorcerer out of the picture, the barbarian goes on to locate and free Isparana. The two confront the khan, who attempts to slay them with his own magic sword only to find it ineffective, as Zafra had tricked him, binding it to his will alone. Meanwhile, the Zamboulan guards have been overcome by the forces of Hajimen and Balad, the latter of whom slays Ahkter Khan and claims the throne for his own.

Balad, proving no better than his predecessor, turns against Conan, only to fall victim to the mortally wounded Zafra, who, crawling into the room, commands the late khan's sword to attack. As Balad is the closest person to the weapon, it dispatches him; Conan beheads Zafra before the sorcerer can issue a second command to the sword. The rulership of Zamboula now passes to Akter Khan's son Jungir, to whom Isparana promptly attaches herself. Conan leaves the city.

== Reception ==
Michael Rogers in Library Journal wrote "[d]iehards aren't drawn to these books for the great plots, so this one ... is worth buying, especially at this price."

Don D'Ammassa calls the novel "The weakest of Offutt's three pastiches," writing "Conan manages to survive two attempts to use the swords to kill him, one by an absurd trick that had me shaking my head, the other through a hidden rule of magic that we didn't know about."

== Adaptations ==
The story was adapted by Roy Thomas and John Buscema in issues #56-58, cover-dated September–November 1980, of the Marvel Comics magazine series The Savage Sword of Conan. The Thomas/Buscema tale was later reprinted in the 2009 Dark Horse Comics trade paperback The Savage Sword of Conan Volume 5.

Preceded by Conan the Liberator	Bantam Conan series (publication order)	Succeeded by The Road of Kings
Preceded by Conan the Mercenary	Complete Conan Saga (William Galen Gray chronology)	Succeeded by Conan the Outcast
