= Conan the Champion =

Book by John Maddox Roberts

- Cover of first edition
- Author: John Maddox Roberts
- Cover artist: Ken Kelly
- Language: English
- Series: Conan the Barbarian
- Genre: Sword and sorcery
- Publisher: Tor Books
- Publication date: 1987
- Publication place: United States
- Media type: Print (paperback)
- Pages: 280
- ISBN: 0-8125-4260-6

Conan the Champion is a fantasy novel by American writer John Maddox Roberts, featuring Robert E. Howard's sword and sorcery hero Conan the Barbarian. It was first published in paperback by Tor Books in April 1987 and reprinted in January 1989. The first British edition was published in paperback by Sphere Books, also in January 1989.

== Plot ==
Shipwrecked on the northern shore of the Vilayet Sea, Conan finds himself stranded for the winter in the midst of two rival kingdoms. Joining the force of one of the factions, he becomes a champion of Queen Alcuina in her opposition against the competing rulership of Odoac and Totila. As a wild card in their local struggle, all parties seek to use him to tip the balance in their own favor. Stranded in a mysterious otherworld, Conan and Alcuina must find a way to escape before everything can be resolved.

== Reception ==
Don D'Ammassa, writing of Roberts' Conan novels, noted that "[a]lthough Roberts did not recreate Howard's character exactly, making him more intellectual and less inclined to solve every problem by hitting it with a sword, his evocation of the barbaric setting is superior to that of most of the other writers contributing to the series." Of this novel he writes "[t]he giant scorpion was nice but otherwise this was not up to Roberts' usual standards."

Writing of some other Tor Conan novels, reviewer Ryan Harvey called Roberts "the most consistently successful of its stable of authors," and "the most consistently entertaining" of them, showing "deft ability with storytelling and action scenes, and a thankful tendency not to overplay his hand and try to ape Robert E. Howard's style."

Preceded by Conan the Raider	Tor Conan series (publication order)	Succeeded by Conan the Defiant
Preceded by Conan, Scourge of the Bloody Coast	Complete Conan Saga (William Galen Gray chronology)	Succeeded by "The Road of the Eagles"
