= The Return of Conan =

Fantasy novel by Björn Nyberg and L. Sprague de Camp

- Cover of the first edition
- Authors: Björn Nyberg and L. Sprague de Camp
- Cover artist: Wallace Wood
- Language: English
- Series: Conan the Barbarian
- Genre: Sword and sorcery
- Publisher: Gnome Press
- Publication date: 1957
- Publication place: United States
- Media type: Print (hardback)
- Pages: 191

The Return of Conan is a 1957 fantasy novel written by Björn Nyberg and L. Sprague de Camp, featuring Robert E. Howard's sword and sorcery hero Conan the Barbarian. It was first published in hardcover by Gnome Press and in paperback by Lancer Books as part of the collection Conan the Avenger in 1968; in this form it has been reprinted a number of times since by various publishers. It has also been translated into Japanese, German and Spanish.

== Plot summary ==
In the kingdom of Aquilonia, a year of peace for King Conan and his new queen Zenobia is broken when the latter is abducted by a demon. Conan learns from the wizard, Pelias of Koth, that an eastern sorcerer, Yah Chieng of Khitai, is responsible, and begins a quest to recover her without realizing that the fate of the world, as well as Aquilonia, rests on the outcome of the contest.

Chronologically, The Return of Conan falls between Howard's novel The Hour of the Dragon (also known as Conan the Conqueror), and the four short stories collected as Conan of Aquilonia.

In both the hardcover Gnome Press edition and the paperback Lancer/Ace edition of the Conan stories, The Return of Conan follows Robert E. Howard's novel Conan the Conqueror; it is the final volume chronologically in the Gnome edition (though one additional volume, Tales of Conan, contains stories issued out of sequence), while in the Lancer/Ace edition it is followed by the short stories collected as Conan of Aquilonia.

== Reception ==
Everett F. Bleiler reported that the novel was "not very good."

Critic Don D'Ammassa writes that there are "[s]ome clumsy plot devices in this one but it does capture most of the flavor of Howard's work."

== Background and Interpretations ==
The Return of Conan was only the second Conan novel ever written, the first being Howard's The Hour of the Dragon. Nyberg, a Swedish fan of Howard's Conan tales, was inspired enough by them to pen the story in a language not even his own. De Camp's contribution was largely to smooth off the rough edges of the resulting text.

Ward Brown noted that "Under a commonly-held theory, Conan manifested Howard's idealized self-image, the larger-than-life hero he would have liked to be in an impossibly perfect world. Reading The Return of Conan one gets the clear impression that Nyberg added himself, his own idealized self-image, placing himself at Conan's side as Rolf - the Scandinavian Viking-type comrade-in-arms, who suddenly appears when the hero stands at bay against impossible odds in the palace of the King of Turan."

The present book is also unique among Conan books - both the original Howard Canon and the various later additions - in featuring a direct intervention by the Cimmerian god Crom. While habitually using Crom's name as an expletive, Conan rarely prays or calls upon that god for help. As repeatedly stated by Conan, Crom is a reclusive god, who gives his Cimmerians the strength to fight and for the rest expects them to take care of themselves - and Conan feels fine with that. Crom's reason for making a big exception and directly intervening to save Conan in this case is not explicated.

Preceded by Conan the Conqueror	Gnome Conan series (chronological order)	Succeeded by Tales of Conan
Preceded by The Hour of the Dragon	Complete Conan Saga (William Galen Gray chronology)	Succeeded by Conan the Great
