= Conan the Valiant =

Novel by Roland J. Green

- Cover
- Author: Roland Green
- Cover artist: Ken Kelly
- Language: English
- Series: Conan the Barbarian
- Genre: Sword and sorcery
- Publisher: Tor Books
- Publication date: 1988
- Publication place: United States
- Media type: Print (Paperback)
- Pages: 280
- ISBN: 0-812-50082-2

Conan the Valiant is a fantasy novel by American writer Roland Green, featuring Robert E. Howard's sword and sorcery hero Conan the Barbarian. It was first published in trade paperback by Tor Books in October 1988; a regular paperback edition followed from the same publisher in August 1989, and was reprinted in July 2000.

== Plot ==
Conan the Valiant begins in Turan, where a 22-year-old Conan is recovering from his victory over the Cult of Doom (found in Robert Jordan's Conan the Unconquered). Conan finds himself involved in court intrigue and joins forces with a sword maiden, Raihna, and her employer, a sorcerer named Illyana, in their efforts against the growing menace of an evil wizard named Eremius. Using one of the Jewels of Kurag — the other is held by Illyana — Eremius has command over his growing army of the Transformed, former humans who were mutated into reptilian demons, and is looking to conquer a large region of Turan. The combination of local villagers, Conan's sword, and Illyana's magic destroy Eremius as well as the twin Jewels.

== Reception ==
Writing of this novel, Don D'Ammassa noted that "Green spends a lot more time on background detail than did some of Conan's chroniclers."

Preceded by Conan the Warlord	Tor Conan series (publication order)	Succeeded by Conan the Hero
Preceded by "The Curse of the Monolith"	Complete Conan Saga (William Galen Gray chronology)	Succeeded by Conan and the Spider God
