= Conan and the Gods of the Mountain =

Novel by Roland J. Green

- Cover
- Author: Roland Green
- Cover artist: Ken Kelly
- Language: English
- Series: Conan the Barbarian
- Genre: Sword and sorcery
- Publisher: Tor Books
- Publication date: 1993
- Publication place: United States
- Media type: Print (Paperback)
- Pages: 276
- ISBN: 0-812-51414-9

Conan and the Gods of the Mountain is a fantasy novel by American writer Roland Green, featuring Robert E. Howard's sword and sorcery hero Conan the Barbarian. It was first published in paperback by Tor Books in May 1993 and reprinted in November 1998.

== Plot ==
The novel picks up where Robert E. Howard's "Red Nails" leaves off, with Conan and his current flame, the she-pirate Valeria of the Red Brotherhood, newly escaped from the self-destruction of the lost city of Xuchotl. Treking through the jungles of Kush in an attempt to reach the coast, they become involved in a three-sided conflict between the Kwanyi tribe, divided among feuding clans, the Ichiribu, and the God-Men of Thunder Mountain, who can read the future and command the soul-eating Living Wind. Much of the action occurs underground, culminating in a battle between Conan and the giant Golden Serpent. The Living Wind, faced at the end of the story, proves to be an anticlimactic threat, summarily dealt with by a local shaman.

== Reception ==
Critic Don D'Ammassa wrote "This was a pretty good jungle adventure but it does not feel much like a Conan story, and indeed he is not on stage for a good proportion of it."

== Adaptations ==
The story was adapted by Roy Thomas and Rafael Kayanan in issues #211-213, 215 and 217, cover-dated July–September 1993, November 1993, and January 1994, of the Marvel Comics magazine series The Savage Sword of Conan. The Thomas/Kayanan tale was later reprinted in the 2016 Dark Horse Comics trade paperback The Savage Sword of Conan Volume 21.

Preceded by Conan of the Red Brotherhood	Tor Conan series (publication order)	Succeeded by Conan and the Treasure of Python
Preceded by "Red Nails"	Complete Conan Saga (William Galen Gray chronology)	Succeeded by "Jewels of Gwahlur"
