= Conan the Fearless =

Book by Steve Perry

- Cover of first edition
- Author: Steve Perry
- Cover artist: Kirk Reinert
- Language: English
- Series: Conan the Barbarian
- Genre: Sword and sorcery
- Publisher: Tor Books
- Publication date: 1986
- Publication place: United States
- Media type: Print (Paperback)
- Pages: 275
- ISBN: 0-8125-4248-7

Conan the Fearless is a fantasy novel by American writer Steve Perry, featuring Robert E. Howard's sword and sorcery hero Conan the Barbarian. It was first published in trade paperback by Tor Books in February 1986; a regular paperback edition followed from the same publisher in January 1987, and was reprinted at least once. The first British edition was published in paperback by Sphere Books in January 1988.

The book also includes "Conan the Indestructible", L. Sprague de Camp's chronological essay on Conan's career.

== Plot ==
Conan finds himself in the Corinthian city of Mornstadinos, after he enlists as a bodyguard defending a magician and Eldia, a girl who has control over fire elementals, against an evil mage named Sovartus. Sovartus is collecting such elemental whisperers and already has the other three. He wants Eldia to complete his set. This brings Conan into conflict with a host of other threats as well, including a demon employed by Sovartus and the witch Djuvula, who happens to be the demon's half-sister, the rich senator Lemparius, who's actually a were-panther, an avaricious thief named Loganaro, and various monsters. Plots and counter-plots build up to a climax at Sovartus' stronghold.

== Reception ==
Ryan Harvey rates Conan the Fearless above Conan the Free Lance, one of Perry's later Conan novels, in a review of that book. Harvey assesses the author's Conan corpus in general as "goofy," noting that he "has a reputation among Conan fandom for overkill and general silliness."

Critic Don D'Ammassa opined "This one is pretty good".

Preceded by Conan the Valorous	Tor Conan series (publication order)	Succeeded by Conan the Renegade
Preceded by "The Hall of the Dead"	Complete Conan Saga (William Galen Gray chronology)	Succeeded by "The God in the Bowl"
