= Conan and the Treasure of Python =

Book by John Maddox Roberts

- Cover of first edition
- Author: John Maddox Roberts
- Cover artist: Ken Kelly
- Language: English
- Series: Conan the Barbarian
- Genre: Sword and sorcery
- Publisher: Tor Books
- Publication date: 1993
- Publication place: United States
- Media type: Print (paperback)
- Pages: 280
- ISBN: 0-8125-1415-7

Conan and the Treasure of Python is a fantasy novel by American writer John Maddox Roberts, featuring Robert E. Howard's sword and sorcery hero Conan the Barbarian. It was first published in trade paperback by Tor Books in November 1993; a regular paperback edition followed from the same publisher in August 1994.

== Plot ==
In Asgalun, Conan is hired to lead a scouting party into Kush by a man whose brother has vanished while in search of a legendary treasure. Conan agrees with the proposal, though their project is almost derailed from the beginning in an attack by corsairs. In Kush, the expedition is joined by Goma, a mysterious native who serves as their guide. Various perils in their quest for the fabled treasure ensue, including a journey across an arid desert. Finally, Conan's party discover a secret kingdom and are imprisoned within the dungeon of an evil warlord. Soon, their guide reveals himself as the kingdom's rightful monarch. Goma explains how he was overthrown by a tyrant with the aid of a witch doctor. A battle must be won and a fearsome lake monster faced before all can be resolved.

== Reception ==
Don D'Ammassa, writing of Roberts' Conan novels, noted that "[a]lthough Roberts did not recreate Howard's character exactly, making him more intellectual and less inclined to solve every problem by hitting it with a sword, his evocation of the barbaric setting is superior to that of most of the other writers contributing to the series." This novel, he writes, "is a rewrite of Haggard's King Solomon's Mines with the characters shuffled around a bit but with essentially the same plot. ... It's an effective adaptation of a classic story although Conan seems considerably more laid back than usual – not surprising since he's Allan Quatermain."

Reviewer Ryan Harvey considered the book "one of the most interesting of the Tor novels," and the writer "the most consistently successful of its stable of authors," while also noting that "this novel is literally King Solomon's Mines ... Roberts copies the exact plot of the classic H. Rider Haggard 1885 adventure novel and recasts it as a Conan story, with the legendary barbarian starring in the Allan Quatermain role."

Preceded by Conan and the Gods of the Mountain	Tor Conan series (publication order)	Succeeded by Conan the Hunter
Preceded by "The Ivory Goddess"	Complete Conan Saga (William Galen Gray chronology)	Succeeded by Conan, Lord of the Black River
