= The Hand of Nergal =

Unfinished Conan story fragment by Robert E. Howard

- Short story by Robert E. Howard/Lin Carter
- Original title: The Hand of Nergal
- Country: US
- Language: English
- Genre: Fantasy

Publication
- Published in: Conan
- Publication type: Paperback
- Publisher: Lancer Books
- Publication date: 1967
- Series: Conan the Cimmerian

"The Hand of Nergal" is one of the original short stories by American author Robert E. Howard starring the sword and sorcery hero Conan the Cimmerian, an untitled fragment begun in the 1930s but not finished or published in Howard's lifetime. It was completed and titled by Lin Carter and in this form was published in the following collections:

- Conan (Lancer, 1967, later reissued by Ace Books).
- The Conan Chronicles (Sphere Books, 1989)
- Beyond the Gates of Dream (Belmont Books, 1969), a collection of short stories by Lin Carter and collaborators.

It has since been published in its original form in:

- The Conan Chronicles Volume 1: The People of the Black Circle (Gollancz, 2000)
- Conan of Cimmeria: Volume One (1932–1933) (Del Rey, 2003).

== Plot summary ==
Conan is a mercenary, serving in the empire of Turan, and fighting in a pitched battle against the forces of a rebellious satrap named Munthassem Khan. As the two sides are locked in furious combat, Conan looks up and sees a swarm of winged monsters with hellish green eyes, resembling enormous bats, descend from the sky before appearing on the battlefield. Unknown to Conan, Munthassem Khan had summoned these supernatural creatures using a magical artifact known as the Hand of Nergal. The Turanians are frightened and begin retreating from the battlefield. Soon, Conan is left to face one of the shadow bats alone. As he begins to fall victim to an unearthly cold emanating from the monster, his hand reaches for a mysterious golden talisman in his pouch that he had discovered earlier. As he touches it, a surge of warmth flows through him, banishing the shadow bat; overcome with exhaustion, Conan loses consciousness.

An hour later, Conan awakens from his exhaustion, finding himself alone on the battlefield amid the dead bodies and wreckage of war. Soon, Conan discovers two survivors, the horse belonging to his former general, now dead, and a young Brythunian girl named Hildico. Hildico had been sent by her master, a wise sorcerer named Atalis, in the nearby city of Yaralet, ruled by Munthassem Khan. Convincing him to come with her to visit the sorcerer, Conan convenes with Atalis who explains that his help is needed to end both Munthassem Khan's tyrannical reign of terror over the citizens of Yaralet and his rebellion against King Yildiz of Turania.

According to the tale told by Atalis, Munthassem Khan was once a kind and merciful ruler until he came into possession of the Hand of Nergal, an object of evil power in the form of an ivory sceptre with a clawed demon hand at one end grasping a crystal. Inscribed on the sceptre is a series of strange glyphs and runes. It fell to earth from the stars in ancient times and, as it changed hands through the ages, it granted whoever claimed it the promise of ultimate power as well as the curse of eventual destruction. The only way to counter the Hand's malevolent force is with a talisman known as the Heart of Tammuz, a golden amber stone shaped like a heart and warm to the touch, the same talisman which Conan had found and used in overcoming the shadow bats.

Conan eventually confronts Munthassem Khan in his throne room, but finds himself losing to the power of the Hand until Hildico comes to his rescue, grabs the Heart of Tammuz, and hurls it at Munthassem Khan. Conan's amulet strikes Khan in the forehead and renders him unconscious. The forces inside both artifacts are then unleashed and wage a cosmic struggle against each other until both finally come together with a great shattering thunder as of two worlds colliding. In the aftermath, both the Heart and Hand have vanished. Soon, nothing is left of Munthassem Khan except for a pile of ashes. The curse is broken and Yaralet is free from Khan's tyranny.

== Adaptations ==
- Conan the Barbarian #30 (Marvel Comics, Sept 1973) by writer/editor Roy Thomas and artists John Buscema and Ernie Chan.
- Conan #47 - 50 (Dark Horse Comics) by Tim Truman and Tomas Giorello.

== See also ==
- Nergal
- Tammuz (deity)
- Amarna letter EA 35

Preceded by "Wolves Beyond the Border"	Original Howard Canon (publication order)	Succeeded by "The Snout in the Dark"
Preceded by "Rogues in the House"	Original Howard Canon (Dale Rippke chronology)	Succeeded by "Shadows in the Moonlight"
Preceded by Conan the Unconquered	Complete Conan Saga (William Galen Gray chronology)	Succeeded by "The City of Skulls"
