= Conan the Valorous =

Book by John Maddox Roberts

- Cover of first edition
- Author: John Maddox Roberts
- Cover artist: Kirk Reinert
- Language: English
- Series: Conan the Barbarian
- Genre: Sword and sorcery
- Publisher: Tor Books
- Publication date: 1985
- Publication place: United States
- Media type: Print (paperback)
- Pages: 280
- ISBN: 0-8125-4244-4

Conan the Valorous is a fantasy novel by American writer John Maddox Roberts, featuring Robert E. Howard's sword and sorcery hero Conan the Barbarian. It was first published in trade paperback by Tor Books in September 1985; a regular paperback edition followed from the same publisher in September 1986, and was reprinted in January 1992. The first British edition was published in paperback by Sphere Books in September 1987.

The book also includes "Conan the Indestructible", L. Sprague de Camp's chronological essay on Conan's career.

== Plot ==
Hathor-Ka, a Stygian sorceress, tricks Conan into stealing certain relics from Ben Morgh, a sacred mountain in Cimmeria. His expedition takes him across Koth, Nemedia, and the Border Kingdoms where Conan is diverted by his rescue of a chieftainess. Meanwhile, Jaganath (a sorcerer from Vendhya) is also on a journey into the Cimmerian Wilderness. In Cimmeria, the various clans are uniting against the Vanir and their allies, a tribe of lizard folk. The two armies are traveling towards Ben Morgh and proceed with a final battle. As the conflict rages on, Conan and a wizard from Khitai wage a more crucial battle inside Crom's Cave beneath the mountain with the unexpected aid of Jaganath, Hathor-Ka, and her patron, Thoth-Amon. Ultimately, Cimmeria is delivered from outside sorcery and Conan joins a raiding party of Aesir in their journey towards Hyberborea.

== Reception ==
Don D'Ammassa, writing of Roberts' Conan novels, noted that "[a]lthough Roberts did not recreate Howard's character exactly, making him more intellectual and less inclined to solve every problem by hitting it with a sword, his evocation of the barbaric setting is superior to that of most of the other writers contributing to the series." He calls this novel, "the author's first Conan pastiche, one of the better entries in the series, and the closest view we see of the land [of] Cimmeria except for the Conan novel by Harry Turtledove."

Writing of some other Tor Conan novels, reviewer Ryan Harvey called Roberts "the most consistently successful of its stable of authors," and "the most consistently entertaining" of them, showing "deft ability with storytelling and action scenes, and a thankful tendency not to overplay his hand and try to ape Robert E. Howard's style."

Preceded by Conan the Victorious	Tor Conan series (publication order)	Succeeded by Conan the Fearless
Preceded by "The Blood-Stained God"	Complete Conan Saga (William Galen Gray chronology)	Succeeded by "The Frost-Giant's Daughter"
