= Conan the Rebel =

Novel by Poul Anderson

- Cover of first edition
- Author: Poul Anderson
- Illustrator: Tim Kirk
- Cover artist: Bob Larkin
- Language: English
- Series: Conan the Barbarian
- Genre: Sword and sorcery
- Publisher: Bantam Books
- Publication date: 1980
- Publication place: United States
- Media type: Print (Paperback)
- Pages: 208
- ISBN: 0-553-13831-6

Conan the Rebel is a fantasy novel by American writer Poul Anderson, featuring Robert E. Howard's sword and sorcery hero Conan the Barbarian. It was first published in paperback by Bantam Books in July 1980. It was reprinted once by Bantam (1981) and twice by Ace Books (1988, 1991). The first hardcover edition was published by Tor Books in 2001; a trade paperback followed from the same publisher in 2003. The first British edition was published by Sphere Books in 1988.

== Plot summary ==
Conan the Rebel details the involvement of Conan in a rebellion in the kingdom of Stygia, on account of his lover, the pirate queen Bêlit. Having taken upon himself the task of rescuing Bêlit's brother from captivity, Conan finds himself enmeshed in the affairs of the rebel province of Taia, where he conveniently fits into their legend of a savior from the north. Meanwhile, the priests of Stygia, prompted by an oracle of their god Set branding Conan a threat, want to capture Conan, and the king, to whom the unrest is a distraction from his scheme to invade Ophir, also has it in for him.

Chronologically, the story occurs between chapters 1 and 2 of the Robert E. Howard Conan story "Queen of the Black Coast". Bêlit, aside from getting the action going, is almost entirely absent from the ensuing adventure.

== Reception ==
Reviewer Don D'Ammassa noted "There are some very contrived plot devices but overall this was an entertaining adventure." Publishers Weekly felt that it didn't live up to Howard's creation but that fans would enjoy it.

Preceded by The Road of Kings	Bantam Conan series (publication order)	Succeeded by Conan and the Spider God
Preceded by Queen of the Black Coast (Part 1)	Complete Conan Saga (William Galen Gray chronology)	Succeeded by Queen of the Black Coast (Part 2)
