= Conan the Defiant =

Book by Steve Perry

- Cover of first edition
- Author: Steve Perry
- Language: English
- Series: Conan the Barbarian
- Genre: Sword and sorcery
- Publisher: Tor Books
- Publication date: 1987
- Publication place: United States
- Media type: Print (Paperback)
- Pages: 245
- ISBN: 0-8125-4264-9

Conan the Defiant is a fantasy novel by American writer Steve Perry, featuring Robert E. Howard's sword and sorcery hero Conan the Barbarian. It was first published in trade paperback by Tor Books in October 1987, with a regular paperback edition issued simultaneously by the same publisher, and was reprinted in August 1988. A British edition was published in paperback by Orbit Books in January 1990.

== Plot ==
Conan falls in with Cengh, a priest of the Suddah Oblates, who is conveying a jewel known as the Source of Light back to his temple. Unfortunately, his talisman is coveted by a necromancer, Neg the Malefic, who plans on raising an army of undead warriors with the jewel's magic. When an agent of Neg murders Cengh and steals the jewel, Conan seeks vengeance for his friend. Joining forces with a warrior woman, Elashi, and a beautiful zombie, Tuanne, Conan tracks the murderer back to his master. They overcome numerous menaces on the journey towards Neg's stronghold, including the Men With No Eyes, henchmen of the One With No Name, and a swarm of spiders. Finally, Conan faces and kills Neg himself in a great battle.

== Chronology ==
Internal evidence indicates that Perry's later Conan work Conan the Indomitable directly follows this novel, though in the comprehensive Conan chronology of William Galen Gray, Sean A. Moore's Conan the Hunter is placed between the two books.

== Reception ==
Writing on one of Perry's other novels, reviewer Ryan Harvey assessed the author's Conan corpus as "goofy," noting that he "has a reputation among Conan fandom for overkill and general silliness." Ryan does rate this book above Perry's later novel Conan the Free Lance.

Don D'Ammassa writes of the book that "Perry's version of the Hyborian world is rather darker than is portrayed in most other pastiches, and he always tells a good story."

Preceded by Conan the Champion	Tor Conan series (publication order)	Succeeded by Conan the Marauder
Preceded by "The Thing in the Crypt"	Complete Conan Saga (William Galen Gray chronology)	Succeeded by Conan the Hunter
