= Conan the Freebooter =

Book by Robert E. Howard

- Cover of first edition
- Author: Robert E. Howard and L. Sprague de Camp
- Cover artist: John Duillo
- Language: English
- Series: Conan the Barbarian
- Genre: Sword and sorcery
- Publisher: Lancer Books
- Publication date: 1968
- Publication place: United States
- Media type: Print (paperback)
- Pages: 223

Conan the Freebooter is a 1968 collection of five fantasy short stories by American writers Robert E. Howard and L. Sprague de Camp, featuring Howard's sword and sorcery hero Conan the Barbarian. Most of the stories originally appeared in the fantasy magazine Weird Tales in the 1930s. The book has been reprinted a number of times by various publishers, and has also been translated into German, Spanish, Portuguese, Dutch, Swedish, Italian, and Japanese. It was later gathered together with Conan and Conan of Cimmeria into the omnibus collection The Conan Chronicles (1989).

== Short stories ==
- "Introduction" (L. Sprague de Camp)
- "Hawks over Shem" (Robert E. Howard and L. Sprague de Camp)
- "Black Colossus" (Robert E. Howard)
- "Shadows in the Moonlight" (Robert E. Howard)
- "The Road of the Eagles" (Robert E. Howard and L. Sprague de Camp)
- "A Witch Shall be Born" (Robert E. Howard)

== Plot ==
In these stories from Conan's late twenties, the Cimmerian is a mercenary with the Free Company in the city-states of Shem and the lands to the north and east, a war leader of the steppe-raiding Kozaki, and finally a soldier in the service of the kingdom of Khauran.

Chronologically, the five short stories collected as Conan the Freebooter fall between Conan of Cimmeria and Conan the Wanderer.

== Sources ==
- Laughlin, Charlotte; Daniel J. H. Levack (1983). De Camp: An L. Sprague de Camp Bibliography. San Francisco: Underwood/Miller. pp. 40–41.

Preceded by Conan of Cimmeria	Lancer/Ace Conan series (chronological order)	Succeeded by Conan the Wanderer
