= The Thing in the Crypt =

Short story by Lyon Sprague de Camp

- Short story by L. Sprague de Camp and Lin Carter
- Country: United States
- Language: English
- Genre: Fantasy

Publication
- Published in: Conan
- Publication type: Collection
- Publisher: Lancer Books
- Media type: Print (paperback)
- Publication date: 1967
- Series: Conan the Barbarian

"The Thing in the Crypt" is a short story by American writers L. Sprague de Camp and Lin Carter, featuring the fictional sword and sorcery hero Conan the Cimmerian created by Robert E. Howard. It was based on a draft of a story by Carter, featuring his character Thongor as the protagonist.

It was originally published in the 1967 collection Conan.

== Plot summary ==
Conan has joined a band of warriors from the northern country of Asgard while taking part in a raid against the Hyperboreans living east of the region. As told in "Legions of the Dead", Conan is captured and enslaved by the fair-skinned Hyperboreans.

After escaping from his chains and slaying his captors, Conan makes his way south. Soon, he is pursued by a pack of hungry wolves. Armed only with a broken length of chain, Conan manages to fight off the starving wolves until he finds refuge near a range of hills. Inside one of the hills, he discovers the entrance to a buried crypt. After hiding within an ancient chamber, into which the wolves are strangely unwilling to follow him, Conan lights himself a fire. Suddenly, he discovers a grisly occupant.

Enthroned on a square boulder of black stone is the large mummified corpse of a man, apparently a great warrior or chieftain from ancient times. Noticing an iron sword which lies across the dead man's knees, Conan steals the weapon and claims it for himself. Exulting in his new-found sense of power, Conan hears the sound of a dry creaking and turns to face the mummy as it begins rising from its throne, having been raised from the dead by Conan's warcry. It advances on the young barbarian, but Conan, though frightened of the creature, stands his ground and engages in a desperate battle against the walking corpse. Finding that the wounds he inflicts are not enough to kill an undead creature, he eventually manages to hurl the mummy into the fire, utterly destroying it.

Not wanting to spend all night inside the haunted crypt, Conan emerges with his new weapon and, seeing no sign of the wolves, continues on his journey.

== Adaptations ==
This story was adapted by Marvel Comics in Conan the Barbarian #92 ("The Thing in the Crypt", November 1978) by writer/editor Roy Thomas and artist Ernie Chan.

The scenes in the story involving Conan's flight from a pack of wolves while discovering the crypt, sword and mummy are paralleled by scenes in the film Conan the Barbarian (1982) directed by John Milius. However, in the film, the mummy never comes to life.

The novelization, also written by De Camp and Carter, has the mummy come to life and fight Conan.

== Relationship with other works ==
The story shares many similarities with a tale from the 14th-century Icelandic Grettis saga. In the saga, Grettir Ásmundarson enters the mound of the chieftain Kár the Old. Grettir's objective was the treasure buried with the chieftain and, especially, a single edged seax, reputed to be a great weapon. Soon after Grettir enters the mound, the corpse of Kár comes to life and battles him.

In the 2022 movie The Northman by Robert Eggers, the hero Amleth purposely seeks a magical sword named "Draugr" from the mummy of a warrior ("the Mound Dweller") asleep on its throne located inside a burial mound. He battles the undead to obtain it and succeeds as in the Sprague De Camp story, but moments later Amleth, as in a dream, is seen taking the sword from the mummy's hands, who crumbles away on its throne as if the combat never took place as in the 1982 John Milius movie. Eggers admitted taking inspiration from Conan the Barbarian lore.

Preceded by "Legions of the Dead"	Complete Conan Saga (William Galen Gray chronology)	Succeeded by Conan the Defiant
