= Conan of Cimmeria =

Collection of short stories

- Cover of first edition
- Author: Robert E. Howard, L. Sprague de Camp and Lin Carter
- Cover artist: Frank Frazetta
- Language: English
- Series: Conan the Barbarian
- Genre: Sword and sorcery Fantasy
- Publisher: Lancer Books
- Publication date: 1969
- Publication place: United States
- Media type: Print (paperback)
- Pages: 189 pp

Conan of Cimmeria is a collection of eight fantasy short stories written by Robert E. Howard, L. Sprague de Camp, and Lin Carter and featuring Howard's sword and sorcery hero Conan the Barbarian. Most of the stories were originally published in various fantasy magazines. Lancer Books first published the paperback collection in 1969, and reprinted the book in 1970, 1972, and 1973. After Lancer's bankruptcy, Ace Books took over publication. Ace published its first edition in May 1977 and reprinted it in August 1977, 1979, 1980, 1982 (twice), 1984, 1985, 1990, and 1993. Sphere Books published the first British edition in 1974 and reprinted that edition in 1976 and 1987. The book has also been translated into German, Japanese, Spanish, Dutch, Swedish and Italian. It was gathered together with Conan and Conan the Freebooter into the omnibus collection The Conan Chronicles (Sphere Books, August 1989).

== Contents ==
- "Introduction" (L. Sprague de Camp)
- "The Curse of the Monolith" (L. Sprague de Camp and Lin Carter)
- "The Blood-Stained God" (Robert E. Howard and L. Sprague de Camp)
- "The Frost-Giant's Daughter" (Robert E. Howard, edited by L. Sprague de Camp)
- "The Lair of the Ice Worm" (L. Sprague de Camp and Lin Carter)
- "Queen of the Black Coast" (Robert E. Howard)
- "The Vale of Lost Women" (Robert E. Howard)
- "The Castle of Terror" (L. Sprague de Camp and Lin Carter)
- "The Snout in the Dark" (Robert E. Howard, L. Sprague de Camp and Lin Carter)

== Plot summary ==
In a number of episodes Conan, now in his mid to late twenties, is followed from the end of his career as a mercenary soldier for King Yildiz of Turan to his initial adventures in the black kingdoms of Kush. In between, he visits his native Cimmeria and the far north. Soon, Conan journeys southward where, in Argos, he gets his first taste of life as a sea rover as the right-hand man of the pirate queen Bêlit.

Chronologically, the eight short stories collected as Conan of Cimmeria fall between Conan and Conan the Freebooter.

== Notes ==
Preceded by Conan	Lancer/Ace Conan series (chronological order)	Succeeded by Conan the Freebooter
