= Conan the Marauder =

Book by John Maddox Roberts

- cover of Conan the Marauder
- Author: John Maddox Roberts
- Cover artist: Ken Kelly
- Language: English
- Series: Conan the Barbarian
- Genre: Sword and sorcery
- Publisher: Tor Books
- Publication date: 1988
- Publication place: United States
- Media type: Print (paperback)
- Pages: 277
- ISBN: 0-8125-4266-5

Conan the Marauder is a fantasy novel by American writer John Maddox Roberts, featuring Robert E. Howard's sword and sorcery hero Conan the Barbarian. It was first published in paperback by Tor Books in January 1988, and reprinted in 1992. The first British edition was published in paperback by Orbit Books in February 1991.

== Plot ==
The warlord, Bartatua, is uniting all the Hyrkanian tribes east of the Vilayet Sea into an army for world conquest, beginning with the resistant city of Sogaria. Meanwhile, an exiled Turanian wizard, Khondemir, plans on taking control over Bartatua's soldiers in pursuit of his own agenda. Caught in the middle are Princess Ishkala of Sogaria, a seductive spy named Lakhme, and the enslaved Conan, who must prove his loyalty towards Bartatua to escape his fate. Everything comes to a thrilling climax near an ancient Hyrkanian necropolis known as the City of Mounds.

== Reception ==
Don D'Ammassa, writing of Roberts' Conan novels, noted that "[a]lthough Roberts did not recreate Howard's character exactly, making him more intellectual and less inclined to solve every problem by hitting it with a sword, his evocation of the barbaric setting is superior to that of most of the other writers contributing to the series. Conan the Marauder (1987) and Conan the Rogue (1991) are the best of the set." Elsewhere he calls this novel a "standard but well constructed adventure."

Writing of some other Tor Conan novels, reviewer Ryan Harvey called Roberts "the most consistently successful of its stable of authors," and "the most consistently entertaining" of them, showing "deft ability with storytelling and action scenes, and a thankful tendency not to overplay his hand and try to ape Robert E. Howard's style."

Preceded by Conan the Defiant	Tor Conan series (publication order)	Succeeded by Conan the Warlord
Preceded by "The People of the Black Circle"	Complete Conan Saga (William Galen Gray chronology)	Succeeded by Conan and the Mists of Doom
