= Conan the Hero =

Novel by Leonard Carpenter

- Cover of the first edition.
- Author: Leonard Carpenter
- Cover artist: Ken Kelly
- Language: English
- Series: Conan the Barbarian
- Genre: Sword and sorcery
- Publisher: Tor Books
- Publication date: 1989
- Publication place: United States
- Media type: Print (Paperback)
- Pages: 278
- ISBN: 0-8125-3318-6

Conan the Hero is a fantasy novel by American writer Leonard Carpenter, featuring Robert E. Howard's sword and sorcery hero Conan the Barbarian and his black counterpart Juma of Kush, a character originally created by L. Sprague de Camp and Lin Carter for their Conan story "The City of Skulls". It was first published in paperback by Tor Books in February 1989, and was reprinted in September 1991 and March 1997.

== Plot ==
Conan and his friend Juma, both soldiers in the army of Turan, are stationed in the far-off jungles of Venjipur to defend its beleaguered royal family against the rebellious Hwong tribe. Both comrades are dissatisfied; they and those under them have been doing all the fighting, and see no chance for advancement, as their timid superior officers never risk their own lives in battle. In one skirmish, Conan rescues a girl named Sariya from being sacrificed by Mojurna, an evil shaman. This subsequently leads to trouble, when one of the Turanian officers attempts to rape her and is killed by Conan.

There are orders for Conan's execution, but he is the hero of Yaralet and a man whom King Yildiz has his eye on. However, Yildiz's captain devises a plan to get Conan out of circulation for a while by sending him deep into enemy territory. Conan's unit is ambushed, and he calls for reinforcements, only to have his request denied by one of the officers who has it in for him. His men defeat their attackers on their own—barely. The wounded Conan is carried back to camp by Juma. Meanwhile, his enemies plan to have him disposed of by their corrupt Venjipoorian allies. Accordingly, Conan is drugged and brought before the duplicitous Pheng Loon, leader of a Venjipoorian tribe the Turanians are supposedly there to help. Despite his hallucinations induced by the drug, Conan is able to throw off its influence and escape.

In segments interspersed with those detailing the main action, it's revealed that King Yildiz in Agraphur has his eye on Conan almost literally. His court wizard has kept Yildiz up-to-date on events in Venjipoor by scrying through a magic mirror. Also, the king's known enthusiasm for Conan has both fanned and inhibited his officers' machinations against the Cimmerian. Soon, Yildiz's intervention partiality results in Conan being summoned back to Agraphur for a ceremony. However, bureaucratic delays in his orders give the officers once last chance to try to get him killed. Again, Conan and Juma's forces are sent deep into rebel territory, where they're ambushed by numerically superior foes—but again they turn the tide and win. Their enemies now have no choice but to allow them to return to the capital.

After a long journey, Conan and Juma reach Agraphur, where King Yildiz gives Conan a medal and names him a Hero of Turan. Days of feasting and revelry ensue, to lead up to an official presentation ceremony. During these festivities, Conan works to uncover the identities of his enemies. Everything comes to a head at the ceremony, where Yildiz is menaced by a carnivorous vine sent by Mojorna. Conan and Juma defend the king against the plant, but delay destroying it long enough for it to consume the corrupt officers whose incompetence has cost so many lives in Venjipoor. Apprised of their plots and soured on foreign conquest, Yildiz commissions the Cimmerian to take over the Turanian forces in Venjipoor and set things right. Back in Venjipur, Conan shuts down the Turanian mission there. He is aided by the fact that Mojurna died when his plant was destroyed, but this development effectively denies him Sariya, who has taken the shaman's place as leader of the Hwong.

== Reception ==
Charles Saunders, noting that an Amazon.com reviewer had characterized the novel as “Conan in Vietnam” and "accuses Carpenter of loading Conan the Hero with 'every Vietnam cliche in the book,'" agrees that "the Vietnam references are far from subtle" and "[t]o anyone familiar with the United States’ involvement with the Vietnam War, the allegory is abundantly — and sometimes painfully — clear." Nonetheless, he considers that "Conan the Hero shows Carpenter's strengths in writing action and detail," noting that "[t]he friendship between Conan and Juma comes across as realistic, unlike certain contrived 'interracial-buddy' movies. ... Their ambience is similar to that between the late Robert B. Parker’s Spenser and Hawk, minus the racial bantering." These things aside, he feels that "sometimes, the plot of the novel hangs by the slenderest of threads. Were it not for the Conan-Juma element and the Vietnam allegory, this book would not stand out in the crowd of Conan pastiches. As it is, it only rises about half-a-head above that crowd."

Don D'Ammassa dismissed the book as "a not very well disguised parallel to the Vietnam war. Unfortunately, the plot is very loosely constructed in the first half and episodic in the second."

Preceded by Conan the Valiant	Tor Conan series (publication order)	Succeeded by Conan the Bold
Preceded by "The City of Skulls"	Complete Conan Saga (William Galen Gray chronology)	Succeeded by "The People of the Summit"
