= Tales of Conan =

Book by Robert E. Howard

- Cover of first edition
- Author: Robert E. Howard and L. Sprague de Camp
- Cover artist: Ed Emshwiller
- Language: English
- Series: Conan the Barbarian
- Genre: Sword and sorcery
- Publisher: Gnome Press
- Publication date: 1955
- Publication place: United States
- Media type: Print (hardback)
- Pages: 219

Tales of Conan is a 1955 collection of four fantasy short stories by American writers Robert E. Howard and L. Sprague de Camp, featuring Howard's sword and sorcery hero Conan the Barbarian. The tales as originally written by Howard were adventure yarns mostly set in the Middle Ages; they were rewritten as Conan stories by de Camp, who also added the fantastic element. Three of the stories also appeared in the fantasy magazine Fantastic Universe, two of them before publication of the collection and the other one after. The book has also been translated into Japanese. The collection never saw publication in paperback; instead, its component stories were split up and distributed among other "Conan" collections. "The Flame Knife" was later also published as an independent paperback.

Chronologically, the four short stories collected as Tales of Conan represent an add-on to Gnome's Conan series, coming between stories published in the remaining volumes. The first "tale" would fall within the collection The Coming of Conan, the second between that volume and the collection Conan the Barbarian, the third within Conan the Barbarian, and the fourth between that volume and the collection The Sword of Conan.

== Contents ==
- "Introduction" (P. Schuyler Miller)
- "Ghostly Note" (L. Sprague de Camp)
- "The Blood-Stained God"
- "Hawks Over Shem"
- "The Road of the Eagles"
- "The Flame-Knife"

== Reception ==
Galaxy reviewer Floyd C. Gale found the collection inferior to de Camp's own The Tritonian Ring, where de Camp "out Conaned Conan." Anthony Boucher noted that Miller's introduction "is so spiritedly infectious that one almost succumbs to his enthusiasm . . . until one tries to read the four long stories."

== Sources ==
- Chalker, Jack L.; Mark Owings (1998). The Science-Fantasy Publishers: A Bibliographic History, 1923-1998. Westminster, MD and Baltimore: Mirage Press, Ltd. p. 304.
- Laughlin, Charlotte; Daniel J. H. Levack (1983). De Camp: An L. Sprague de Camp Bibliography. San Francisco: Underwood/Miller. p. 96.

Preceded by The Return of Conan	Gnome Conan series (chronological order)	Succeeded by none
