= The Castle of Terror =

- Short story by L. Sprague de Camp and Lin Carter
- Country: United States
- Language: English
- Genre: Fantasy

Publication
- Published in: Conan of Cimmeria
- Publication type: Collection
- Publisher: Lancer Books
- Media type: Print (Paperback)
- Publication date: 1969
- Series: Conan the Barbarian

"The Castle of Terror" is a fantasy short story by American writers L. Sprague de Camp and Lin Carter, featuring the fictional sword and sorcery hero Conan the Barbarian created by Robert E. Howard. It was first published by Lancer Books in the paperback collection Conan of Cimmeria (1969), which was reprinted several times, first by Lancer and later by Ace Books through 1993. It has also been published by Sphere Books in the omnibus paperback collection The Conan Chronicles (1989). The story has been translated into German, Japanese, Spanish, Dutch, Italian, French, and Czech.

== Plot summary ==
Conan, having been exiled after a drought struck his Bamula tribe and murdering the high priest who blamed him for it, journeys across the savanna of Kush. He instinctively feels that something is watching him, but sees nothing. However, he is being followed by a pack of hungry lions.

An hour later, an exhausted Conan has fought off three lion attacks and is out of arrows. He runs through the darkness, with a lioness lapping at his heel, as a beam of moonlight peeks out from behind the clouds. Soon, Conan realizes the lions have stopped their pursuit as the vast plain mysteriously ends. Suddenly, Conan finds himself within the center of a giant circle of dead vegetation. At the edge, the lions simply look on as Conan examines his surroundings.

Not knowing how long the lions will be kept at bay by whatever force is preventing them from crossing into the circle, Conan travels deeper into the dead area. Soon, he discovers a ruined castle. As a storm begins forming right above him, Conan realizes his only shelter is the crumbled and misshapen structure ahead of him. Conan makes his way inside the ruined building, noting the black onyx stone and bizarre architecture before him. In fact, the halls and stairs appear to be built for a creature larger than human-sized while strange carvings riddle the walls. Conan wonders if perhaps this was an ancient citadel of the long-extinct Serpent Men he has heard of in legends.

Conan sleeps peacefully as the storm passes overhead, frequently jerking awake with his sword at the ready, seeming to hear whispering voices. He becomes convinced that the shadows are ghosts unsuccessfully trying to devour him. He's unaware that in one corner of the castle, the shadows are converging into a sentient mass which is planning to consume him.

Meanwhile, a band of Stygian slave traders are searching the savanna for tribesmen to capture. Caught in a violent storm, the men spy the castle in the distance and make their way towards shelter. They burst inside and distract the shadowy black mass that was slowly approaching Conan. Conan, now awake and contemplating the horror he had finally noticed, hides in the shadows while watching as the Stygians eat, drink, and finally fall asleep, with one standing guard. As the sentinel stands, back to his sleeping companions, a hideous shape made from the spirits of a thousand dead souls appears in the center of their camp. The monstrosity, with a hundred heads and a dozen feet and arms, throws itself onto a sleeping Stygian and rips him to shreds.

The Stygians rise up and attack the beast to no avail, as it methodically kills one after another. Conan, still hiding, decides to leave the scene while the monster is distracted by climbing out a window. He finds the slavers' horses and begins to mount one, when a lone Stygian, driven mad by his experience, bursts out of the castle. Conan is forced to kill the man to end his insanity. Soon, Conan hears the shuffling of movement towards the door. He doesn't wait to see who or what comes out, swiftly taking the Stygian's armor and spurring his horse into a gallop far away from the cursed castle.

== Adaptations ==
The story was adapted into comic book form in Conan the Barbarian no. 105 (Marvel Comics, Dec. 1979) by writer/editor Roy Thomas and artists John Buscema and Ernie Chan.

Preceded by "The Vale of Lost Women"	Complete Conan Saga (William Galen Gray chronology)	Succeeded by "The Snout in the Dark"
