= The City of Skulls (short story) =

Short story by L. Sprague de Camp and Lin Carter

- Short story by L. Sprague de Camp and Lin Carter
- Country: United States
- Language: English
- Genre: Sword and sorcery

Publication
- Published in: Conan
- Publication type: Collection
- Publisher: Lancer Books
- Media type: Print (Paperback)
- Publication date: 1967
- Series: Conan the Barbarian

"The City of Skulls" is a short story by American writers Lin Carter and L. Sprague de Camp, featuring the fictional sword and sorcery hero Conan the Cimmerian created by Robert E. Howard.

== Plot overview ==
Conan is a mercenary serving in the Turanian army along with his friend Juma of Kush, both of them having met while in combat. They are assigned by King Yildiz to his Turanian detachment, whose mission is escorting the king's daughter, Princess Zosara, to her wedding with the Great Khan of the Kuigar nomads in the eastern land of Hyrkania. Before they could reach their destination, the Turanian soldiers are ambushed by a tribe of warriors who descend upon them from the foothills of the Talakma Mountains. The Turanians are all killed in the battle except for Conan, Juma, and Zosara. The three survivors are captured by the tribesmen and journey into the fabled kingdom of Meru, which consists of seven sacred cities on the shore of an ancient lake within a tropical valley concealed by mountains on the north and south.

The three are taken to Shamballah, City of Skulls, the capital of Meru. Everywhere Conan looks, the architecture of the city is ornately designed or decorated in the likeness of human skulls craved from colored stone. They are eventually brought before the rimpoche or "god king" of Meru, Jalung Thongpa, a short, fat, ugly man of comical appearance who is nonetheless revered by his people as the reincarnated son of Yama the Demon King. Soon, it becomes clear that the reason for their capture was Jalung Thongpa's desire to claim Zosara for himself after his chief wizard, Tanzong Tengri, the Grand Shaman of Meru, revealed through magic her existence to the king. Conan then attacks the king in an attempt to escape, but is struck by the wizard's magic staff, causing him to fall into a deep slumber. Conan and Juma are then sentenced to a life of slavery at the oars aboard a ship as punishment.

The two adventurers eventually escape their fate and return to Shamballah, with the intent to rescue Zosara. They make their way through secret passages back into Jalung Thongpa's throne room, while he and a group of priests are performing a ritual to celebrate his marriage to the unwilling Zosara, who lays naked and shackled to an altar before a gigantic statue of the god Yama. Conan and Juma interrupt Thongpa's ceremony as they leap in wreaking havoc, killing many of the priests, including Tanzong Tengri, and forcing others to flee in panic. The king chants a prayer, which causes the great statue of Yama to come to life and advance toward Conan. However, Juma grabs the king and hurls him toward the statue. The rimpoche is then crushed by the god's foot which breaks the spell, causing the statue to become inanimate once again. Conan and Juma flee the city with Zosara and complete their mission.

== Publication history ==
- Conan (Lancer Books, 1967, later reissued by Ace Books)
- The Conan Chronicles (Sphere Books, 1989)

== Adaptation ==
The story was adapted for comics in Savage Sword of Conan #59 Dec,1980. Written by Roy Thomas with art by Mike Vosburg and Alfredo Alcala, and cover art by Clyde Caldwell.

Preceded by "The Hand of Nergal"	Complete Conan Saga (William Galen Gray chronology)	Succeeded by Conan the Hero
