= Conan the Warlord =

Novel by Leonard Carpenter

- Cover
- Author: Leonard Carpenter
- Cover artist: Ken Kelly
- Language: English
- Series: Conan the Barbarian
- Genre: Sword and sorcery
- Publisher: Tor Books
- Publication date: 1988
- Publication place: United States
- Media type: Print (Paperback)
- Pages: 273
- ISBN: 0-8125-4268-1

Conan the Warlord is a fantasy novel by American writer Leonard Carpenter, featuring Robert E. Howard's sword and sorcery hero Conan the Barbarian. It was first published in paperback by Tor Books in March 1988, and was reprinted in April 1997.

== Plot ==
During a prologue set in the Varikiel Marshes of northern Nemedia, a farm boy named Lar is bitten by a snake. The scene then switches to Conan, attempting to escape a Nemedian prison. While his attempted escape is thwarted, it does bring the Cimmerian to the attention of someone powerful, and he soon finds himself recruited to serve as a body-double for Favian, son of Baron Durwald from Dinadar. Favian and Conan both resemble each other, because Favian's mother was also a Cimmerian. Since the young noble is a spoiled brat, the two never hit it off well.

Conan receives a lecturer on upper-class Nemedian society, etiquette, and swordplay, though he finds civilized fencing rather weak in comparison to his broadsword. He remains suspicious of his new employer, at one point following Durwald as he goes inside a crypt, seemingly for the purposes of ancestral worship. His resentment towards Favian is cemented after he catches the lord whipping Ludya, a serving girl who Conan previously befriended, and intervenes to protect her. The matter is eventually resolved, and Ludya is removed from Favian's attention by returning her to the Varikiel Marshes. Soon, while learning the use of a chariot, the party Conan is with are ambushed. He and Favian drive away their attackers, and later get involved in putting down a local "rebellion" — which proves nothing more than the villagers' attempt to avoid the tolls at a royal bridge by establishing their own ferry. This and Favian's use of the right of droit du seigneur after a wedding, bring the barbarian's view of Nemedian nobility to an all-time low.

Everything changes when Favian is murdered by a woman who he attempts to exercise his "rights" on. It turns out she was merely using Favian's lust to lure him to his death. Conan recognizes the woman as one of their attackers, and also a damsel he had saved from rape during a raid on the village. However, Conan has little time to ponder this development, as he quickly finds himself accused of having killed both Favian and his employer, Baron Durwald. Soon, the castle is invaded by a spectral band of warrior, who are defeated only by the intervention of a host of actual rebels under the command of Durwald's disillusioned cousin. Conan, to avoid being executed for murder, sides with the newcomers. With the legitimate ruler and his heir dead, the two sides come to an agreement; they will form a new council to rule over Nemedia with Conan, impersonating Favian, as their puppet baron. Conan is less than pleased with their arrangement.

This state of affairs is interrupted by ominous tidings from the Varikiel Marshes and a plea for aid by Baron Ulf, ruler of the region. Conan, concerned about Ludya, joins some cavalry his master sent out to relieve Ulf. The army finds a devastated landscape burned, pillaged, and emptied of its inhabitants. The devastation is the work of a cult worshipping the Stygian god, Set. Days later, the soldiers encounter a fleeing band of natives, all driven insane by Set's plague of serpents. Among them is Baron Ulf, who regains enough sanity to warn of an ambush, and of a high priest of Set behind the invasion. In the ensuing battle, many of the soldiers are killed by a giant viper.

Guided by Ulf's directions, Conan goes in search of the priest of Set. The center of Set's plague is actually Ludya's village, and the "priest" Lar, the boy from the prologue, is the plague's first victim. Soon, Conan realizes Lar is evidently acting as the agent of a supernatural entity. Conan finds Ludya and frees her from the cult's control; she fills in the missing pieces of the puzzle. To get near the boy, both act as if they are under the influence of Set's plague. Their wariness proves wise when Lar sheds his skin and reveals himself as a reptilian monstrosity which Conan, in horror, impulsively batters to death with his warhammer. With Lar's demise, his evil army goes to pieces; some of his followers, now revealed as animated corpses, rapidly decompose, while the natives are reawaken into sanity.

Conan returns to Dinadar with Ludya, abandons his guise of Favian, and strikes out for the south, eager to see the last of Nemedia.

== Reception ==
Reviewer Don D'Ammassa calls "Carpenter's third Conan novel ... much better than the first two" and "surprisingly enjoyable", noting "[t]he story is quite methodically developed and well paced and the characters are much more complex than in the previous books."

Preceded by Conan the Marauder	Tor Conan series (publication order)	Succeeded by Conan the Valiant
Preceded by "The God in the Bowl"	Complete Conan Saga (William Galen Gray chronology)	Succeeded by "Rogues in the House"
