= The Vale of Lost Women =

Unfinished Conan story fragment by Robert E. Howard

- Short story by Robert E. Howard
- Original title: The Vale of Lost Women
- Country: US
- Language: English
- Genre: Fantasy

Publication
- Published in: The Magazine of Horror
- Publication type: Pulp magazine
- Publication date: 1967
- Series: Conan the Cimmerian

"The Vale of Lost Women" is a fantasy short story by American author Robert E. Howard. It is one of his original short stories about Conan the Cimmerian that was not published during his lifetime. The Magazine of Horror first published the story in its Spring, 1967 issue. Set in the fictional Hyborian Age, "The Vale of Lost Women" details Conan's rescue of a female Ophirean captive from the Bakalah tribe, on the (apparent) condition that he will receive sexual favors in return for his generosity.

== Plot summary ==
"The Vale of Lost Women" is another short story which, although included in the official lore of Conan the Cimmerian, was not published until long after the death of Robert E. Howard.

The story begins with Livia, a soft and civilized woman, being held captive by the Bakalah tribe. They capture Livia and her younger brother, Theteles, when the two were traveling across a remote jungle. Eventually, Theteles is killed by the natives following an act of excruciating torture. Conan appears as the leader of the Bamulas, a rival tribe. He negotiates a possible truce with the Bakalah and plans for a joint attack on Jihiji. After realizing Conan is white and may feel some kinship towards her, Livia asks him for his help. When Conan rejects her proposal, Livia offers herself to him as a reward for rescuing her.

Keeping his end of the bargain, Conan and his warriors attack the Bakalahs in the middle of their celebratory feast. He beheads their chief. The resulting carnage pushes the Livia to her breaking point. When she sees Conan drenched in blood walking toward her hut, carrying the chief's head, she believes he is coming to claim his reward. Frightened, she breaks their agreement by fleeing on horseback into the nearby jungle.

After escaping from the village, her horse stumbles, and Livia is thrown onto the ground. Unharmed, she descends into a valley filled with orchids. The valley is also inhabited by a tribe of brown-skinned lesbians. Believing she has found shelter from the blood-soaked "male brutality" of her Cimmerian savior, Livia feels safe amid the eerie beauty of her surroundings. Mesmerized by the hallucinogenic scent of a native flower, Livia barely notices she's being led to an altar-like section of the glade, where she is to be sacrificed to a bat-like entity, a "devil from the Outer Dark".

Conan, having pursued Livia and heard her cries for help, rushes to her aid. Conan drives away the bat-like creature. Conan tells Livia that he regrets the "foul bargain" he made with her and has no intention of forcing her to have sex, which in his view would have been as damnable an action as raping her. Since he believes Livia is not brave enough to survive within the Black Kingdoms, Conan tells her he will guide her to the Stygian borders where they will send her home to Ophir. Embarrassed by her grateful reaction, he tells Livia she is too soft to be "the proper woman for the war chief of the Bamulas".

== Style ==
Like "The Frost-Giant's Daughter," the plot is minimal and overshadowed by Howard's prose; nevertheless, the story is considered memorable. The entire story is told from Livia's point of view, and there is again a dream-like quality to much of it. Also, the creature from the stars which attacks Livia in the strange valley was intended to be from the Cthulhu Mythos by H. P. Lovecraft, an intellectual correspondent of Howard.

== Reception ==
James Van Hise, reviewing "The Vale of Lost Women", stated ""The Vale of Lost Women" is a minor effort", and added "it has more the air of a Conan pastiche than it does of Howard's more polished and well thought out tales."

== Publication history ==
The Magazine of Horror first published the story in its Spring, 1967 issue. It was republished in the collection Conan of Cimmeria (Lancer Books, 1967). It has also been republished in the collections Queen of the Black Coast (Grant, 1978), The Conan Chronicles Volume 1: The People of the Black Circle (Gollancz, 2000) and Conan of Cimmeria: Volume One (1932-1933) (Del Rey, 2003).

== Adaptation ==
Marvel Comics' 1970s Conan the Barbarian comic spent a long time detailing and adding to Conan's adventures on the Black Coast. Conan joins the Bamulas in #101, with the "Vale of Lost Women" finally adapted in #104.

Preceded by "The Hall of the Dead"	Original Howard Canon (publication order)	Succeeded by "Wolves Beyond the Border"
Preceded by "Drums of Tombalku"	Original Howard Canon (Dale Rippke chronology)	Succeeded by "The Pool of the Black One"
Preceded by Conan at the Demon's Gate	Complete Conan Saga (William Galen Gray chronology)	Succeeded by "The Castle of Terror"
