= The Flame Knife =

Book by Robert E. Howard

- Cover of the first stand alone publication
- Author: Robert E. Howard and L. Sprague de Camp
- Illustrator: Esteban Maroto
- Cover artist: Sanjulián
- Language: English
- Series: Conan the Barbarian
- Genre: Sword and sorcery
- Publisher: Ace Books
- Publication date: 1981
- Publication place: United States
- Media type: Print (Paperback)
- Pages: 157
- ISBN: 0-441-11666-3
- OCLC: 7696117

The Flame Knife is a 1955 fantasy novella by American writers Robert E. Howard and L. Sprague de Camp, featuring Howard's sword and sorcery hero Conan the Barbarian.

It was revised by de Camp from Howard's original story, a then-unpublished oriental tale featuring Francis X. Gordon titled "Three-Bladed Doom". De Camp changed the names of the characters, added the fantastic element, and recast the setting into Howard's Hyborian Age. The story was first published in the hardbound collection Tales of Conan (Gnome Press, 1955), and subsequently appeared in the paperback collection Conan the Wanderer (Lancer Books, 1968), as part of which it has been translated into German, Japanese, Spanish, Dutch, and Italian. It was published by itself in paperback book form by Ace Books in 1981, in an edition profusely illustrated by Esteban Maroto.

== Plot summary ==
Conan, leader of a band of Kozaki mercenaries in the service of King Kobad of Iranistan, quarrels with his employer over the king's command to capture Balash, chief of the Kushafi nomads and Conan's friend. Instead, Conan has his men warn the Kushafi. In the Gorge of Ghosts, the two armies are attacked by members of the Sons of Yezm, a cult of assassins whose symbol is the Flame Knife. The cultists kidnap Nanaia, Conan's current girlfriend. The Cimmerian tracks them to their stronghold, where he becomes embroiled in a conflict with his old rival Olgerd Vladislav, an opponent first encountered in Howard's story "A Witch Shall be Born".

== Sources ==
- Laughlin, Charlotte; Daniel J. H. Levack (1983). De Camp: An L. Sprague de Camp Bibliography. San Francisco: Underwood/Miller. p. 54.

Preceded by "The Devil in Iron"	Complete Conan Saga (William Galen Gray chronology)	Succeeded by Conan and the Shaman's Curse
