= The Curse of the Monolith =

- Short story by L. Sprague de Camp and Lin Carter
- Country: United States
- Language: English
- Genre: Fantasy

Publication
- Published in: Worlds of Fantasy
- Publication type: Magazine
- Media type: Print (Magazine)
- Publication date: 1968
- Series: Conan the Barbarian

"The Curse of the Monolith" is a short story by American writers L. Sprague de Camp and Lin Carter, featuring the fictional sword and sorcery hero Conan of Cimmeria created by Robert E. Howard. It was first published in the magazine Worlds of Fantasy in 1968 as "Conan and the Cenotaph".

== Plot summary ==
Conan is a mercenary serving in the army of the empire of Turan. Having attained the rank of captain, he has been chosen by King Yildiz to lead some cavalry and deliver a letter of friendship to King Shu of Kusan, a minor kingdom in the east. Shu sends Conan back to Turan with a formal letter of acceptance and provides him with a high noble of his own court, Duke Feng, to act as a guide and escort. However, unknown to both Conan and King Shu, Feng is a member of an isolationist political party known as the Golden Pheasant, which is against all contact between Kusan and the nations of the west. Determined to prevent Conan from delivering the letter of treaty back to Turan, Feng employs a ruse against Conan with a tale concerning the nearby tomb of a king which is supposed to contain a hoard of treasure. He tells Conan that if he should help him receive the treasure while his men are asleep, Feng will share half of what they find, to which Conan, although suspicious, agrees.

When they reach the site indicated by Feng, Conan sees a large burial mound with a black monolith of stone towering up into the night sky, the top of which is obscured by mist. As Conan ascends the mound and prepares to dig, he finds himself being pulled inexorably toward the monolith by an invisible force. Unable to break free Conan is hurled against the monolith and held fast. The duplicitous Feng then explains his true identity and purpose, and that the monolith is composed of a magnetic stone which exerted a force of attraction upon Conan's metal armor. Taking the letter of treaty from Conan, Feng begins to play musical notes on a flute. Responding to the strange piping, a monster in the form of a giant amoeba begins to slither down from the top of the shaft toward Conan. Struggling to escape, Conan eventually manages to cut the leather straps of his armour with a rusted dagger and tears himself free before the amoeba could devour him with its acidic pseudopods. Pouncing on Feng, Conan grabs him, retrieves the letter, and hurls him against the monolith, knocking him unconscious as he falls victim to the amorphous creature. Conan then sets fire to the monster, bringing an end to the "curse" once and for all.

== Adaptation ==
The story was adapted for comics in Savage Sword of Conan #33, by Donald F. Glut, Roy Thomas, Gene Colan, David Wenzel, and Pablo Marcos.

== Publication history ==
- Worlds of Fantasy magazine (Vol. 1, No. 1, 1968, published as "Conan and the Cenotaph")
- Conan of Cimmeria (Lancer Books, 1969, later reprinted by Ace Books)
- Warlocks and Warriors anthology (Mayflower, 1971, ed. Douglas Hill)
- The Conan Chronicles (Sphere Books, 1989)

Preceded by "The People of the Summit"	Complete Conan Saga (William Galen Gray chronology)	Succeeded by Conan the Valiant
