= The Blood-Stained God =

- Short story by Robert E. Howard and L. Sprague de Camp
- Country: United States
- Language: English
- Genre: Fantasy

Publication
- Published in: Tales of Conan
- Publication type: Collection
- Publisher: Gnome Press
- Media type: Print (Hardcover)
- Publication date: 1955
- Series: Conan the Barbarian

The Blood-Stained God is a 1955 fantasy novella by American writer Robert E. Howard and L. Sprague de Camp, featuring Howard's sword and sorcery hero Conan the Barbarian. It was revised by de Camp from Howard's original story, an unpublished non-fantasy oriental tale that featured Kirby O'Donnell titled "The Curse of the Crimson God". De Camp changed the names of the characters, added the sorcery elements, and recast the setting into Howard's Hyborian Age. The story was first published in the hardbound collection Tales of Conan (Gnome Press, 1955), and subsequently appeared in the paperback collection Conan of Cimmeria (Lancer Books, 1969), as part of which it has been translated into German, Japanese, Spanish, Dutch, and Italian. The stories elements were used on the 1976 Peter Pan Records audio drama record: Conan the Barbarian, entitled The Jewel of the Ages.

Preceded by Conan and the Spider God	Complete Conan Saga (William Galen Gray chronology)	Succeeded by Conan the Valorous
