= The Road of the Eagles =

- Short story by Robert E. Howard and L. Sprague de Camp
- Country: United States
- Language: English
- Genre: Fantasy

Publication
- Published in: Fantastic Universe
- Publication type: Magazine
- Media type: Print (Magazine)
- Publication date: 1955
- Series: Conan the Barbarian

"The Road of the Eagles" (also known as "Conan, Man of Destiny") is a 1955 fantasy novelette by American writer L. Sprague de Camp, based on a story by Robert E. Howard by the same name. Usually credited to Howard and de Camp, it features Conan the Barbarian.

== Differences from Howard's original story ==
De Camp gave Ivan Sablianka's role to Conan, changed the setting from the Ottoman Empire in 1595 into Howard's Hyborian Age and extensively re-worked the plot and story-line so that a new "Howard" story could be added to the collection Tales of Conan in 1955.

== Publication history ==
"The Road of the Eagles" was first published in Fantastic Universe in December 1955 under the title Conan, Man of Destiny. In the same year it was also published as part of Tales of Conan but now under the original title "The Road of the Eagles". In 1968 it was republished, under the same title, in the collection Conan the Freebooter.

The original story, now renamed "The Way of the Swords", can be found in The Road of Azrael published in 1979.

== Sources ==
- "The Barbarian Keep: Mistaken Identity: Are you Conan?".
- Howard, Robert E.; de Camp, L. Sprague (1989). Conan Piraten (in Swedish). Target Games AB. p. 4. ISBN 91-7898-054-2.

Preceded by Conan the Champion	Complete Conan Saga (William Galen Gray chronology)	Succeeded by "A Witch Shall be Born"
