= Conan (short story collection) =

Short story collection

- Cover of first edition
- Author: Robert E. Howard, L. Sprague de Camp and Lin Carter
- Cover artist: Frank Frazetta
- Language: English
- Series: Conan the Barbarian
- Genre: Sword and sorcery Fantasy short stories
- Publisher: Lancer Books
- Publication date: 1967
- Publication place: United States
- Media type: Print (paperback)
- Pages: 221 pp

Conan is a 1967 collection of seven fantasy short stories and associated pieces written by Robert E. Howard, L. Sprague de Camp and Lin Carter featuring Howard's seminal sword and sorcery hero Conan the Barbarian. Most of the stories were originally published in various pulp magazines. The book was first published in paperback by Lancer Books in 1967, and was reprinted in 1968, 1969, 1970, 1971, 1972 (twice) and 1973. After the bankruptcy of Lancer, publication was taken over by Ace Books. Its first edition appeared in May 1977, and was reprinted in 1979, 1982 (twice), 1983, 1984, 1985, 1986, and 1990. The first British edition was issued by Sphere Books in 1974, and was reprinted in 1977. The book has also been translated into German, Japanese, French, Spanish, Italian, Swedish and Dutch. It was gathered together with Conan of Cimmeria and Conan the Freebooter into the omnibus collection The Conan Chronicles (Sphere Books, August 1989).

== Reception ==
The book has been reviewed by:

- Fritz Leiber (1968) in Fantastic, May 1968
- Thomas M. Egan and Robert Reginald [as by Thomas M. Egan and Rex Miletus] (1979) in Science Fiction & Fantasy Book Review, August 1979
- Pierre Pelot (1980) in Fiction, #309

== Contents ==
- "Introduction" (L. Sprague de Camp)
- "Letter from Robert E. Howard to P. Schuyler Miller" (Robert E. Howard)
- "The Hyborian Age, Part 1" (Robert E. Howard)
- "The Thing in the Crypt" (L. Sprague de Camp and Lin Carter)
- "The Tower of the Elephant" (Robert E. Howard)
- "The Hall of the Dead" (Robert E. Howard and L. Sprague de Camp)
- "The God in the Bowl" (Robert E. Howard)
- "Rogues in the House" (Robert E. Howard)
- "The Hand of Nergal" (Robert E. Howard and Lin Carter)
- "The City of Skulls" (L. Sprague de Camp and Lin Carter)

== Plot ==
After a letter reflecting on Conan's life written by Howard to P. Schuyler Miller and John D. Clark, both fans of Howard's work, is an essay on the invented prehistory in which the hero's adventures are set tracing its development up to Conan's own time. The stories gathered in this collection then follow the Cimmerian from his escape from slavery in Hyperborea through his days as a youthful thief in Zamora, Corinthia, and Nemedia, to the beginning of his employment as a mercenary for King Yildiz of Turan. To Conan's discomfiture, the supernatural is his constant companion.

Chronologically, the seven short stories collected as Conan are the earliest in Lancer's Conan series. The stories collected as Conan of Cimmeria follow.

== Notes ==
Preceded by none	Lancer/Ace Conan series (chronological order)	Succeeded by Conan of Cimmeria
