= The Coming of Conan the Cimmerian =

Collection of stories by Robert E. Howard

- Cover of first edition (UK)
- Author: Robert E. Howard
- Illustrator: Mark Schultz
- Cover artist: Mark Schultz
- Language: English
- Series: Conan the Barbarian
- Genre: Sword and sorcery
- Publisher: Wandering Star Books (UK); Del Rey Books (US)
- Publication date: 2002 (UK), 2003 (US)
- Publication place: United States
- Pages: 496 p.
- Followed by: The Bloody Crown of Conan

The Coming of Conan the Cimmerian is the first of a three-volume set collecting the Conan stories by author Robert E. Howard with illustrations by Mark Schultz. It was originally published in 2002, first in the United Kingdom by Wandering Star Books under the title Conan of Cimmeria: Volume One (1932–1933) and the following year in the United States by Ballantine/Del Rey under the present title.

The Science Fiction Book Club reprinted the complete set in hardcover; the set presents the original, unedited versions of Howard's Conan tales. This volume includes thirteen short stories as well as miscellanea for Howard fans and enthusiasts such as drafts, notes, and maps. The collection also includes three stories that had not been published during Howard's lifetime: "The Frost-Giant's Daughter", "The God in the Bowl", and "The Vale of Lost Women". It also contains synopses, fragments, notes, and Howard's essay "The Hyborian Age".

== Contents ==
- "Foreword" (Mark Schultz)
- "Introduction" (Patrice Louinet)
- "Cimmeria" (poem)
- "The Phoenix on the Sword"
- "The Frost-Giant's Daughter"
- "The God in the Bowl"
- "The Tower of the Elephant"
- "The Scarlet Citadel"
- "Queen of the Black Coast"
- "Black Colossus"
- "Iron Shadows in the Moon"
- "Xuthal of the Dusk"
- "The Pool of the Black One"
- "Rogues in the House"
- "The Vale of Lost Women"
- "The Devil in Iron"
- "The Phoenix on the Sword" (first submitted draft)
- "Notes on Various Peoples of the Hyborian Age"
- "The Hyborian Age"
- Untitled Synopsis ("The Hall of the Dead")
- Untitled Synopsis ("The Scarlet Citadel")
- Untitled Synopsis ("Black Colossus")
- Untitled Fragment ("The Hand of Nergal")
- Untitled Synopsis #2 ("The Snout in the Dark")
- Untitled Draft ("The Snout in the Dark")
- "Hyborian Names and Countries"
- Hyborian Age Maps (drawn by Howard)
- "Hyborian Genesis: Notes on the Creation of the Conan Stories" (Patrice Louinet)
- "Notes on the Conan Typescripts and the Chronology" (Patrice Louinet)
- "Notes on the Original Howard Texts"

== See also ==
- Conan the Barbarian
- Robert E. Howard
