= Legions of the Dead =

Short story by Lyon Sprague de Camp

- Short story by L. Sprague de Camp and Lin Carter
- Country: United States
- Language: English
- Genre: Fantasy

Publication
- Published in: Conan the Swordsman
- Publication type: Collection
- Publisher: Bantam Books
- Media type: Print (Paperback)
- Publication date: 1978
- Series: Conan the Barbarian

"Legions of the Dead" is a short story by American writers L. Sprague de Camp and Lin Carter, featuring the fictional sword and sorcery hero Conan the Barbarian created by Robert E. Howard. In the opinion of de Camp critic Morgan Holmes, Catherine Crook de Camp may have had a hand in the writing as well. It was first published by Bantam Books in the paperback collection Conan the Swordsman in August 1978.

== Plot summary ==
The Hyperboreans have kidnapped Rann, the daughter of Njal, leader of a tribe of Aesir warriors. Soon, Njal leads his men on a raid to rescue her. The young Cimmerian, Conan, participates in their raid. Ominously, the thirty men sent ahead as scouts vanish, and, when the rest reach the enemy stronghold, they witness their comrades being tortured to death on the fortress walls. Conan infiltrates the castle and rescues Rann, while the Aesir travel back to Asgard, pursued by the Hyperboreans. Turning at bay, Njal's men realize that the reanimated corpses of their slain comrades are among those fighting against them. In the ensuing battle, Conan is captured by the enemy.

His escape is detailed in "The Thing in the Crypt", previously published but later chronologically.

== Adaptation ==
The story was adapted by Roy Thomas, Sal Buscema and Tony DeZuniga in Savage Sword of Conan #39, April 1979.

== Sources ==
- Laughlin, Charlotte; Daniel J. H. Levack (1983). De Camp: An L. Sprague de Camp Bibliography. San Francisco: Underwood/Miller. p. 239.
- Legions of the Dead title listing at the Internet Speculative Fiction Database

Preceded by Conan of Venarium	Complete Conan Saga (William Galen Gray chronology)	Succeeded by "The Thing in the Crypt"
