= Hawks over Shem =

Short story by L. Sprague de Camp

- Short story by Robert E. Howard and L. Sprague de Camp
- Country: United States
- Language: English
- Genre: Fantasy

Publication
- Published in: Fantastic Universe
- Publication type: Magazine
- Media type: Print (Magazine)
- Publication date: 1955
- Series: Conan the Barbarian

"Hawks over Shem" is a fantasy short story by American writer L. Sprague de Camp, featuring Conan the Barbarian and published in 1955. It's based on the story "Hawks over Egypt" by Robert E. Howard and is usually credited to both authors.

== Synopsis ==
Conan pursues General Othbaal, an ally turned traitor, into the city of Asgalun. He allies himself with Mazdak, one of two other generals involved in a power struggle serving under King Akhirom. Conan and Mazdak eliminate the other generals while causing Akhirom to be overthrown in a coup d'état. Conan must flee Asgalun, and a potentially profitable alliance with Mazdak, when it's discovered that he is actually Amra; a pirate who fleeced many nearby city-states.

== Differences from Howard's original story ==
De Camp gave Diego de Guzman's role to Conan, changed the setting from Egypt in 1021 A.D. into Howard's Hyborian Age, and extensively rewrote the plot so that a new "Conan" story could be included to the collection Tales of Conan in 1955.

== Publication history ==
"Hawks over Shem" was first published in Fantastic Universe during October 1955. In the same year, it was also published as part of Tales of Conan. In 1968, it was republished in the collection Conan the Freebooter.

The original story, "Hawks Over Egypt", can be found in The Road of Azrael published in 1979.

== Sources ==
- "The Barbarian Keep: Mistaken Identity: Are you Conan?".
- Howard, Robert E.; de Camp, L. Sprague (1989). Conan Piraten (in Swedish). Target Games AB. p. 4. ISBN 91-7898-054-2.

Preceded by Conan and the Emerald Lotus	Complete Conan Saga (William Galen Gray chronology)	Succeeded by "Black Colossus"
