= The Snout in the Dark =

Unfinished fragment of a Conan story by Robert E. Howard

- Short story by Robert E. Howard
- Original title: The Snout in the Dark
- Country: US
- Language: English
- Genre: Fantasy

Publication
- Published in: Conan of Cimmeria
- Publication type: Paperback
- Publisher: Lancer Books
- Publication date: 1969
- Series: Conan the Cimmerian

"The Snout in the Dark" is one of the original short stories by Robert E. Howard about Conan the Cimmerian, an untitled fragment begun in the 1930s but not finished or published in Howard's lifetime. It was completed and titled by L. Sprague de Camp and Lin Carter and in this form first published in the collection Conan of Cimmeria (1969). It has first been published in its original form in the collection Jewels of Gwahlur (Donald M. Grant, 1979) and later in The Conan Chronicles Volume 1: The People of the Black Circle (Gollancz, 2000) and Conan of Cimmeria: Volume One (1932-1933) (Del Rey, 2003).

== Plot ==
Howard's untitled synopsis begins in the walled city of Shumballa, in the land of Kush. Shumballa is inhabited by a tribe of warlike blacks called Gallahs, though the lighter-skinned aristocratic rulers are called Chagas. A Gallah commander is killed by a pig-like monster sent by the noble Tuthmes who intends to throw suspicion on Tanada, sister of the king.

Part of his plan is to present the king with a white slave, Diana, whom he has recently captured. When Tanada rides through the city outside the walls, known as Punt, she is attacked by an angry mob and rescued by Conan, who is made captain. Conan then puts down an uprising and gains the approval of the king. Soon, Tanada kidnaps Diana, who has attracted Conan's eye, and the witch-finder Agara discovers that Tuthmes is behind the murder of his commander. Tuthmes has Agara executed, or so he believes.

Diana, unable to reveal Tuthmes's plans to Tanada, is rescued by Conan and spends the night at his quarters. Meanwhile, Tuthmes has sent his monster to kill both Conan and Diana. Conan battles the creature into the streets where a sorcerer is being executed, and a still alive Agara appears to accuse Tuthmes. The crowd wildly attacks Tuthmes, his band of nobles, and the city itself as Conan and Diana escape.

== Adaptation ==
The story was adapted for comics by Roy Thomas and John Buscema in Marvel Comics' Conan the Barbarian #106-107.

In 2014 it was adapted by Fred Van Lente in its new Conan the Avenger series #1-7.

Preceded by "The Hand of Nergal"	Original Howard Canon (publication order)	Succeeded by none
Preceded by "Queen of the Black Coast"	Original Howard Canon (Dale Rippke chronology)	Succeeded by "The Slithering Shadow"
Preceded by "The Castle of Terror"	Complete Conan Saga (William Galen Gray chronology)	Succeeded by Conan the Barbarian (2011 novel) (Part 2)
