= Björn Nyberg =

Swedish writer (1929–2004)

- Born: Björn Emil Oscar Nyberg; 11 September 1929; Stockholm, Sweden
- Died: 16 November 2004 (aged 75)
- Occupations: Novelist, short story author
- Writing career
- Period: 1957–1978
- Genre: Fantasy

Björn Emil Oscar Nyberg (11 September 1929 – 16 November 2004), was a Swedish fantasy author best known for his additions to the series of Conan stories begun by Robert E. Howard. His primary contribution to the series was The Return of Conan (1957), which was revised for publication by L. Sprague de Camp. Nyberg lived in France.

The Return of Conan by Björn Nyberg and L. Sprague de Camp, Gnome Press, 1957

== Bibliography ==
=== Conan series ===
==== Books ====
- The Return of Conan (1957) (with L. Sprague de Camp)
- Conan the Avenger (collection) (1968) (with Robert E. Howard and L. Sprague de Camp)
- Conan the Swordsman (collection) (1978) (with L. Sprague de Camp and Lin Carter)
- Sagas of Conan (collection) (2004) (with Lin Carter and L. Sprague de Camp)

==== Short stories ====
- "The People of the Summit" (1970) (revised 1978, with L. Sprague de Camp)
- "The Star of Khorala" (1978) (with L. Sprague de Camp)

=== Other fiction ===
==== Short stories ====
- "Väktaren" (1958 - Swedish only)
- "The Agent" (1959)

=== Non-fiction ===
- "Conan and Myself," in ERBania 6, January 1959.
