= Conan the Barbarian (1982 novel) =

Novel by L. Sprague de Camp and Lin Carter

- Cover
- Authors: L. Sprague de Camp; Lin Carter; Catherine Crook de Camp
- Cover artist: Renato Casaro
- Language: English
- Series: Conan the Barbarian
- Genre: Sword and sorcery Fantasy novel
- Publisher: Bantam Books
- Publication date: 1982
- Publication place: United States
- Media type: Print (Paperback)
- Pages: 181
- ISBN: 0-553-22544-8
- OCLC: 8449461
- LC Class: CPB Box no. 2618 vol. 4

Conan the Barbarian is a 1982 fantasy novel written by L. Sprague de Camp, Lin Carter and Catherine Crook de Camp featuring Robert E. Howard's seminal sword and sorcery hero Conan the Barbarian, a novelization of the feature film of the same name. It was first published in paperback by Bantam Books in May 1982. The first hardcover edition was issued by Robert Hale in 1983, and the first British edition by Sphere Books in April 1988. A later novel with the same title by Michael A. Stackpole was issued by Berkley Books in 2011 as a tie-in with the 2011 remake of the 1982 film.

While the authorial role of Catherine Crook de Camp is not credited in the book, it has been acknowledged that the novel was a three-way collaboration, with Lin Carter writing the first draft, L. Sprague de Camp the second, and Catherine Crook de Camp the third. L. Sprague de Camp stated that "Credit for such virtues as this novel may possess should go to her."

== Plot summary ==
The book retells the story of the hero's youth, in a version quite different from the account established in previous tales by Howard, de Camp and Carter. Conan is the son of a blacksmith in barbaric Cimmeria, learning "the riddle of steel" from his father as the latter forges a sword. His village is massacred by the cultic followers of Thulsa Doom, an evil sorcerer, and Conan himself enslaved. Set with others to push a millstone, he develops prodigious strength over the years, ultimately pushing it all by himself. As an adult he wins his freedom and embarks on a life of adventure, ultimately wreaking his vengeance on the fiendish Doom with his father's sword.

== Thulsa Doom in other media ==
Thulsa Doom, the villain of both the film and the book, was borrowed from Howard's "King Kull" series, in which he figured as an antagonist of Kull. He had never previously been depicted as a foe of Conan.

== Reception ==
Reviewer Don D'Ammassa wrote that the novelization was "[n]ot bad, but it does not always feel like a Conan story."

Preceded by Conan and the Spider God	Bantam Conan series (publication order)	Succeeded by none
