= Conan and the Spider God =

1980 novel by L. Sprague de Camp

- Cover of first edition
- Author: L. Sprague de Camp
- Illustrator: Tim Kirk
- Language: English
- Series: Conan the Barbarian
- Genre: Sword and sorcery
- Publisher: Bantam Books
- Publication date: 1980
- Publication place: United States
- Media type: Print (Paperback)
- Pages: 175
- ISBN: 0-553-13837-5
- OCLC: 7052128

Conan and the Spider God is a fantasy novel by American writer L. Sprague de Camp featuring Robert E. Howard's sword and sorcery hero Conan the Barbarian. It was first published in paperback by Bantam Books in December 1980; later paperback editions were issued by Ace Books (April 1989, reprinted August 1991) and Tor Books (June 2003). The first hardcover edition was issued by Robert Hale in 1984, and the second by Tor Books in 2002. It was later gathered together with Conan the Swordsman and Conan the Liberator into the omnibus trade paperback collection Sagas of Conan (Tor Books, 2004).

Conan and the Spider God is the only fictional Conan work credited solely to de Camp; his other Conan stories being collaborations with Howard (posthumously), Lin Carter, and Björn Nyberg. De Camp also wrote numerous non-fiction pieces about Conan and Howard, both alone and with others.

== Plot summary ==
Conan finds himself in the kingdom of Zamora, a fugitive under suspicion of kidnapping Jamilah, the queen of Turan. Discovering she has actually been captured by devotees of the Zamoran spider god Zath, he journeys into the city of Yezud (first mentioned in the Howard story "The People of the Black Circle") to rescue Jamilah. Incidentally, Conan attempts to steal some opals used as eyes in the god's temple image.

Characteristically, de Camp's Conan is a more credible if less elemental figure than Howard's, carefully assessing the situation in Yezud and taking the time and effort to lay the groundwork for his foray rather than just barreling in swinging his sword.

Chronologically, Conan and the Spider God comes between the short stories "The Curse of the Monolith" and "The Blood-Stained God".

== Reception ==
Publishers Weekly briefly noted the appearance of the Tor hardcover, commenting that it offered "more dramatic adventures of Robert E. Howard's blue-eyed, broad-shoulder, sword-wielding hero" with "an epic battle" ensuing in the spider-god's temple.

Ryan Harvey considers de Camp "a fine writer, but ... not adept at sword and sorcery." He takes issue with "de Camp's ... rationalized approach to Conan's barbarism," in which "Conan spends a great deal of time thinking and reasoning through problems and speculating on choices," which "deprives the character of his primal instinctiveness and makes him seem inordinately civilized." He also feels that "the action stalls when Conan arrives in the city of Yezud and stays there," after which "the story turns into an unconnected array of scenes of characters milling about in taverns and arguing. Conan has murky motivations, and therefore the plot never moves along a direct or interesting line of action." Harvey also scolds de Camp for his use of "plot tokens" and "overtaxed faux archaic prose." On the plus side, he notes that "[t]he long-foreshadowed encounter with the super spider does have a feverish intensity" but "it fails to build to the proper conclusion," and "[t]he finale of the novel whimpers to a close."

Don D'Ammassa noted that "[d]e Camp wrote most of his Conan stories with Lin Carter, but this one was his alone and it's a good one." Of the plot, he wrote "[m]uch fun ensues."

== Comic adaptations ==
Marvel Comics published a comic adaptation of the book in issues 207-210 of the black and white comic magazine The Savage Sword of Conan in 1993.

Marvel also published a follow-up story in a three-issue miniseries called Conan: The Lord of the Spiders in 1998.

Preceded by Conan the Rebel	Bantam Conan series (publication order)	Succeeded by Conan the Barbarian
Preceded by Conan the Valiant	Complete Conan Saga (William Galen Gray chronology)	Succeeded by "The Blood-Stained God"
