= Conan the Liberator =

1979 novel by L. Sprague de Camp and Lin Carter

- Cover of first edition.
- Author: L. Sprague de Camp; Lin Carter
- Illustrator: Tim Kirk
- Cover artist: Bob Larkin
- Language: English
- Series: Conan the Barbarian
- Genre: Sword and sorcery
- Publisher: Bantam Books
- Publication date: 1979
- Publication place: United States
- Media type: Print (Paperback)
- Pages: 274
- ISBN: 0-553-12706-3
- OCLC: 6390811

Conan the Liberator is a fantasy novel by American writers L. Sprague de Camp and Lin Carter, featuring Robert E. Howard's sword and sorcery hero Conan the Barbarian. It was first published in paperback by Bantam Books in February 1979, and reprinted in 1982; later paperback editions were issued by Ace Books (July 1987 and April 1991). The first hardcover edition was published by Tor Books in June 2002; a trade paperback followed from the same publisher in 2003. The first British edition was from Sphere Books (July 1987). The novel was later gathered together with Conan the Swordsman and Conan and the Spider God into the omnibus collection Sagas of Conan (Tor Books, 2004).

Howard himself never wrote the tale of this turning point of Conan's life, when, starting as wandering mercenary and pirate, he became a king. The only detail provided in the canonical Howard stories is that Conan strangled Numedides on his own throne and then crowned himself with the dead king's crown. Carter and de Camp, filling in this link in Conan's career, show that a prolonged, arduous military campaign was needed before he got to this point, that there were many setbacks and moments when all seemed lost. Also, while Conan's own courage and perseverance played a crucial role, his success also owed a great deal to a band of loyal and dedicated companions, some of whom did not survive to see the final victory.

== Plot summary ==
Following the events of the story "The Treasure of Tranicos", Conan joins a conspiracy of former comrades-in-arms to overthrow Numedides, the mad and tyrannical king of Aquilonia. As commander of the rebel forces, he has the prospect of becoming king himself if they succeed. However, Conan has not only Numedides' loyal troops, led by General Procas, to overcome, but the magic of an evil sorcerer named Thulandra Thuu.

Chronologically, Conan the Liberator overlaps the events of the story "Wolves Beyond the Border", and is followed by the story "The Phoenix on the Sword".

== Adaptation ==
The de Camp version of the story was adapted by Roy Thomas and Tony DeZuniga in Savage Sword of Conan #49-52.

== Reception ==
Shortly before publication of the first hardcover edition in 2002, Kirkus Reviews pronounced that "[o]nce again, de Camp and Carter mime Howard's hyperbolic spirit and majestic inverted syntax with great style." The review expressed no other opinion as to the merit of the novel.

Michael Rogers in Library Journal wrote "[t]he plot is typical," but "[d]espite the corny story, de Camp and Carter's solid rep in the sword and sorcery world will guarantee fun for fans of the series."

Don D'Ammassa called the book "a pretty good story" and noted that "the military encounters are very well constructed."

Preceded by Conan the Swordsman	Bantam Conan series (publication order)	Succeeded by The Sword of Skelos
Preceded by "Wolves Beyond the Border"	Complete Conan Saga (William Galen Gray chronology)	Succeeded by "The Phoenix on the Sword"
