= Roland J. Green bibliography =

This is complete works by American fantasy writer Roland J. Green.

== Bibliography ==
=== Wandor series ===
- Wandor's Ride (1973) OCLC 2168916
- Wandor's Journey (1975) ISBN 0380003287
- Wandor's Voyage (1979) ISBN 038044271X
- Wandor's Flight (1981) ISBN 0380778343

=== Conan (shared universe) ===
- Conan the Valiant (1988)
- Conan the Guardian (1991)
- Conan the Relentless (1992)
- Conan and the Gods of the Mountain (1993)
- Conan at the Demon's Gate (1994)
- Conan and the Mists of Doom (1995)
- Conan and the Death Lord of Thanza (1997)

=== Dragonlance Warriors (shared universe) ===
- Knights of the Crown (1995)
- Knights of the Sword (1995)
- Knights of the Rose (1996)
- The Wayward Knights (1997)

=== Peace Company ===
- Peace Company (1985) ISBN 0441657400
- These Green Foreign Hills (1987) ISBN 0441657419
- The Mountain Walks (1989) ISBN 0441657427

=== Starcruiser Shenandoah ===
- Squadron Alert (1989) ISBN 0451161564
- Division of the Spoils (1990) ISBN 0451450248
- The Sum of Things (1991) ISBN 0451450809
- Vain Command (1992) ISBN 0451452054
- The Painful Field (1993) ISBN 0451452801
- Warriors for the Working Day (1994) ISBN 0451453492

=== Janissaries series ===
- Janissaries II: Clan and Crown (1982) (with Jerry Pournelle) ISBN 0441382940
- Janissaries III: Storms of Victory (1987) (with Jerry Pournelle) ISBN 0441382975
- Tran (1996) (with Jerry Pournelle) (omnibus of the two novels above, the second and third in the Janissaries series) ISBN 0671877410
- Lord of Janissaries (2015) (with Jerry Pournelle) ISBN 147678079X

=== Richard Blade series ===
Green wrote books 9-29, 31-37 of the Richard Blade series (as by "Jeffrey Lord"). The series was published by Pinnacle Books using the house pseudonym.

- Kingdom of Royth (1974) ISBN 0-523-00295-5
- Ice Dragon (1974) ISBN 0-523-00768-X
- Dimension of Dreams (1974) ISBN 0-523-00474-5
- King of Zunga (1975) ISBN 0-523-00523-7
- The Golden Steed (1975) ISBN 0-523-00559-8
- The Temples of Ayocan (1975) ISBN 0-523-00623-3
- The Towers of Melnon (1975) ISBN 0-523-00688-8
- The Crystal Seas (1975) ISBN 0-523-00780-9
- The Mountains of Brega (1976) ISBN 0-523-40790-4
- Warlords Of Gaikon (1976) ISBN 0-523-00822-8
- Looters of Tharn (1976) ISBN 0-523-00855-4
- Guardians Of The Coral Throne (1976) ISBN 0-523-00881-3
- Champion of the Gods (1976) ISBN 0-523-00949-6
- The Forests of Gleor (1976) ISBN 0-523-00993-3
- Empire of Blood (1977) ISBN 978-0523417233
- The Dragons of Englor (1977) ISBN 978-0523402604
- The Torian Pearls (1977) ISBN 978-0523401119
- City of the Living Dead (1978) ISBN 0-523-40193-0
- Master of the Hashomi (1978) ISBN 0-523-40205-8
- Wizard of Rentoro (1978) ISBN 0-523-40206-6
- Treasure of the Stars (1978) ISBN 0-523-40207-4
- Gladiators of Hapanu (1979) ISBN 0-523-40648-7
- Pirates Of Gohar (1979) ISBN 0-523-40679-7
- Killer Plants Of Binnark (1980) ISBN 0-523-40852-8
- The Ruins of Kaldac (1981) ISBN 0-523-41208-8
- The Lords of the Crimson River (1981) ISBN 0-523-41209-6
- Return to Kaldak (1983) ISBN 0-523-41210-X
- Warriors of Latan (1984) ISBN 0-523-41211-8

=== Other novels ===
- Jamie the Red (1984) (with Gordon R. Dickson) ISBN 0441382452
- Assignment - Hellhole (1983) (with Andrew J. Offutt [as by "John Cleve"]) Book 14 in the "Spaceways" series
- The Book of Kantela (1985) (with Frieda A. Murray) ISBN 0312940351
- Great Kings' War (1985) (with John F. Carr) the sequel to Lord Kalvan of Otherwhen by H. Beam Piper
- The Tale of the Comet (1997) In the Fantastic Adventures series. ISBN 0786906545
- On the Verge (1998) ISBN 0786911913
- Voyage to Eneh (2000) ISBN 0312872313

=== Anthologies ===
- Women at War (1995) (with Lois McMaster Bujold) ISBN 0312857926
- Alternate Generals (1998) (with Martin H. Greenberg and Harry Turtledove) ISBN 0671878867
- Alternate Generals III. New York: Baen. 2005. ISBN 1416521143. OCLC 416365879.(with Harry Turtledove)
- Worlds of Honor (1999) (short story Deck Load Strike)

=== Short stories ===
- Call Him Meier (1994) (collected in Christopher Stasheff's anthology Dragon's Eye)
- She Who Might Be Obeyed, with Frieda A. Murray (1995) (collected in John Varley's anthology Superheroes)
- "Enchanter Kiev" (1995) with Frieda A. Murray
- "Chozzerai" (1996) with Frieda A. Murray
- "To Speak with Men and Angels" (1996) with Frieda A. Murray
- The King of Poland's Foot Cavalry (1997) (collected in Mike Resnick's alternate history anthology Alternate Tyrants)
- George Patton Slept Here (2002) (collected in Harry Turtledove's anthology Alternate Generals II)
- It Isn't Every Day of the Week (2005) (collected in Harry Turtledove's anthology Alternate Generals III)
