= Conan of the Isles =

Novel by Lin Carter

- Cover of first edition
- Authors: L. Sprague de Camp and Lin Carter
- Cover artist: John Duillo
- Language: English
- Series: Conan the Barbarian
- Genre: Sword and sorcery
- Publisher: Lancer Books
- Publication date: 1968
- Publication place: United States
- Media type: Print (Paperback)
- Pages: 189

Conan of the Isles is a fantasy novel by American writers L. Sprague de Camp and Lin Carter, featuring Robert E. Howard's sword and sorcery hero Conan the Barbarian. It was first published October 1968 in paperback by Lancer Books; publication was then taken over by Ace Books, starting from May 1977.

In the novel, Conan is his mid-60s. He is the widowed king of Aquilonia, fearing that he is destined to die in bed, helpless while surrounded by physicians and whispering courtiers. His eldest son and heir Conn is 20-years-old. A new threat appears when the wizard-priests of the dark god Xotli, descendants of refugees from sunken Atlantis, start kidnapping random Aquilonians to offer human sacrifice to their god. After being contacted by the ghost of the prophet Epemitreus, Conan abdicates the throne and travels to the pirate hideout on the Barachan Islands. He recruits a polyglot crew of pirates and sets sail for the city of Ptahuacan in order to face the priests.

The novel was intended to be Conan's final adventure, though the character is alive at its end. After a crime boss takes control of Ptahuacan in a coup d'état, Conan and his crew set sail towards the unexplored west coast of the Western Ocean (Atlantic Ocean). Their ship is last mentioned while skirting the Antillian Isles (Antilles), and would be remembered in the legends of Mayapan as Quetzlcoatl (the "winged (or feathered) serpent").

== Plot summary ==
King Conan, in his mid-sixties, grows restless - especially since the death of his beloved wife Zenobia. With the approach of old age, what he most dreads is to die in bed – helpless, surrounded by physicians and whispering courtiers. He would much rather die in battle – but there seems little prospect of that, since he himself made Aquilonia powerful and prosperous while eliminating virtually all threats. The prospect he faces as King is many boring years of tax administration and adjudicating complicated legal cases. Meanwhile, Conan's eldest son, Conn, is now twenty years old – a very worthy son and heir who has already given a very good account of himself at the age of thirteen (Conan of Aquilonia), and is fully ready to assume the throne.

Suddenly, there is a new crisis: Conan's old friend and loyal supporter, Count Trocero of Poitian, is snatched away from the Council Chamber itself by Red Shadows, mystical entities of unknown origin. Although it happened in front of Conan himself, inside a room filled with courtiers and guards, there was nothing anyone could do against these insubstantial shadows who suddenly appear, grab a man, and disappear along with him. This is followed by the Red Shadows striking again and again, snatching at random men and women of all ages or social positions. As would later turn out, these sinister acts were perpetrated by the wizard priests of the dark god Xotli, descendants of refugees from sunken Atlantis, who settled on the other side of the ocean and seek to placate their demon god's voracious appetite for human sacrifice.

In his troubled sleep, Conan is visited by the ghost of a wise and ancient prophet, Epemitreus, who tells him that the source of the Red Shadows is in the unknown lands beyond the Western Ocean. Epemitreus, speaking for the gods, tells Conan that this is a threat to the whole world, and charges him to do what he was half-inclined to do anyway – i.e., abdicate, sail across the ocean, track the Red Shadows to their source, and eliminate the threat. That very night, Conan writes out his abdication letter and bids farewell to his son who would become King Conan II, with some final advice on how to be a King: "Discount nine-tenths of all flattery, and never punish the bearer of bad news."

At a pirate hideout on the Barachan Islands, Conan finds out that his old reputation as the pirate captain, Amra the Lion, is very much alive. He and his old comrade, Sigurd of Vanaheim, have no trouble in recruiting a highly spirited and polyglot crew of pirates while setting off westwards on board The Red Lion. They emerge victorious from their first encounter with the dark priests, one of whom is guiding a magical green galley with no oarsmen in sight. However, during his second encounter, an armada of Dragon Ships sent by the Xotli priests overcome Conan and his crew. All the pirates are knocked unconscious by sleeping gas and taken ashore, to be eventually sacrificed to Xotli with their hearts torn out of their chests.

Conan alone manages to escape, stealing a breathing apparatus from one of his attackers and diving into the sea. After some underwater adventures (he is threatened by a giant octopus and a shark; the two start fighting each other and forget about him), Conan comes ashore. Finding himself in a completely strange city with no idea of the language or culture, Conan finds his bearings at record speed. First, he finds refuge with a prostitute named Catlaxoc, while learning from her the language and customs of the ancient city of Ptahuacan. Soon, Conan proves to Catlaxoc and himself that in his sixties he's still capable of pleasing love-making, and breaking her heart with his departure a few days later. Then, realizing that a city this big must have a flourishing underworld, he makes contact with a local crime boss, Metamphoc, and whom he instantly reaches a perfect understanding "between two old thieves".

With the help of Metamphoc and his Guild of Thieves, Conan journeys through the vast caverns deep beneath the city, in an effort to save his crewmembers before they are sacrificed. The underground route is highly dangerous, and for a moment it seems that Conan's long and illustrious career would end with him being devoured by a swarm of giant rats. Fortunately, he overcomes this threat as well. After traveling across an underground river, Conan arrives underneath a dark pyramid, at the top of which the victims are sacrificed. Their life force is greedily drunk by a physically-manifested Xotli, while the victim's bodies are thrown into a cavern and eaten by flightless dragons (in fact, giant lizards). Conan, pursued by some of these dragons, manages to open a giant doorway crafted from copper and unleashes the monsters onto the gathered Xotli priesthood.

The dragons' entrance comes in the nick of time to save Sigurd and the other pirates from being sacrificed, creating a distraction which enables them to fight off their captors, while joined by Conan himself. But aside from the priests and their soldiers, there is also the direct threat of Xotli in person – the demon-god hovering in the air, annoyed at the interruption of his meal, and correctly identifying Conan as the source of his problems.

Conan finds himself in a titanic mental struggle with Xotli. He resists the dark god to his utmost, but even the strongest mortal cannot win against a god. However, before sending Conan on this mission, Epemitreus had provided him with a powerful talisman for just such a contingency. Smashing the talisman summons Mithra, an Aquilonian god, in person – who is well able to deal with Xotli. Mithra warns Conan and his pirates, as well as the citizens of Ptahuacan, to flee from the vicinity. Soon, a titanic struggle between the two gods occur, in which the sacrificial pyramid and much of the city's center is destroyed, and Xotli is finally banished for good.

When the terrified citizens return from the countryside during their escape, they discover that Metamphoc and his thieves have taken control of the battered city. While not an ideal ruler, the crime boss would in Conan's view be a definite improvement over the murderous priests. In the prisons, hundreds of intended victims are found and released, but nothing more is heard of Conan's old friend, Count Trocero of Poitian. Sadly, it seems that for him, Conan's overthrow of the dark priests came too late.

The novel ends with Conan literally sailing off into the sunset: "A few hours later, the great ship, which the natives of Mayapan were to call Quetzlcoatl – meaning "winged (or feathered) serpent" in their uncouth tongue – lifted anchor. She sailed south and then, skirting the Antillian Isles, into the unknown West. But whither, the ancient chronicle, which endeth here, sayeth not."

== Aftermath ==
Despite the seemingly definitive ending of the novel, various authors who have written about Conan offer hints as to subsequent events. Robert E. Howard wrote: "Conan traveled widely, not only before his kingship, but after he was king. He travelled to Khitai and Hyrkania, and to the even less known regions north of the latter and south of the former. He even visited a nameless continent in the western hemisphere, and roamed among the islands adjacent to it. How much of this roaming will get into print, I can not foretell with any accuracy."

Later authors followed up on most of Howard's indications. Björn Nyberg sent King Conan to Khitai, Hyrkania, and Vendhya in The Return of Conan (Gnome Press, 1957). The last of Conan's defensive wars followed by the ultimate war of aggression are presented by Leonard Carpenter in Conan the Great (Tor Books, 1990); his answer to whether Conan succeeded or perished in the attempt is a firm "neither." De Camp and Carter recount a couple later aggressive wars, not linked to world conquest, in Conan of Aquilonia (Ace Books, 1977). Conan's roaming among the islands adjacent to the nameless western continent is covered in Conan of the Isles itself, with the continent itself specified as his next destination. Isles indicates that he did indeed reach it, as the book records the name subsequently given his ship in Mayapan (showing that the "ancient chronicle" does say whither he goes, despite concluding before he gets there).

Some later events in Aquilonia, set during the sixth year of the reign of Conan's son Conn, are presented by Roland J. Green in the prologue and epilogue of Conan at the Demon's Gate, which form a framing story to his novel's main narrative. There is no indication in the framing sequence that Conan has been heard from since his abdication.

De Camp's final musings on Conan's fate are offered in Conan the Indestructible, dated May 1984, the last version of the 1938 Miller/Clark essay "A Probable Outline of Conan's Career" that he had revised and extended over many years: "In the end, Conan sailed off to explore the continents to the west (Conan of the Isles). Whether he died there, or whether there is truth in the tale that he strode out of the West to stand at his son's side in a final battle against the Aquilonia's foes, will be revealed only to him who looks, as Kull of Valusia once did, into the mystic mirrors of Tuzun Thune." The awareness by the "ancient chronicle" of Conan's adventures in Antillia would seem to support an ultimate return to Aquilonia, and thus de Camp's second alternative.

Whether or not there was a "last battle", Lin Carter provides the Cimmerian's final earthly utterances in the poem "Death-Song of Conan the Cimmerian" in Dreams from R'lyeh, Arkham House, 1975.

== Reception ==
Don D'Ammassa, noting that "[t]his was supposed to be Conan's final adventure," finds "[h]is preparations for his adventure ... oddly inadequate and his eventual victory ... about as obvious a deus ex machine as you can imagine. His adventures in between are uninspired and at sixty years of age, not entirely believable."

Preceded by Conan of Aquilonia	Lancer/Ace Conan series (chronological order)	Succeeded by none
Preceded by "Shadows in the Skull"	Complete Conan Saga	Succeeded by Conan at the Demon's Gate (framing sequence)
