= Conan (books) =

Fantasy book series created by Robert E. Howard

The Conan books are sword and sorcery fantasies featuring the character of Conan the Cimmerian originally created by Robert E. Howard. Written by numerous authors and issued by numerous publishers, they include both novels and short stories, the latter assembled in various combinations over the years by the several publishers. The character has proven durably popular, resulting in Conan stories being produced after Howard's death by such later writers as Poul Anderson, Leonard Carpenter, Lin Carter, L. Sprague de Camp, Roland J. Green, John C. Hocking, Robert Jordan, Sean A. Moore, Björn Nyberg, Andrew J. Offutt, Steve Perry, John Maddox Roberts, Harry Turtledove, and Karl Edward Wagner. Some of these writers finished incomplete Conan manuscripts by Howard, or rewrote Howard stories which originally featured different characters. Most post-Howard Conan stories, however, are completely original works. In total, more than fifty novels and dozens of short stories featuring the Conan character have been written by authors other than Howard. This article describes and discusses notable book editions of the Conan stories.

== Gnome Press series, 1950–1957 ==
The Gnome Press edition of Conan was the first hardcover collection of Howard's Conan stories, including all the original Howard material known to exist at the time, some left unpublished in his lifetime. Not published in order of previous publication, Gnome's volumes were organized to present the stories in order of their internal chronology, the sole exception being Tales of Conan, which skipped around to present random episodes from various points in the protagonist's career. Some stories in two of the later volumes (The Coming of Conan and King Conan) were completed or revised by L. Sprague de Camp; another (Tales of Conan) consisted of non-Conan Howard stories that de Camp rewrote as Conan yarns. The last published volume of the Gnome edition was the first Conan story by an author other than Howard, namely Björn Nyberg, and was revised by de Camp.

1. The Coming of Conan (1953)
2. Conan the Barbarian (1955)
3. The Sword of Conan (1952)
4. King Conan (1953)
5. Conan the Conqueror (also known as The Hour of the Dragon; 1950)
6. The Return of Conan (1957; by Björn Nyberg and L. Sprague de Camp)
7. Tales of Conan (1955; originally non-Conan Howard stories rewritten as Conan stories by L. Sprague de Camp)

== Lancer/Ace paperback series, 1966–1977 ==
The cover of Conan the Usurper (1967); art by Frank Frazetta.

This was the first comprehensive paperback edition, which compiled the existing Howard and non-Howard stories together with new non-Howard stories in order of internal chronology, to form a complete account of Conan's life. Nine of the books are collections of short stories, while three (numbers 6, 9 and 12, in the following list) are novels. Lancer Books initially numbered its volumes in order of publication, switching to a chronological numbering for volumes published later and reprints of the earlier volumes. Lancer went out of business before bringing out the entire series, and publication was completed by Ace Books.

This edition of the stories was the one that introduced Conan into popular culture. Undertaken under the direction of de Camp and Carter, it includes all the original Howard material, including that left unpublished in his lifetime and fragments and outlines. De Camp edited much of the material and he and Carter completed the stories that were not in finished form. New stories written entirely by themselves were added as well. In the following list, volumes 6 and 11–12 do not contain any material by Howard. Of the thirty-five stories in the other eight volumes, nineteen were published or completed by Howard during his lifetime, ten are rewritten or completed from his manuscripts, fragments or synopses, and six are the sole work of de Camp and Carter. Eight of the eventual twelve volumes published in this series featured cover paintings by Frank Frazetta.

1. Conan (1967, by Robert E. Howard, L. Sprague de Camp, and Lin Carter)
2. Conan of Cimmeria (1969, by Robert E. Howard, L. Sprague de Camp, and Lin Carter)
3. Conan the Freebooter (1968, by Robert E. Howard and L. Sprague de Camp)
4. Conan the Wanderer (1968, by Robert E. Howard and L. Sprague de Camp)
5. Conan the Adventurer (1966, by Robert E. Howard and L. Sprague de Camp)
6. Conan the Buccaneer (1971, by L. Sprague de Camp and Lin Carter)
7. Conan the Warrior (1967, by Robert E. Howard)
8. Conan the Usurper (1967, by Robert E. Howard and L. Sprague de Camp)
9. Conan the Conqueror (also known as The Hour of the Dragon; 1967, by Robert E. Howard)
10. Conan the Avenger (also known as The Return of Conan; 1968, by Björn Nyberg, L. Sprague de Camp, and Robert E. Howard)
11. Conan of Aquilonia (1977, by L. Sprague de Camp and Lin Carter)
12. Conan of the Isles (1968, by L. Sprague de Camp and Lin Carter)

== Donald M. Grant series, 1974–1989 ==
A series of illustrated limited editions of the Howard Conan stories only, containing one or two stories per volume. The series lapsed before publishing the last five of the stories and three of the fragments.

- The People of the Black Circle (1974)
- A Witch Shall be Born (1975)
- The Tower of the Elephant (1975) (also includes "The God in the Bowl")
- Red Nails (1975)
- The Devil in Iron (1976) (also includes "Shadows in Zamboula")
- Rogues in the House (1976) (also includes "The Frost-Giant's Daughter")
- Queen of the Black Coast (1978) (also includes "The Vale of Lost Women")
- Jewels of Gwahlur (1979) (also includes "The Snout in the Dark" fragment)
- Black Colossus (1979) (also includes "Shadows in the Moonlight")
- The Pool of the Black One (1986) (also includes "Drums of Tombalku" fragment)
- The Hour of the Dragon (1989)

== Berkley series, 1977 ==
Edited by Karl Edward Wagner, this series, like the Grant edition, included only the Howard Conan stories in their original published form, and included all the Conan stories in the public domain at the time (though their copyright status was not widely known). Wagner's introductions are openly dismissive of the editorial revisions done by de Camp and Carter on the Lancer/Ace editions.

- The Hour of the Dragon (Aug. 1977)
- The People of the Black Circle (Sep. 1977)
- Red Nails (Oct. 1977)

== Bantam series, 1978–1982 ==
A series of non-Howard material continuing and supplementing the Lancer/Ace series. Bantam numbered their volumes in order of intended publication, but volume 5 was actually issued after volume 6, and volume 7 was issued without numbering. Volumes 1-6 were later reissued by Ace Books in 1987 and 1991 and Tor Books from 2001 to 2002.

1. Conan the Swordsman (Aug. 1978) (by L. Sprague de Camp, Lin Carter, and Björn Nyberg)
2. Conan the Liberator (Feb. 1979) (by L. Sprague de Camp and Lin Carter)
3. Conan: The Sword of Skelos (May 1979) (by Andrew J. Offutt)
4. Conan: The Road of Kings (Oct. 1979) (by Karl Edward Wagner)
5. Conan and the Spider God (Dec. 1980) (by L. Sprague de Camp)
6. Conan the Rebel (Jul. 1980) (by Poul Anderson)
7. Conan the Barbarian (May 1982) (adaptation by L. Sprague de Camp and Lin Carter of the film of the same title)

== Sphere series ==
Reprints of the Lancer/Ace and Bantam editions (not including the film tie-in), as a single series.

== Ace Maroto series, 1978–1981 ==
A series of new material by Andrew J. Offutt and old Howard/de Camp collaborations, all illustrated by Esteban Maroto. The Offutt stories, in combination with his Conan: The Sword of Skelos from the Bantam series, form a linked trilogy.

- Conan and the Sorcerer (October 1978; by Andrew J. Offutt)
- The Treasure of Tranicos (July 1980; by Robert E. Howard and L. Sprague de Camp)
- Conan the Mercenary (January 1981; by Andrew J. Offutt)
- The Flame Knife (July 1981; by Robert E. Howard and L. Sprague de Camp)

== Tor series, 1982–2004 ==
A series of new stories by various hands; after a pause from 1998 to 2000, Tor also reissued most of the previous non-Howard volumes originally published by Bantam, followed by one more original novel; in addition, it published a few omnibus editions of previously published volumes at various times. The Tor editions were not published in chronological order, but skipped around to present random episodes from various points in Conan's career. Occasional chronological essays included in some of the earlier volumes (initially by L. Sprague de Camp and later by Robert Jordan) assisted readers in placing the episodes in their proper context; later volumes did not include such aids. De Camp provided chronological fixes for the first seven volumes (Conan the Invincible through Conan the Victorious), and Jordan for the first sixteen (Conan the Invincible through Conan the Valiant), with the odd exception of the eighth, Conan the Valorous. As both efforts also covered the earlier Lancer/Ace and Bantam Conan series, they also in effect provided fixes for the Bantams afterwards reissued by Tor (though they disagreed on the placement of three of these). Tor's listings in various volumes of books published in the series to date were in neither chronological nor publication order, but alphabetical by title.

=== Tor originals ===
- Conan the Invincible (Jun. 1982) (by Robert Jordan)
- Conan the Defender (Dec. 1982) (by Robert Jordan)
- Conan the Unconquered (Apr. 1983) (by Robert Jordan)
- Conan the Triumphant (Oct. 1983) (by Robert Jordan)
- Conan the Magnificent (May 1984) (by Robert Jordan)
- Conan the Destroyer (Jul. 1984) (adaptation by Robert Jordan of the movie of the same title)
- Conan the Victorious (Nov. 1984) (by Robert Jordan)
- Conan the Valorous (Sep. 1985) (by John M. Roberts)
- Conan the Fearless (Feb. 1986) (by Steve Perry)
- Conan the Renegade (Apr. 1986) (by Leonard Carpenter)
- Conan the Raider (Oct. 1986) (by Leonard Carpenter)
- Conan the Champion (Apr. 1987) (by John M. Roberts)
- Conan the Defiant (Oct. 1987) (by Steve Perry)
- Conan the Marauder (Jan. 1988) (by John M. Roberts)
- Conan the Warlord (Mar. 1988) (by Leonard Carpenter)
- Conan the Valiant (Oct. 1988) (by Roland Green)
- Conan the Hero (Feb. 1989) (by Leonard Carpenter)
- Conan the Bold (Apr. 1989) (by John M. Roberts)
- Conan the Great (Apr. 1989) (by Leonard Carpenter)
- Conan the Indomitable (Oct. 1989) (by Steve Perry)
- Conan the Free Lance (Feb. 1990) (by Steve Perry)
- Conan the Formidable (Nov. 1990) (by Steve Perry)
- Conan the Guardian (Jan. 1991) (by Roland Green)
- Conan the Outcast (Apr. 1991) (by Leonard Carpenter)
- Conan the Rogue (Nov. 1991) (by John M. Roberts)
- Conan the Relentless (Apr. 1992) (by Roland Green)
- Conan the Savage (Nov. 1992) (by Leonard Carpenter)
- Conan of the Red Brotherhood (Feb. 1993) (by Leonard Carpenter)
- Conan and the Gods of the Mountain (May 1993) (by Roland Green)
- Conan and the Treasure of Python (Nov. 1993) (by John M. Roberts)
- Conan the Hunter (Jan. 1994) (by Sean A. Moore) ISBN 0-8125-3531-6
- Conan, Scourge of the Bloody Coast (Apr. 1994) (by Leonard Carpenter)
- Conan and the Manhunters (Oct. 1994) (by John M. Roberts)
- Conan at the Demon's Gate (Nov. 1994) (by Roland Green)
- Conan the Gladiator (Jan. 1995) (by Leonard Carpenter)
- Conan and the Amazon (Apr. 1995) (by John M. Roberts)
- Conan and the Mists of Doom (Aug. 1995) (by Roland Green)
- Conan and the Emerald Lotus (Nov. 1995) (by John C. Hocking)
- Conan and the Shaman's Curse (Jan. 1996) (by Sean A. Moore)
- Conan, Lord of the Black River (Apr. 1996) (by Leonard Carpenter)
- Conan and the Grim Grey God (Nov. 1996) (by Sean A. Moore)
- Conan and the Death Lord of Thanza (Jan. 1997) (by Roland Green)
- Conan of Venarium (Jul. 2003) (by Harry Turtledove)

=== Tor reprints ===
- Conan: The Road of Kings (2001 - first published by Bantam, Oct. 1979) (by Karl Edward Wagner)
- Conan the Rebel (Oct. 2001 - first published by Bantam, Jul. 1980) (by Poul Anderson)
- Conan and the Spider God (2002 - first published by Bantam, Dec. 1980) (by L. Sprague de Camp)
- Conan: The Sword of Skelos (Feb. 2002 - first published by Bantam, May 1979) (by Andrew J. Offutt)
- Conan the Liberator (Jun. 2002 - first published by Bantam, Feb. 1979) (by L. Sprague de Camp and Lin Carter)
- Conan the Swordsman (Dec. 2002 - first published by Bantam, Aug. 1978) (by L. Sprague de Camp, Lin Carter, and Björn Nyberg)

=== Tor omnibuses ===
- The Conan Chronicles (Jul. 1995 omnibus of Conan the Invincible, Conan the Defender and Conan the Unconquered) (by Robert Jordan)
- The Further Chronicles of Conan (Oct. 1999 omnibus of Conan the Magnificent, Conan the Triumphant and Conan the Victorious) (by Robert Jordan)
- Sagas of Conan (Jan. 2004 omnibus of Conan the Swordsman, Conan the Liberator and Conan and the Spider God) (by L. Sprague de Camp, Lin Carter, and Björn Nyberg)

== Czecho-slovak series, 1992–2015 ==
In the wake of popularity of Conan books translations in early 90s some of the czech and slovak fantasy writers such as Vlado Ríša (using the pen name Richard D. Evans), Jan Šimůnek (Albert S. Pergill) or Juraj Červenák (Thorleif Larssen) also created their very own Conan adventures. These were usually published by small publishers such as Klub Julese Vernea or Návrat. A total of 39 original Czech novels about Conan the Barbarian were published between 1992 and 2015. None of them were yet translated to English. The titles of some of these are: Conan the Merciless (2000), Conan and the Shadows of Hyrth (1994), Conan and the Seven Days to the Full Moon (1993) or Conan and the Bloody Star (1992).

== Russian series, 1993–1996 ==
In the early 1990s the Russian publishers Troll and North-West (Severo-Zapad) hired local authors to write additional adventures of the Cimmerian. The authors took appropriately sounding pen names like Michael Manson, Douglas Brian, Duncan McGregor, and Paul Winlow (Nick Perumov), the titles, numbering at least 46 volumes, as of 2012 were not published outside Russia. The author Mikhail Akhmatov participated not only as author "Michael Manson", but also in working out the logistics of the project, so that Conan never appears in different places at the same time in the books of the various authors.

== Polish edition, 1992 ==
A Polish book about Conan by Jack de Craft, Conan: Pani Śmierć ("Conan: Lady Death" in English), was published in 1992 by the publisher Camelot. Jack de Craft is a pen name of Polish fantasy writer Jacek Piekara.

== Gollancz series, 2000–2006 ==
A new edition of Howard's original stories featuring a complete collection of only Howard's writings. Includes all the classic stories in their unrevised form; uncompleted or fragmentary tales have been left in that state. The two parts were put together in 2006 to form one stand alone Centenary Edition to celebrate the 100 years since the birth of Howard.

- The Conan Chronicles, 1 (Aug. 2000)
- The Conan Chronicles, 2 (2001)
- The Complete Chronicles of Conan (2006)

== Wandering Star/Del Rey series, 2003–2005 ==
A three volume collection of Howard's original stories, published by Wandering Star in the United Kingdom and Del Rey (a division of Random House) in the United States. These editions contain notes, rough drafts, and other miscellanea by Howard. Each volume is illustrated, by Mark Schultz, Gary Gianni, and Greg Manchess, respectively.

- Conan of Cimmeria: Volume One (1932–1933) (2003; vt The Coming of Conan the Cimmerian - US, 2003)
- Conan of Cimmeria: Volume Two (1934) (2004; vt The Bloody Crown of Conan - US, 2005)
- Conan of Cimmeria: Volume Three (1935–1936) (2005; vt The Conquering Sword of Conan - US, 2005)

== Age of Conan, 2005–2006 ==
Four trilogies have been released based on the MMORPG Age of Conan by Funcom. These do not directly involve Conan himself, but take place against the same background.

- Age of Conan: Anok, Heretic of Stygia
  - Scion of the Serpent (2005) (by J. Steven York)
  - Heretic of Set (2005) (by J. Steven York)
  - The Venom of Luxur (2005) (by J. Steven York)
- Age of Conan: Legends of Kern
  - Blood of Wolves (2005) (by Loren L. Coleman)
  - Cimmerian Rage (2005) (by Loren L. Coleman)
  - Songs of Victory (2005) (by Loren L. Coleman)
- Age of Conan: A Soldier's Quest
  - The God in the Moon (2006) (by Richard A. Knaak)
  - The Eye of Charon (2006) (by Richard A. Knaak)
  - The Silent Enemy (2006) (by Richard A. Knaak)
- Age of Conan: Marauders
  - Ghost of the Wall (2006) (by Jeff Mariotte)
  - Winds of the Wild (2006) (by Jeff Mariotte)
  - Dawn of the Ice Bear (2006) (by Jeff Mariotte)

== 2011 movie tie-ins ==
Both Del Rey Books and Berkley Books have issued Conan books as tie-ins with the 2011 remake of the 1982 Conan the Barbarian film.

- Conan the Barbarian (2011 collection) (2011) (by Robert E. Howard)
- Conan the Barbarian (2011 novel) (2011) (by Michael A. Stackpole)

== Chuck Dixon's Conan, 2023 ==
Published by Castalia House

- The Siege of the Black Citadel (Feb. 2023) (by Chuck Dixon)
- Caravan of the Damned (Oct. 2023) (by Chuck Dixon)

== Titan series, 2022– ==
Published by Titan Books, the Heroic Legends Series consists of short standalone stories (generally up to 80 pages) featuring Conan and other Robert E. Howard protagonists. In addition to this series, Titan also publishes full-length Conan novels expanding his adventures.

- The Heroic Legends Series:
  - Conan: Lord of the Mount (Sep. 2023) (by Stephen Graham Jones)
  - Conan: Black Starlight (Oct. 2023) (by John C. Hocking)
  - Solomon Kane: The Hound of God (Nov. 2023) (by Jonathan Maberry)
  - Conan: The Child (Dec. 2023) (by Brian D. Anderson)
  - Conan: The Shadow of Vengeance (Jan. 2024) (by Scott Oden)
  - Bêlit: Shipwrecked (Feb. 2024) (by V. Castro)
  - Bran Mak Morn: Red Waves of Slaughter (Mar. 2024) (by Steven L. Shrewsbury)
  - Conan: Lethal Consignment (Apr. 2024) (by Shaun Hamill)
  - Conan: Terror from the Abyss (May 2024) (by Henry Herz)
  - Solomon Kane: The Banquet of Souls (Jun. 2024) (by Steven Savile)
  - Bêlit: Bone Whispers (Jul. 2024) (by Michael A. Stackpole)
  - Conan: The Halls of Immortal Darkness (Aug. 2024) (by Laird Barron)
  - El Borak: The Siege of Lamakan (Sep. 2024) (by James Lovegrove)
  - Conan: Comrades (Sep. 2025) (by Brian D. Anderson)
  - Kull: The Talons of Deep Time (Oct. 2025) (by Francesco Dimitri)
  - Conan: The Amulet of Nakamar (Nov. 2025) (by Brendan Deneen)
  - Solomon Kane: The Lair of the Mari Lwyd (Dec. 2025) (by Shaun Hamill)
  - Conan: Marked for Death (Jan. 2026) (by Tim Waggoner)
  - Solomon Kane: Where the Whitethorn Meets the Black (Feb. 2026) (by Cavan Scott)
  - Conan: The Treasures of Tortage (Mar. 2026) (by Robbie MacNiven)
  - Kull: The Undoomed Man (Apr. 2026) (by Adam Rose)
  - Conan: The Green God of Leng (May 2026) (by Gavin G. Smith)
- Other Books:
  - Conan: Blood of the Serpent (Dec. 2022) (by S.M. Stirling)
  - Conan the Barbarian (Oct. 2023, reprint) (by L. Sprague de Camp and Lin Carter)
  - Conan: City of the Dead (Jun. 2024) (by John C. Hocking)
  - Conan: Cult of the Obsidian Moon (Nov. 2024) (by James Lovegrove)
  - Conan: Songs of the Slain (Jul. 2025) (by Tim Lebbon)
  - Conan: Spawn of the Serpent God (Oct. 2025) (by Tim Waggoner)
  - Solomon Kane: Suffer The Witch (Jan. 2026) (by Shaun Hamill)
  - Conan: Gold for Dark Gods (Nov. 2026) (by Jonathan French)
  - Conan: The Brides of Crom (Apr. 2027) (by John Langan)
