= Conan the Indomitable =

Book by Steve Perry

- Cover of first edition.
- Author: Steve Perry
- Cover artist: Kirk Reinert
- Language: English
- Series: Conan the Barbarian
- Genre: Sword and sorcery
- Publisher: Tor Books
- Publication date: 1989
- Publication place: United States
- Media type: Print (Paperback)
- Pages: 273
- ISBN: 0-8125-0295-7

Conan the Indomitable is a fantasy novel by American writer Steve Perry, featuring Robert E. Howard's sword and sorcery hero Conan the Barbarian. It was first published in trade paperback by Tor Books in October 1989; a regular paperback edition followed from the same publisher in September 1990.

== Plot ==
Conan and his companion, Elashi, find themselves pursued by pirates under the leadership of a hermaphroditic amalgamation of two lovers, who believe Conan's sword can separate the couple back into their original state. The two men soon discover a subterranean world, where a beautiful sorceress named Chuntha and Katamay Rey, an evil necromancer, struggle for control over various intelligent creatures. The bizarre cave-dwellers include blind white apes, vampire bats, web-spinning plants, one-eyed monsters, burrowing lizards, mole-like beasts, and giant earthworms. The local balance of power is threatened by Conan's arrival and various complications ensue, including a revolt by the enslaved creatures, before Conan can win his way back to the surface. One of the worms and a cyclops are featured sympathetically in a subplot.

== Chronology ==
Internal evidence indicates that Perry's earlier Conan work Conan the Defiant directly precedes this novel, though in the comprehensive Conan chronology of William Galen Gray, Sean A. Moore's Conan the Hunter is placed between the two books.

== Reception ==
Writing on one of Perry's other novels, reviewer Ryan Harvey assessed the author's Conan corpus as "goofy", noting that he "has a reputation among Conan fandom for overkill and general silliness."

Don D'Ammassa calls "Perry's third Conan pastiche ... rather out of the ordinary [with] [l]ots of chase scenes and more humor than is usual in sword and sorcery."

Preceded by Conan the Great	Tor Conan series (publication order)	Succeeded by Conan the Free Lance
Preceded by Conan the Hunter	Complete Conan Saga (William Galen Gray chronology)	Succeeded by Conan the Free Lance
