= Conan and the Mists of Doom =

Novel by Roland J. Green

Conan and The Mists of Doom
- Cover
- Author: Roland Green
- Cover artist: Keegan
- Language: English
- Series: Conan the Barbarian
- Genre: Sword and sorcery
- Publisher: Tor Books
- Publication date: 1995
- Publication place: United States
- Media type: Print (Paperback)
- Pages: 280
- ISBN: 0-812-52494-2

Conan and the Mists of Doom is a fantasy novel written by Roland Green featuring Robert E. Howard's sword and sorcery hero Conan the Barbarian. It was first published in paperback by Tor Books in August 1995.

== Plot synopsis ==
The story is set in the Kezankian Mountains and the borderlands of Turan. After Conan's time spent with the Afghulis begins to sour, he leads a band of tribesmen away from the Afghuli mountains and towards Koth. During their journey, the tribesmen are intercepted by a force of Turanian cavalry, led by Khezal, an old acquaintance of Conan's. Khezal offers Conan and his warriors freedom if they help combat the Mist of Doom, a life-draining force that is attacking Khezal's territory near the mountains. Unbeknownst to either Conan or Khezal, the Mist is controlled by the Lady of the Mists, who is gathering captives to feed to the Mist, in hopes of controlling it.

The Afghulis and Turanians meet up with a third group of desert nomads, the Ekinari, led by Bethina, an attractive young warrior woman. The three groups combine forces in an effort to defeat the Mist before it grows out of control. In the climactic battle, the Lady of the Mist is killed, but not before she can summon an elemental. The two magical forces collide, destroying the valley and each other. Conan's chief advisor, Farad, and Bethina stay in the valley to repopulate it while Conan rides on into Koth.

== Reception ==
Reviewer Ryan Harvey, commenting on Conan and the Death Lord of Thanza, another of Green's Conan novels, rates Conan and the Mists of Doom below it as the "worst Conan novel I've read," noting that he could "barely get through" it.

Don D'Ammassa, on the other hand, wrote "This was one of Green's better stories, quite an improvement over the previous one."

Preceded by Conan and the Amazon	Tor Conan series (publication order)	Succeeded by Conan and the Emerald Lotus
Preceded by Conan the Marauder	Complete Conan Saga (William Galen Gray chronology)	Succeeded by "The Slithering Shadow"
