= Conan of Venarium =

Novel by Harry Turtledove

- Cover of first edition
- Author: Harry Turtledove
- Cover artist: Julie Bell
- Language: English
- Series: Conan the Barbarian
- Genre: Sword and sorcery
- Publisher: Tor Books
- Publication date: 2003
- Publication place: United States
- Media type: Print (hardcover)
- Pages: 256
- ISBN: 0-7653-0466-X

Conan of Venarium is a fantasy novel by American writer Harry Turtledove, edited by Teresa Nielsen Hayden, featuring Robert E. Howard's sword and sorcery hero Conan the Barbarian. It was first published in hardcover by Tor Books in July 2003; a regular paperback edition followed from the same publisher in July 2004.

According to the table of contents the book includes a listing of "The Conan Novels in Chronological Order" at the end of the text; however, at least in the paperback edition, the list provided includes only Conan novels published by Tor and is not chronological, either in terms of content or publication.

== Plot ==
An Aquilonian army marches across the border of Bossonia into southern Cimmeria under the command of one Count Stercus. We soon learn that, although an able commander and warrior, Stercus has fallen from favour with King Numedides for his lecherous ways involving adolescents back in Aquilonia. His banishment to the frontier is, apparently, part of his penance.

Word of the invasion passes through Cimmeria as the army continues to press north, building forts each evening where they camp. Eventually Stercus is satisfied with his advance and calls a halt.

The last fort constructed is called Venarium.

We are introduced to a 12-year-old boy named Conan, living with his family in a village called Duthil, located north of Venarium, about a day's travel by foot. Conan's family consists of his father, Mordec the blacksmith and his mother, Verina. Conan's mother has been sick for as long as Conan can remember with tuberculosis.

Duthil is a good sized village, sporting a smith, a miller, a weaver, a tanner and other cottage industry. A number of farmers and herdsmen use Duthil as a hub for commerce and a source of additional labour at harvest. At least 2 homes in Duthil have more than one room.

Word of the invasion soon reaches Duthil. Mordec and Balarg, the two leading Elders, determine how to best continue spreading the word to other villages. We also hear, at this time, that Conan bears more than a passing affection for Balarg's daughter, Tarla, who is near his age.

Before long, the men of a handful of Clans are gathering to repel the invading Aquilonians. Mordec readies himself to join them. He and Conan come to blows over Conan's insistence that he is old enough to join in the battle.

The Clans surround the fort and mount a fierce attack but are scattered by a charge of Aquilonian cavalry as they are about to breach the gate. The Cimmerians break and run, many of them being ridden down and killed. A number of men from Duthil survive with various wounds. Mordec, one of the last Cimmerians to leave the battle, is the last villager from Duthil to return home. He and his Clansmen resignedly accept that, for the time being, they must live as conquered subjects of Aquilonia.

A squad of Aquilonian soldiers soon arrives at Duthil commanded by a Captain Treviranus. Mordec translates the Captain's decrees into Cimmerian. He will treat the Cimmerians fairly but informs them that every Aquilonian harmed by a Cimmerian will result in ten Cimmerians being harmed in return. Treviraus even goes so far as to warn them to ward their youth against the impure interests of Count Stercus, his commander in Venarium. The squad constructs a small walled compound a stone's throw from the village as a garrison.

Settlers begin arriving shortly thereafter and establish homesteads in the country around Venarium and south to the Bossonian border.

We see Conan grow up under the shackles of his youth, his domestic situation, and the enmity he bears the occupying soldiers and settlers.

The occupation lasts approximately two years.

That summer, two score Cimmerian Clans rise against the invaders and the horde sweeps south, utterly destroying Venarium, driving the last surviving settlers and the remnants of the defeated Aquilonian army ahead of them into Bossonia. A number of Cimmerians cross into Bossonia to teach the Aquilonians a hard lesson about ever considering another invasion. More than one band pushes south through Bossonia, raiding into Gunderland. Conan's raiding party even pushes far enough south to enter Aquilonia itself, but is wiped out, soon thereafter, to a single man; Conan is the sole survivor.

Continuing south through Aquilonia, intent on travelling to the capital, Tarantia, Conan takes a contract as a teamster, despite never having driven a horse and wagon. He delivers the wagon load of onions, as promised, and then steals the wagon to head south and east toward other Hyborian lands.

Conan is 14 years old at the end of the story.

== Reception ==
Roland Green of Booklist, himself an author of earlier Conan novels, wrote "Among Conan's many limners, Turtledove distinguishes himself with an unmatched portrait of Cimmerian society and a fine, intelligent characterization of the young barbarian."

Jackie Cassada of the Library Journal called the book "[a] good addition to libraries' Conan novels."

Publishers Weekly wrote "Turtledove ... attempts to inject some life into the well-trod Conan sequel subgenre, but this coming-of-age story of Robert E. Howard's barbarian hero is, alas, just as commonplace as all the other imitations by the late Lin Carter and company. ... The fantasy elements are disappointingly few ... Only Conan diehards and Turtledove completists will be likely to pick up this sword-with-little-sorcery novel."

Kirkus Reviews noted merely that "Turtledove opens on familiar gritty prehistoric territory" and that the book had a "[l]ocked-in audience."

Don D'Ammassa calls this novel, "Turtledove's only Conan pastiche," "much more focused than the author's sprawling alternate history stories and the result is a fast-paced and quite good barbarian fantasy that does a better than average job of capturing the atmosphere of Howard's original series." He notes that "Conan's youth in Cimmeria has been chronicled a couple of times before, though briefly and with contradictions. This is a much longer version but it also contradicts the others." He also observes that "Turtledove'[s] Conan is more nuanced but also more hotheaded."

Preceded by Conan and the Death Lord of Thanza	Tor Conan series (publication order)	Succeeded by none
Preceded by Conan the Barbarian (2011 novel) (Part 1)	Complete Conan Saga (William Galen Gray chronology)	Succeeded by "Legions of the Dead"
