= Conan and the Manhunters =

Book by John Maddox Roberts

- Cover of first edition
- Author: John Maddox Roberts
- Cover artist: Ken Kelly
- Language: English
- Series: Conan the Barbarian
- Genre: Sword and sorcery
- Publisher: Tor Books
- Publication date: 1994
- Publication place: United States
- Media type: Print (paperback)
- Pages: 276
- ISBN: 0-8125-2489-6

Conan and the Manhunters is a fantasy novel by American writer John Maddox Roberts, featuring Robert E. Howard's sword and sorcery hero Conan the Barbarian. It was first published in paperback by Tor Books in October 1994, and was reprinted in April and June 1999.

== Plot ==
Conan, imprisoned by a satrap named Torgat Khan, escapes and is reunited with a band of thieves he had been leading in the deserts southwest of Turan. Subsequently, the thieves plan on looting the Khan's treasury, held in a vault beneath the newly built temple of the sinister cult of Ahriman, the priests of which hope to revive their ancient god.

Persuaded that mystical aid will be needed to ensure success, Conan agrees on accepting the aid of a kind wizard named Volvolicus and his daughter, Layla. After stealing the Khan's treasure, Conan is pursued by the Manhunters, a band of bounty hunters with specialized skills led by a captain even more powerful than Conan himself. Through his own skills, and those of his new allies, Conan thwarts his pursuers while preventing the resurrection of Ahriman.

== Reception ==
Don D'Ammassa, writing of Roberts' Conan novels, noted that "[a]lthough Roberts did not recreate Howard's character exactly, making him more intellectual and less inclined to solve every problem by hitting it with a sword, his evocation of the barbaric setting is superior to that of most of the other writers contributing to the series." This novel, D'Ammassa writes, "was an excellent pastiche with some well drawn characters and exciting situations" in which "Conan wins ... through brains as much as brawn."

Writing of some other Tor Conan novels, reviewer Ryan Harvey called Roberts "the most consistently successful of its stable of authors," and "the most consistently entertaining" of them, showing "deft ability with storytelling and action scenes, and a thankful tendency not to overplay his hand and try to ape Robert E. Howard’s style."

Preceded by Conan, Scourge of the Bloody Coast	Tor Conan series (publication order)	Succeeded by Conan at the Demon's Gate
Preceded by "Black Tears"	Complete Conan Saga (William Galen Gray chronology)	Succeeded by "Shadows in Zamboula"
