= Jangar (disambiguation) =

Jangar, Djangar, Dzhangar may refer to:

- The Jangar Epic and its hero
- Dzhangar (settlement), settlement in Kalmykia, Russia
- 2756 Dzhangar, minor planet
- Jangar, a fictional ancient city in Conan and the Amazon
- "Jangar", 2020 album by Mongolian ensemble Khusugtun
