= Conan the Gladiator =

Novel by Leonard Carpenter

- Cover of first edition
- Author: Leonard Carpenter
- Cover artist: Ken Kelly
- Language: English
- Series: Conan the Barbarian
- Genre: Sword and sorcery
- Publisher: Tor Books
- Publication date: 1995
- Publication place: United States
- Media type: Print (Paperback)
- Pages: 278
- ISBN: 0-812-52492-6

Conan the Gladiator is a fantasy novel by American writer Leonard Carpenter, featuring Robert E. Howard's sword and sorcery hero Conan the Barbarian. It was first published in paperback by Tor Books in January 1995 and was reprinted in August 1999. Carpenter dedicated the book to L. Sprague de Camp.

== Plot ==
In the city of Thujara in Shem, Conan becomes involved in a street brawl and injures Roganthus, the strong man of a traveling circus troupe. A combination of regret over the troupe's loss and attraction for another member, the beautiful panther-trainer Sathilda, leads Conan to offer his own services as a stand-in for Roganthus. Joining the troupe, he accompanies them first to the town of Senjaj and then across the river Styx to Stygia, where they hope to become wealthy performing in the capital of Luxur. Stygia is usually depicted as a realm of decadent evil, crawling with sinister priests and sorcerers; in this novel, however, the local priests of Set are portrayed more as a fraternity of knowledge-seekers. Luxur is ruled by a tyrannical emperor, Commodorus, who forces Conan's troupe to fight for their lives in his arena against exotic warriors and wild beasts. Conan is disturbed at having to kill opponents with whom he feels some affinity, such as rebel Stygians and the Kushite Muzudaya. Soon, he's temporarily converted by a priest and fellow captive into an uncharacteristic pacifist. Exercising his military knowledge, he forms his fellow gladiators into a defensive phalanx at one point. The plot, seemingly building to a climactic final battle, is instead resolved by a catastrophic natural disaster, in the course of which Commodorus meets a fitting fate and much of Luxur is devastated. Everyone in Conan's troupe escapes from Luxur with the aid of a rebellious priest. In the wake of this event, Conan returns to Shem seeing different employment.

== Reception ==
Critic Don D'Ammassa writes "The closing chapters are quite good but there are some dull sections beforehand."

Preceded by Conan at the Demon's Gate	Tor Conan series (publication order)	Succeeded by Conan and the Amazon
Preceded by Conan the Barbarian (2011 novel) (Part 2)	Complete Conan Saga (William Galen Gray chronology)	Succeeded by Conan and the Emerald Lotus
