= Conan and the Shaman's Curse =

Book by Sean A. Moore

- Cover of first edition
- Author: Sean A. Moore
- Cover artist: Ken Kelly
- Language: English
- Series: Conan the Barbarian
- Genre: Sword and sorcery
- Publisher: Tor Books
- Publication date: 1996
- Publication place: United States
- Media type: Print (Paperback)
- Pages: 244
- ISBN: 0-8125-5265-2

Conan and the Shaman's Curse is a fantasy novel by American writer Sean A. Moore, featuring Robert E. Howard's sword and sorcery hero Conan the Barbarian. It was first published in paperback by Tor Books in January 1996.

== Plot ==
At the end of a battle in which both forces are nearly wiped out, Conan slays the last member of the enemy host, a shaman whose dying curse turns the Cimmerian into a killer were-ape when the moon is full. Subsequent misfortunes include a battle with huge vultures and getting marooned on an island inhabited by a lost race of giants, all apparent consequences of his curse. Eventually, he finds another magician able to lift it.

== Reception ==
Reviewer Don D'Ammassa calls the book "the weakest of Moore's three Conan pastiches although it has some good bits scattered throughout."

== Notes ==
Preceded by Conan and the Emerald Lotus	Tor Conan series (publication order)	Succeeded by Conan, Lord of the Black River
Preceded by "The Flame Knife"	Complete Conan Saga (William Galen Gray chronology)	Succeeded by "The People of the Black Circle"
