= Conan the Raider =

Novel by Leonard Carpenter

- Cover of first edition
- Author: Leonard Carpenter
- Language: English
- Series: Conan the Barbarian
- Genre: Sword and sorcery
- Publisher: Tor Books
- Publication date: 1986
- Publication place: United States
- Media type: Print (Paperback)
- Pages: 276
- ISBN: 0-8125-4256-8

Conan the Raider is a fantasy novel by American writer Leonard Carpenter, featuring Robert E. Howard's sword and sorcery hero Conan the Barbarian. It was first published in paperback by Tor Books in October 1986. It was reprinted by Tor in September 1987.

== Plot ==
In the deserts of Shem, Conan tracks a thief who stole from him a jewel known as the Star of Khorala. He finds the man, but his gem is missing. Eventually, Conan is saved from death by dehydration during an encounter with the caravan of Otsgar the Vanir, into which he is welcomed due to his previous acquaintance with Isaiab, a Shemite he had known in Arenjun. Otsgar's party turns out to be a band of tomb raiders, though their expedition proves disappointing, even with Conan's aid. Ostgar gains little, while death traps and tomb guardians with the heads of crocodiles combine to dispatch everyone except Conan, Otsgar, Isaiab, and two survivors; the Stygian woman, Zafriti, and a Shemitish rebel, Asrafel.

The thieves eventually regroup in Abaddrah, Isaib's hometown, a city-state on the River Styx, bordering Stygia. The king, Ebnezub, is having a great tomb constructed for himself on the advice an exiled prophet named Horaspes. Ebnezub is likely to need it soon, as his wife, Nitokar, has been poisoning him. The thieves hope to plunder Eznezub's tomb and the ancient catacombs beneath Abaddrah. Conan investigates the catacombs between encounters with Zafriti and Princess Afrit. Soon, Conan wanders into a gladiatorial arena where he must fight against a shaman armed with snakes.

The situation escalates when the villainous Horaspes reveals his true scheme, and an army of undead warriors lay siege to Abaddrah. After a great battle, Conan defeats Horaspes with the very jewel he sought in the first place.

== Reception ==
Reviewer Ryan Harvey considered the novel "the best Leonard Carpenter entry in the series I've yet read," writing that "it starts weakly and episodically, but slaps together a busy and exciting conclusion." He felt it "heads into Indiana Jones territory, and is basically an Egyptian tomb-robbing adventure in a fantasy setting." Despite "the derivative tomb-robbing plot [i]t has a touch more horror to it than other pastiches, and I always appreciate a pastiche writer willing to dig down into the more horrific side of the Weird Tales legacy."

Reviewer Don D'Ammassa noted "This was a significant improvement over Carpenter's first novel, dropping the clunky artificial dialogue and expanding to a fairly large number of reasonably well developed characters, three of whom are women."

Preceded by Conan the Renegade	Tor Conan series (publication order)	Succeeded by Conan the Champion
Preceded by "Shadows in Zamboula"	Complete Conan Saga (William Galen Gray chronology)	Succeeded by "The Star of Khorala"
