= Conan the Relentless =

Novel by Roland J. Green

- cover of Conan the Relentless
- Author: Roland Green
- Cover artist: Ken Kelly
- Language: English
- Series: Conan the Barbarian
- Genre: Sword and sorcery
- Publisher: Tor Books
- Publication date: 1992
- Publication place: United States
- Media type: Print (Paperback)
- Pages: 279
- ISBN: 0-812-50962-5
- OCLC: 25533769

Conan the Relentless is a fantasy novel by American writer Roland Green featuring Robert E. Howard's sword and sorcery hero Conan the Barbarian. It was first published in paperback by Tor Books in April 1992, and was reprinted in April 1998.

== Plot ==
After the events of "The Lair of the Ice Worm", Conan enters the Border Kingdom. Encountering a group of bandits, he learns that the guards of a caravan they plan to raid are led by Raihna, a female adventurer he had previously encountered in Conan the Valiant. This news leads him to abandon his inclination in joining the bandits and come to the aid of Raihna, instead. Afterwards, the duo enter the service of Eloikis, theoretical king over the restive and semi-independent lords of the country, who needs their aid against a powerful count and two demon-controlling wizards. The story follows their adventures as Eloikis' troubleshooters, which ultimately concludes with their rescue of both his daughter and grandson. But their partnership dissolves when Rhiana decides to marry one of the king's guards, and Conan resumes his wanderings, heading south.

== Reception ==
Don D'Ammassa called the book "Standard Conan fare done with a strong interest in background detail."

| Preceded by Conan the Rogue | Tor Conan series (publication order) | Succeeded by Conan the Savage |
| Preceded by "The Lair of the Ice Worm" | Complete Conan Saga (William Galen Gray chronology) | Succeeded by Conan the Savage |
