= Conan the Bold =

Book by John Maddox Roberts

- Cover of the first edition.
- Author: John Maddox Roberts
- Cover artist: Ken Kelly
- Language: English
- Series: Conan the Barbarian
- Genre: Sword and sorcery
- Publisher: Tor Books
- Publication date: 1989
- Publication place: United States
- Media type: Print (paperback)
- Pages: 282
- ISBN: 0-8125-5210-5

Conan the Bold is a fantasy novel by American writer John Maddox Roberts, featuring Robert E. Howard's sword and sorcery hero Conan the Barbarian. It was first published in paperback by Tor Books in April 1989, and was reprinted in June 1997.

== Plot ==
A young Conan's prospects for a domestic existence are destroyed, along with his intended fiancé, by the renegade Taharka of Keshan. To achieve vengeance, the Cimmerian joins forces with a one-eyed warrior woman, Mad Kalya, also wronged by Taharka's outlaws. The couple pursue their enemies across several nations, from Croton's fighting pits to the Ophirian plains, overtaking them in time and again only to see Taharka slip through their fingers. The chase ultimately culminates in a battle to the death.

== Reception ==
Don D'Ammassa, writing of Roberts' Conan novels, noted that "[a]lthough Roberts did not recreate Howard's character exactly, making him more intellectual and less inclined to solve every problem by hitting it with a sword, his evocation of the barbaric setting is superior to that of most of the other writers contributing to the series." He calls this novel "very enjoyable" and "one of the most interesting of the Conan pastiches because it avoids many of the usual clichés."

Writing of some other Tor Conan novels, reviewer Ryan Harvey called Roberts "the most consistently successful of its stable of authors," and "the most consistently entertaining" of them, showing "deft ability with storytelling and action scenes, and a thankful tendency not to overplay his hand and try to ape Robert E. Howard's style."

Preceded by Conan the Hero	Tor Conan series (publication order)	Succeeded by Conan the Great
