= Conan of the Red Brotherhood =

Novel by Leonard Carpenter

- cover of Conan of the Red Brotherhood
- Author: Leonard Carpenter
- Cover artist: Ken Kelly
- Language: English
- Series: Conan the Barbarian
- Genre: Sword and sorcery
- Publisher: Tor Books
- Publication date: 1993
- Publication place: United States
- Media type: Print (Paperback)
- Pages: 277
- ISBN: 0-812-51413-0

Conan of the Red Brotherhood is a fantasy novel by American writer Leonard Carpenter featuring Robert E. Howard's sword and sorcery hero Conan the Barbarian. It was first published in paperback by Tor Books in February 1993, and reprinted in 1998.

== Plot ==
From a fortress on the island of Djafur, Conan (using his alias as Amra the Lion) builds the piratical Red Brotherhood into a virtual naval empire on the Vilayet Sea. In one raid, Conan accidentally rescues Philiope, a nobleman's daughter, who in time threatens his romantic interests towards Olivia (a holdover from the previous story, "Shadows in the Moonlight"). However, Amra's activities present a major challenge for the region's dominant power, the empire of Turan. In the capital of Aghrapur, Emperor Yildiz, his son Yezdigerd, and their underlings plan on destroying his forces. Their wizards come up with various obstacles including a steam engine, zombie-crewed ships, centipede-like creatures, and a huge monster from the depths of the sea. Conan, however, emerges triumphant with each encounter.

== Reception ==
Reviewer Don D'Ammassa rates the novel as "[s]lightly above average for the author."

Preceded by Conan the Savage	Tor Conan series (publication order)	Succeeded by Conan and the Gods of the Mountain
Preceded by "Shadows in the Moonlight"	Complete Conan Saga (William Galen Gray chronology)	Succeeded by Conan, Scourge of the Bloody Coast
