= Conan the Guardian =

Novel by Roland J. Green

- Cover of first edition
- Author: Roland Green
- Cover artist: Ken Kelly
- Language: English
- Series: Conan the Barbarian
- Genre: Sword and sorcery
- Published: 1991
- Publisher: Tor Books
- Publication place: United States
- Media type: Print Paperback
- Pages: 280
- ISBN: 0-8125-0961-7

Conan the Guardian is a fantasy novel by American writer Roland Green, featuring Robert E. Howard's sword and sorcery hero Conan the Barbarian. It was first published in paperback by Tor Books in January 1991, and reprinted in October 1997 and August 2000.

== Plot ==
Conan and other former mercenaries take employment as bodyguards for Lady Livia, head of one of the ruling merchant houses of Argos. Livia is threatened by a rival seeking to gain personal control of all Argos, who is secretly backed by a sorcerer.

== Reception ==
Writing of this novel, reviewer Don D'Ammassa noted that "Green's Conan is a good deal more sophisticated, even as a young man, than he is portrayed in most of the books by other authors."

Preceded by Conan the Formidable	Tor Conan series (publication order)	Succeeded by Conan the Outcast
Preceded by Conan the Triumphant	Complete Conan Saga (William Galen Gray chronology)	Succeeded by "Queen of the Black Coast"
