= Conan the Savage =

Novel by Leonard Carpenter

- Cover
- Author: Leonard Carpenter
- Cover artist: Ken Kelly
- Language: English
- Series: Conan the Barbarian
- Genre: Sword and sorcery
- Publisher: Tor
- Publication date: 1992
- Publication place: United States
- Media type: Print (Paperback)
- Pages: 280
- ISBN: 0-8125-1412-2

Conan the Savage is a fantasy novel by American writer Leonard Carpenter featuring Robert E. Howard's sword and sorcery hero Conan the Barbarian. It was first published in trade paperback by Tor Books in November 1992; a regular paperback edition followed from the same publisher in August 1993, and was reprinted in March 1999.

== Plot synopsis ==
The novel follows two parallel storylines. In the first, Conan is sent to a Brythunian prison mine after he accused his gambling opponent of cheating. Escaping via an underground river, he ends up in a wild region, where he is badly injured in his fight with a bear. He is nursed back to health by Songa, a woman from a local tribe, with whom he eventually settles. Conan finds her tribe's culture and way of life as simplicity rewarding. However, his idyllic life is disrupted when Brythunian soldiers, under orders to locate a magic jewel in possession of the tribe, attack and destroy their village.

The other narrative is the life-story of a sorceress named Tamsin, who, as a child, watched in horror as her mother is raped and killed by mercenaries in the service of Typhas, the king of Brythunia. Tamsin seeks vengeance after she and her doll begin manifesting disturbing magical powers; the doll being possessed by Ninga, a minor deity. Tamsin challenges the kingdom's main cult, in time establishing Ninga's in its place, murders King Typhas, and becomes queen of Brythunia herself. As the fate of Songa's tribe assets, Tamsin's rule proves she is just as corrupt and evil as that of her predecessor.

The two plot threads converge when Conan shows up in Brythunia's capital seeking vengeance. He battles Tamsin, eventually destroying her doll and its powers.

== Chronological notes ==
There is no specific age given in Conan the Savage. There is a reference to Conan's time spent with raiding with the Vanir.

== Reception ==
Don D'Ammassa, also observing that "Conan is only present in about half of this novel," notes that while there are "[s]ome goods [sic] parts sprinkled through, ... this [book] doesn't hold together very well."

| Preceded by Conan the Relentless | Tor Conan series (publication order) | Succeeded by Conan of the Red Brotherhood |
| Preceded by Conan the Relentless | Complete Conan Saga (William Galen Gray chronology) | Succeeded by Conan the Defender |
