= Conan, Scourge of the Bloody Coast =

Novel by Leonard Carpenter

- Cover of the first edition
- Author: Leonard Carpenter
- Cover artist: Ken Kelly
- Language: English
- Series: Conan the Barbarian
- Genre: Sword and sorcery
- Publisher: Tor Books
- Publication date: 1994
- Publication place: United States
- Media type: Print (Paperback)
- Pages: 244
- ISBN: 0-8125-2488-8

Conan, Scourge of the Bloody Coast is a fantasy novel by American writer Leonard Carpenter featuring Robert E. Howard's sword and sorcery hero Conan the Barbarian. It was first published in paperback by Tor Books in April 1994.

== Plot ==
Conan, under his piratical alias of Amra, continues in developing a pirate empire in the Vilayet Sea. Operating from the rebuilt city of Djafur, located on one of the islands in the Aetolian Archipelago, Conan tricks the Turanian Empire of King Yildiz into a war against the Hyrkanians. Joining forces with a necromancer, Crotalis, Conan and his pirates participate in looting the lost city of Sarpedon. However, Crotalis betrays the pirates, forcing Conan to run his vessel ashore, where he's captured by a tribe of Hyrkanian nomads. Fortunately, Conan is released after he proves his value as a warrior. In return for his release, Conan agrees to support the Hyrkanians in their naval invasion of Turan.

Crotalis also offers his services to the Hyrkanians, leading to another rogues' alliance with Conan. Using a magical wind summoned by Crotalis, the Hyrkanian fleet moves to attack the Turanians. After their lengthy nautical battle ends in a stalemate, Crotalis re-animates the corpses of all the pirates' former victims, forcing Conan into battle with an undead army. Suddenly, before Crotalis could claim his final victory, he is burned alive. Soon, the battle leaves the navies of both kingdoms in a weakened state, and Conan's Red Brotherhood becomes the strongest fleet in the Vilayet Sea.

== Reception ==
Reviewer Bob Byrne writes "Overall, I thought it was an okay book. One I didn’t mind reading but not one I expect to read again." He feels the story "largely consists of two parts: an extended undersea excavation and a big naval battle. Everything else is pretty much filler. There’s not a whole lot to this novel, and if you don’t buy into the 'Conan as king of a pirate city' thing, you aren't going to put this in the keeper pile." The climactic battle he considers "interesting, though I thought that the end of it was a bit weak." In regard to the writing he feels "some of Carpenter’s description evinces a nice writing style, such as scenes where the ships are at sea. Other parts, however, do not." Citing dialog between Conan and his mistress, he notes "I might have thought that clever as a teenager, but I’m not sure even then." He rates the book "pretty tame on the Conan sex scale, with the wenches who get angry at him always falling back into his arms," and regards Conan as "awfully forgiving to someone who betrays him, costing him a fortune and leaving [him] to escape a near certain death." His conclusion: "If you like Conan as a reaver/corsair/pirate instead of a land-based barbarian, you should probably give this one a read."

Don D'Ammassa writes "I generally enjoy pirate stories but there was not a lot of that despite the title. There's a pretty good sea battle and some other effective scenes, but the ending feels rushed."

Preceded by Conan the Hunter	Tor Conan series (publication order)	Succeeded by Conan and the Manhunters
Preceded by Conan of the Red Brotherhood	Complete Conan Saga (William Galen Gray chronology)	Succeeded by Conan the Champion
