= Conan the Hunter =

Book by Sean A. Moore

- Cover of the first edition.
- Author: Sean A. Moore
- Cover artist: Ken W. Kelly
- Language: English
- Series: Conan the Barbarian
- Genre: Sword and sorcery
- Publisher: Tor Books
- Publication date: 1994
- Publication place: United States
- Media type: Print (Paperback)
- Pages: 245
- ISBN: 0-8125-3531-6

Conan the Hunter is a fantasy novel by American writer Sean A. Moore, featuring Robert E. Howard's sword and sorcery hero Conan the Barbarian. It was first published in paperback by Tor Books in January 1994.

== Plot ==
After facing a sewer monster, Conan is enlisted against a demon sorceress's conspiracy in restoring the wealth of her ancient race. In their struggle against Valtresca and Azora, the Cimmerian and his allies Salvorus, Kailash the hillman, and a young priest, Madesus, encounter numerous traps and divine intervention in an adventure culminating in a ruined temple with legions of gargoyles and the resurrection of the horrific villain Skauraul.

== Reception ==
Reviewer Ryan Harvey's assessment of this novel, Moore's first, praises the author for his "strengths ... in crafting a clever, dense plot with immense, epic scope, and populating it with an imaginative flood of action and monsters." Harvey also criticizes him for "two tremendous flaws; first, "overwrit[ing] to an incredible degree" and second, a structure that is "choppy and ... start-and-stop ... mak[ing] it difficult to keep up continual interest in the plot." But the book "does have some delicious moments where you can almost forget the overall problems"

Don D'Ammassa writes "Although this first novel is yet another variation of the same theme – a sorcerer assists some traitors in an effort to usurp a throne – there are some nice touches here and there and the prose is quite good. It's a shame we never had a chance to see any original material by Moore."

Preceded by Conan and the Treasure of Python	Tor Conan series (publication order)	Succeeded by Conan, Scourge of the Bloody Coast
Preceded by Conan the Defiant	Complete Conan Saga (William Galen Gray chronology)	Succeeded by Conan the Indomitable
