= Conan the Rogue =

Book by John Maddox Roberts

- Cover
- Author: John Maddox Roberts
- Cover artist: Ken Kelly
- Language: English
- Series: Conan the Barbarian
- Genre: Sword and sorcery
- Publisher: Tor Books
- Publication date: 1991
- Publication place: United States
- Media type: Print (paperback)
- Pages: 304
- ISBN: 0-8125-1411-4

Conan the Rogue is a fantasy novel by American writer John Maddox Roberts, featuring Robert E. Howard's sword and sorcery hero Conan the Barbarian. It was first published in trade paperback by Tor Books in November 1991; a regular paperback edition followed from the same publisher in August 1992, and was reprinted in January 1999.

== Plot ==
After quelling a revolt in Nemedia, Conan loses everything except for his sword while gambling at a tavern. A man follows Conan out of the tavern, before hiring him to obtain a mysterious and valuable relic. Outfitting himself with the initial payment, Conan travels towards the city of Sicas in Aquilonia. Once renowned for its silver mines but now a den of iniquity, more travelers are said to leave Sicas "by the river, floating" than through the gates. Along the way, he rescues a woman searching for her missing sister, said to have gone into the same city.

Sicas turns out to be in the midst of a conflict between numerous contenders for control, most notably the king's corrupt servants, five different gangs, and a religious cult. Conan feels right at home, and plunges into the struggle. Various intrigues and betrayals follow in rapid succession, centering on the object he has been commissioned to recover, which is revealed to be a potent magical artifact. The rising tension in Sicas results in an all-out major brawl near the middle of town square, between local gangs and various power players. In contrast to most of the players, Conan emerges from Sicas ahead of the game, passing by royal forces en route to restore order in the city. When questioned as to how he did it, he responds: "That was a town of rogues, my friend, and I am the greatest rogue of all."

At the end, with some new comrades, Conan travels into Tarantia as he hears news of a civil war brewing in Aquilonia.

== Reception ==
Don D'Ammassa, writing of Roberts' Conan novels, noted that "[a]lthough Roberts did not recreate Howard's character exactly, making him more intellectual and less inclined to solve every problem by hitting it with a sword, his evocation of the barbaric setting is superior to that of most of the other writers contributing to the series. Conan the Marauder (1987) and Conan the Rogue (1991) are the best of the set." Of this novel he writes "[t]he plot is a conscious mashup of The Maltese Falcon and A Fistful of Dollars" that "works out ... in an amusing and interesting manner.."

Writing of some other Tor Conan novels, reviewer Harvey Ryan called Roberts "the most consistently successful of its stable of authors," and "the most consistently entertaining" of them, showing "deft ability with storytelling and action scenes, and a thankful tendency not to overplay his hand and try to ape Robert E. Howard's style."

Preceded by Conan the Outcast	Tor Conan series (publication order)	Succeeded by Conan the Relentless
Preceded by Conan, Lord of the Black River	Complete Conan Saga (William Galen Gray chronology)	Succeeded by "Beyond the Black River"
