= Conan the Outcast =

Novel by Leonard Carpenter

- Cover of Conan the Outcast by Leonard Carpenter
- Author: Leonard Carpenter
- Cover artist: Ken Kelly
- Language: English
- Series: Conan the Barbarian
- Genre: Sword and sorcery
- Publisher: Tor Books
- Publication date: 1991
- Publication place: United States
- Media type: Print (paperback)
- Pages: 274
- ISBN: 0-8125-0928-5

Conan the Outcast is a fantasy novel by American author Leonard Carpenter, featuring Robert E. Howard's sword and sorcery hero Conan the Barbarian. It was first published in April 1991 in paperback by Tor Books, and was reprinted in February 1998.

== Plot ==
King Anaximander of Sark calls in his high priest, Khumanos, to talk about a drought ravaging their city. After the ritual sacrifice of many high priests, Anaximander decides that a larger offering to their god, Voltantha, is required. He directs Khumanos to sacrifice Qjara, a more prosperous city to the north.

To do this correctly, Khumanos seeks out Solon in the desert, to which he expresses doubts about the mission. Solon sees Khumanos' compassion as a weakness and shows him the "Sword of Onothimanos", which is just a rusted blade. Soon, Khumanos becomes emotionless and devoted to the mission, so much so that he kills Solon because he outlived his usefulness.

Conan is on the outskirts of Qjara, awaiting a caravan into Shadizar. He is invited into the caravan sector of Ojara by some local children. He settles down in a bar and meets Afriandra in disguise. She proves her precognitive ability by correctly predicting the death of a nearby patron. When Zaius comes to the bar looking for her, Conan provides a distraction by taunting him. Zaius says he is not worth the effort.

Conan begins a romantic relationship with Afrianda, which offends Zaius. The two men have a quick fistfight where Conan is winning, which Afrianda implores him to stop. Conan demands a formal duel, which Zaius rejects on the basis of Conan not being a citizen. After Conan defends Qjara's gates from a nomad attack, he becomes an honorary citizen and uses the opportunity to challenge Zaius to ritual combat. Zaius accepts his offer.

Meanwhile, King Anaximander begins a diplomatic mission to Qjara. He witnesses proof of what he thinks of as Qjara's debauchery, and asks the king and queen for permission to set up a temple of Voltantha in their city. They go one better, proposing a "marriage" between the goddess Saditha and Voltantha. The deal is done, and Khumanos begins his work.

Khumanos orders slaves to mine three veins of glowing green ore from the Sarkian Mountains. Extended exposure to this substance causes sores, illness, and even death. Keeping the stones of the three veins separate, the slaves refine it into three separate statues which are hoisted on to carts and sent by three different routes to Qjara, avoiding populated areas before traveling through the wastelands. Despite the heat and hard labor, Khumanos insists the carts be driven by human labor with limited breaks.

In Qjara, Conan prepares for his duel. Zaius preens and postures for the crowd, angering Conan. When the duel begins, Zaius' first stroke cuts off his own head. Not recognizing this as a ritual suicide, Conan begins ridiculing Zaius for backing away from the fight. This angers the royalty and forces them to cast him out of the city.

== Reception ==
Don D'Ammassa calls the book a "[f]airly good adventure".

Preceded by Conan the Guardian	Tor Conan series (publication order)	Succeeded by Conan the Rogue
Preceded by The Sword of Skelos	Complete Conan Saga (William Galen Gray chronology)	Succeeded by Conan the Magnificent
