= Conan the Renegade =

Novel by Leonard Carpenter

- Cover of first edition
- Author: Leonard Carpenter
- Cover artist: Kirk Reinert
- Language: English
- Series: Conan the Barbarian
- Genre: Sword and sorcery
- Publisher: Tor Books
- Publication date: 1986
- Publication place: United States
- Media type: Print (Paperback)
- Pages: 276
- ISBN: 0-8125-4250-9

Conan the Renegade is a fantasy novel by American writer Leonard Carpenter, featuring Robert E. Howard's sword and sorcery hero Conan the Barbarian. It was first published in paperback by Tor Books in April 1986. The first British edition was published by Sphere Books in August 1988.

== Plot ==
The action takes place in Koth and the small neighboring realm of Khoraja. Conan joins Captain Hundulph's Free Company of mercenaries in the city of Tantusium, who is in the service of Prince Ivor in the latter's revolt against King Strabonus of Koth. Ivor is also aided by the amazon band of the warrior woman Drusandra and the sorcerer Agohoth. Conan proves an effective leader early on, and later, when taken captive, must face down a horror in a dungeon before the revolt builds to its climax.

== Reception ==
According to reviewer Ryan Harvey, Conan the Renegade "can be summed up in two words: 'mercenary adventure.' Military action takes precedence over magic and wonder ... and Conan's adventuring mostly occurs within his role as a military leader and tactician. Carpenter does toss in a few horrific fantasy events, ... but readers who want a dark fantasy Conan should look elsewhere." Ryan feels "Carpenter's glaring problem is his failure to follow through with his action. The pastiches from Tor frequently have this problem, but Carpenter caught the 'anti-climacticus' virus the worst." He rates the book "only adequate" as a battle epic, comparing it unfavorably to Howard's "The Scarlet Citadel".

Reviewer Don D'Ammassa noted "Carpenter's first Conan novel had a pretty good plot. ... The narrative is okay and the story is exciting, but Carpenter employs an artificial style in his dialogue that is absolutely leaden. Fortunately he would drop this affectation in his next book and produce a much better piece of fiction."

Conan the Renegade was loosely adapted by Roy Thomas and Mike Docherty in Conan the Barbarian 266-269.

Preceded by Conan the Fearless	Tor Conan series (publication order)	Succeeded by Conan the Raider
Preceded by The Road of Kings	Complete Conan Saga (William Galen Gray chronology)	Succeeded by "Shadows in the Moonlight"
