= Conan and the Grim Grey God =

Book by Sean A. Moore

- Cover
- Author: Sean A. Moore
- Cover artist: Doug Beekman
- Language: English
- Series: Conan the Barbarian
- Genre: Fantasy
- Publisher: Tor Books
- Publication date: 1996
- Publication place: United States
- Media type: Print (Paperback)
- Pages: 204
- ISBN: 0-8125-5267-9

Conan and the Grim Grey God is a fantasy novel written by American writer Sean A. Moore, featuring Robert E. Howard's sword and sorcery hero Conan the Barbarian. It was first published in trade paperback by Tor Books in November 1996; a regular paperback edition followed from the same publisher in November 1997.

== Plot ==
In the prelude, taking place 3,000 years before Conan's time, a raiding army from the empire of Acheron descend on the city of Nithia, located near an oasis deep within the desert, inhabited by worshippers of the peaceful and benevolent god, Ibis. The warriors systematically massacre the entire population, their goal being to gain possession of the Grim Grey God - an extremely powerful and evil artifact with mystical properties, which the priests have guarded for many centuries (not to use it, but to prevent it from being used). The Acheronian general, having killed all the priests, holds up the artifact and gloats over his victory. Fortunately, a spell unleashed by the murdered Arch-Priest of Ibis drowns him, his soldiers, and the entire city in sand.

Nithia remains buried under the desert for three thousand years, a fabled "City of Brass" whose location no one knows. Eventually, a gust of wind uncovers it. Soon, Nithia is rediscovered by a passing smuggler - and a map drawn by the smuggler falls into the hands of a pirate captain named Conan. To him, the statue of the Grim Grey God reputedly buried in Nithia's ruins represents treasure - he isn't initially aware of its dark powers. However, rivals also seek to plunder all of Nithia, including Jade, empress of the thieves' guild, Toj the assassin, and two necromancers (one of whom is Conan's recurring foe, Thoth-Amon) convinced that the statue will give them the power to restore their reign of darkness over the world, as in the days of ancient Acheron. The climax involves an ancient warrior restored to life and a world-wide threat which only Conan can overcome.

== Reception ==
Reviewer Don D'Ammassa calls the book "a quite complex sword and sorcery adventure" and "quite enjoyable."

== Relation to "The God in the Bowl" ==
"The God in the Bowl", one of the original Howard stories, introduced the god Ibis. A mysterious person in Stygia sent a strange bowl-like sarcophagus (said to be a priceless relic found among the darkened tombs far beneath the Stygian pyramids) to Caranthes of Hanumar, Priest of Ibis, "because of the love which the sender bore the priest of Ibis". In fact, this sender bore the opposite of love, the "gift" was a supernatural booby trap intended to kill the priest - but it was opened while on the way in Nemedia, caused the death of an innocent bystander, and was eventually disposed of by Conan's sword. Howard did little more with the god Ibis and his priests in the rest of the canonical Conan stories, but the above information sufficed to provide the foundation on which the elaborate structure of the present book was erected.

Preceded by Conan, Lord of the Black River	Tor Conan series (publication order)	Succeeded by Conan and the Death Lord of Thanza
Preceded by "The Gem in the Tower"	Complete Conan Saga (William Galen Gray chronology)	Succeeded by "The Pool of the Black One"
