= Queen of the Black Coast (collection) =

Book by Robert E. Howard

- Dust-jacket from the first edition
- Author: Robert E. Howard
- Illustrator: Michael R. Hague
- Cover artist: Michael R. Hague
- Language: English
- Series: Donald M. Grant Conan
- Genre: Fantasy short stories
- Publisher: Donald M. Grant, Publisher, Inc.
- Publication date: 1978
- Publication place: United States
- Media type: Print (hardback)
- Pages: 118 pp

Queen of the Black Coast is a 1978 collection of two fantasy short stories written by Robert E. Howard featuring his sword and sorcery hero Conan the Barbarian. The book was published in 1978 by Donald M. Grant, Publisher, Inc. as volume VII of their deluxe Conan set. The title story originally appeared in the magazine Weird Tales. "The Vale of Lost Women" first appeared in The Magazine of Horror.

== Contents ==
- "Queen of the Black Coast"
- "The Vale of Lost Women"

Preceded by Rogues in the House	Grant Conan series (publication order)	Succeeded by Jewels of Gwahlur
