= Conan the Great =

Novel by Leonard Carpenter

- Cover of first edition
- Author: Leonard Carpenter
- Cover artist: Ken Kelly
- Language: English
- Series: Conan the Barbarian
- Genre: Sword and sorcery
- Publisher: Tor Books
- Publication date: 1990
- Publication place: United States
- Media type: Print (Paperback)
- Pages: 277
- ISBN: 0-8125-0714-2

Conan the Great is a fantasy novel by American writer Leonard Carpenter, featuring Robert E. Howard's sword and sorcery hero Conan the Barbarian. It was first published in paperback by Tor Books in April 1990 (the 1989 date appearing on the title page verso is erroneous). It was reprinted by Tor in August 1997. It is the only one of the Tor series of Conan novels set in the period of Conan's kingship.

== Plot ==
Lord Malvin, ruler of Ophir, invades Aquilonia with King Balt of Nemedia, in order to secure the latter's support against the kingdom of Koth, which ravages his eastern marches. Unfortunately, they fail to reckon with Aquilonia's king, Conan, who meets their offensive and smashes their army, forcing them to flee the battlefield. In the wake of his battle, Conan rescues the dwarf Delvyn, jester to Balt. Delvyn, however, is not the fool he appears, but the secret instigator of the invasion and servant to Kthantos, an evil demon.

Seeking a king powerful enough to spread Kthantos's worship across the world, and disappointed in his hopes for Balt, the scheming jester insinuates himself into Conan's confidence. Delvyn feeds on Conan's anxieties about his advancing age, while heightening his concern over the resurgent strength of Koth, newly energized under its new ruler, the amoral and ruthless Prince Armiro of Khoraja. Though Conan's queen, Zenobia, and his close counselors distrust the dwarf, the king heeds him.

Contesting for empery, Aquilonia strikes east into Ophir while Koth drives west. Conan beats Armiro to the capital, Ianthe, on the Red River, by racing ahead of his army, suborning a disaffected noble to admit him to the citadel, and slaughtering the fugitive Balt. Meanwhile, Malvin is murdered by his own mistress, the warrior woman Amlunia, who promptly transfers her affections to Conan–or seems to. She is actually in league with Delvyn.

King Conan, posing as Ianthe's savior, organizes its defense as the main Aquilonian army arrives. Meanwhile, Armiro attacks the city as a feint to cover his establishment of a bridgehead across the Red River to the north. Conan challenges his rival to single combat, but Armiro cheats, secretly bringing supporters to their contest and forcing Conan into an ignominious retreat.

Leaving the war to subordinates, Conan again strikes out on his own. Concerned by rumors Armiro has imprisoned his former lover, Queen Yasmala of Khoraja, he decides to liberate her and so gain intelligence on his foe. He rides disguised across Koth to the Tarnhold, Khoraja's infamous prison fortress. Gaining entry through an underwater passage guarded by a giant water spider, he finds Yasmala indeed present, but in voluntary retirement. Armiro and some of his retainers, who had secretly followed Conan, burst in on the two; in the incursion, Yasmala's maid, Vateesa, is critically injured. The enemies renew their combat, but Conan falters when Yasmala begs him to spare Armiro, now revealed as her son. Gaining the upper hand, the prince takes the king captive, hoping to use him as a hostage.

Conan soon escapes and, as the conflict in Ophir remains stalemated, moves to turn Armiro's flank by taking the now kingless Nemedia, part of which is already in the hands of his nominee Baron Halk. Together with Delvyn and Amlunia he joins the baron and his own commander, Count Prospero, at the siege of the eastern stronghold of Numalia, which is taken by a combination of the count's siegecraft and Conan's own reckless abandon. Foregoing his customary inclination to mercy, he lets his army sack the city. The war threatens to widen as the Aquilonians prepare to invade Koth-occupied eastern Ophir through Corinthia, while Armiro invades northern Argos to strike at southern Aquilonia.

The demon god Kthantos, playing both sides, visits Yasmala, who is nursing the comatose Vateesa in their new prison. The demon attempts to possess Yasmala, a fate she evades only to fall to her death. When news of her demise reaches Conan he assumes Armiro responsible and guilty of matricide, kindling his wrath against the prince all the more. Kthantos then appears in a dream to Armiro with an offer of power; the prince is skeptical, but reports the dream to his subordinates as a holy visitation. Meanwhile, Conan's queen Zenobia, perturbed by her husband's behavior and jealous of his dalliances, receives a visitation disturbingly similar to Yasmala's.

Aquilonian corps marshall Egilrude, leading the advance into Corinthia, is challenged by a combined force of Corinthians and Brythunians. Emulating his king, Egilrude impetuously forces battle, overwhelming the defenders and pursuing their remnants into a fort guarding a neglected mountain pass, which he then takes. He learns that the pass, which locals avoid out of a superstitious dread, marks a neglected route into Koth. He sends this news back to the main Aquilonian host before his depleted force is massacred by regrouping Corinthians. Conan, arriving in time to avenge but not save him, has Egilrude posthumously declared a hero of the realm.

Conan's army ascends through the pass to a bleak plateau, empty aside from a ruined temple. The king ruminates on his middle-aged disquiet and restless yearning for action. Delvyn encourages him to envision himself emperor of the world with the godhood such a role implies, a notion previously implanted. After a disturbing dream in which Conan imagines himself drawn to his doom, he awakens to word that an army equal to his in size has entered the plateau from the Kothian side—Armiro and his host, guided by the prince's dream.

The antagonists face each other at the temple, which proves the lair of Kthantos. As the demon god hails them, Delvyn and Amlunia incite the two rulers to personal combat, the prize being mastery of their combined armies and the world under Kthantos's patronage. Both monarchs, realizing they've been used, are suspicious of the god but otherwise game, as each believes the other the instigator of Yasmala's death.

Their confrontation is interrupted by Queen Zenobia, driven by chariot in relays all the way from Aquilonia. With her is the partially recovered Vateesa, now revealed as the queen's mysterious visitor. They disclose that Armiro is not just Yasmala's son, but Conan's own as well. This balks Conan while inflaming Armiro to new fury as he vents on Conan the distress over abandonment that has afflicted him his whole life. The fight is on, and Kthantos manifests in triumph. Vateesa recognizes and denounces the demon as Yasmala's murderer, uncovering its machinations. At this the two kings put aside their quarrel and turn on Kthantos, toppling a shattered pillar into the well from which it issues. As its essence drains away, Zenobia pushes Amlunia into the well after it.

The dwarf Delvyn remains, released from his patron's spell, and is revealed in his true form—a giant twice the size of Conan. Shunned by humanity, he had studied ancient lore to achieve vengeance, which had led him to Kthantos. In his diminished guise he had played the fool, enticing kings to the demon's service until, in the troubled Conan, he had found what he deemed the perfect tool, to be first used and then supplanted. Now unmasked and thwarted, he challenges the king. Conan has his soldiers dispatch him.

Under truce, and still uncertain of their feelings for each other, Conan and Armiro resort to their advisers and diplomacy. A modus vivendi is envisioned in which both monarchs will pull back from Ophir and respect each other's spheres of influence, abandoning pretensions to sole mastery of the Hyborian world.

== Themes ==
In an original Howard story, Swords of the Northern Sea (featuring Cormac Mac Art rather than Conan, and included in the collection Tigers of the Sea) a major role is also played by a malevolent, scheming dwarf.

== Reception ==
Reviewer Don D'Ammassa calls the book "[n]ot badly written, but Conan does not feel like the same character this time. He is grasping, ambitious, ruthless, cruel, and spends lives without a second thought, even the lives of his friends. Carpenter's least interest[ing] Conan novel."

Preceded by Conan the Bold	Tor Conan series (publication order)	Succeeded by Conan the Indomitable
Preceded by The Return of Conan	Complete Conan Saga (William Galen Gray chronology)	Succeeded by "The Witch of the Mists"
