= Queen of the Black Coast =

Conan novelette by Robert E. Howard

- Short story by Robert E. Howard
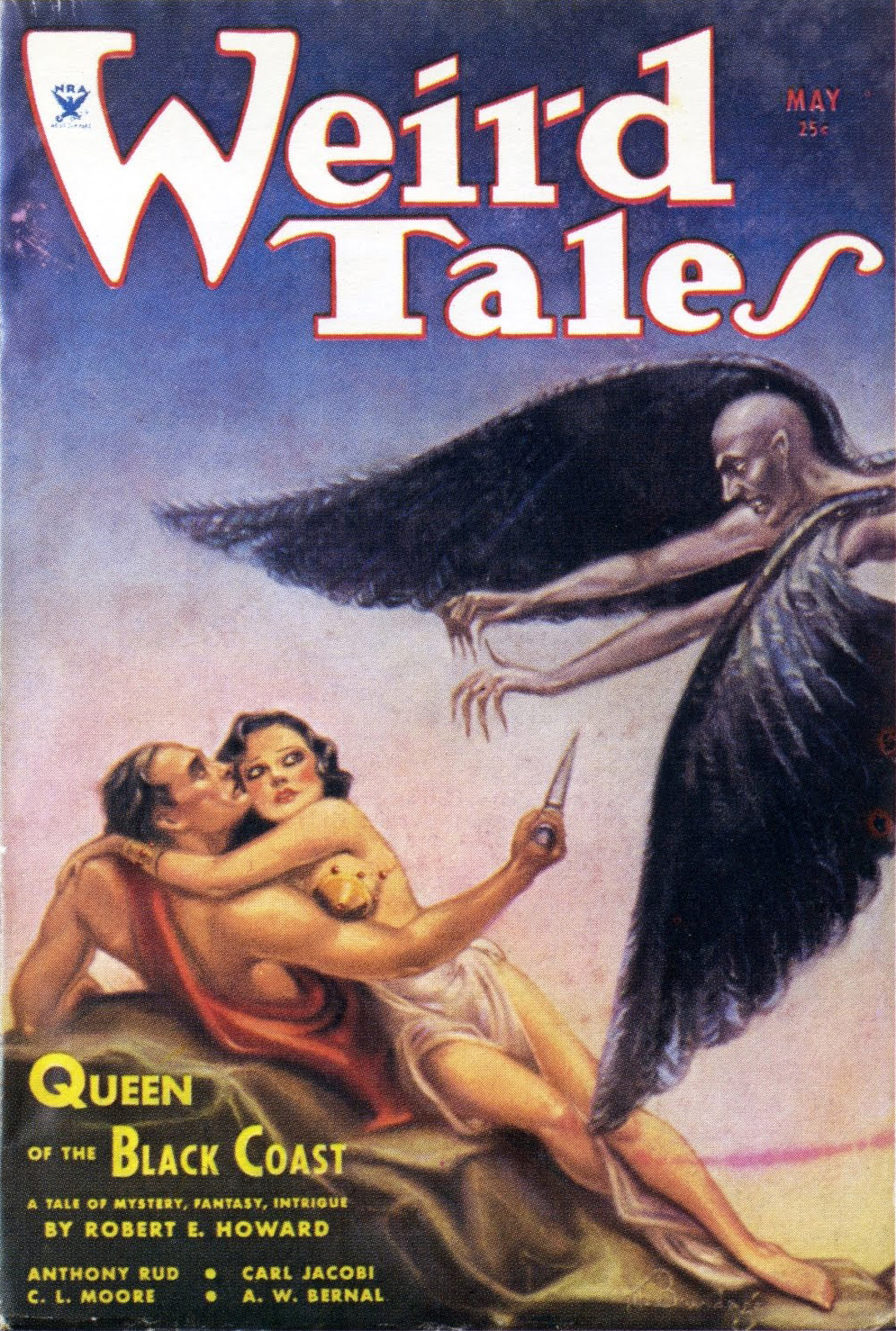
- Cover for Weird Tales, May 1934. Art by Margaret Brundage

Text available at Wikisource
- Country: United States
- Language: English
- Genre: Fantasy

Publication
- Published in: Weird Tales
- Publication type: Pulp magazine
- Publisher: Rural Publishing Corporation
- Publication date: May 1934

Chronology
- Series: Conan the Cimmerian
Shadows in the Moonlight	The Devil in Iron

"Queen of the Black Coast" is one of the original short stories about Conan the Cimmerian, written by American author Robert E. Howard and first published in Weird Tales magazine c. May 1934. Set during the fictional Hyborian Age, Conan becomes a notorious pirate plundering the coastal villages of Kush alongside Bêlit, a head-strong femme fatale.

Due to its epic scope and atypical romance, this story is an undisputed classic of Conan lore and is often cited by Howard scholars as one of his most famous tales.

Howard earned $115 selling this story to Weird Tales, and it is now in the public domain.

== Plot summary ==
In an Argossean port, Conan demands passage aboard a merchant vessel, the Argus, which is casting off for southern waters to trade beads, silks, sugar, and brass-hilted swords to the black kings of Kush. The captain objects to his demand to travel without paying for the passage, and Conan threatens him and the crew. The captain agrees to let Conan stay on board, since "It would be useful to have a fighting man on the voyage". Gradually, Conan and the captain, Tito, become friends. Conan tells Tito he is fleeing the civil authorities of Argos after a court dispute in which Conan refused to betray the whereabouts of a friend to a magistrate. Rather than betray his friend, Conan drew his sword and killed the magistrate. At this point, Conan has no experience or knowledge of the sea.

Upon reaching the pirate-infested waters of Kush, their trade ship is attacked by Bêlit's reavers. The Queen of the Black Coast, Bêlit and her ebony-skinned warriors slaughter the Argus's crew. Conan tries to rally the crew after the captain's death, and when the fight becomes hopeless, he jumps aboard the pirate ship. Conan kills many of the pirates, fully expecting to be overwhelmed and killed, when Bêlit orders her crew to spare Conan. She is impressed with the Cimmerian's courage and ferocity and sexually attracted to him. Bêlit offers to let Conan sail with her, be her chosen mate, and help lead her warriors. Smitten, Conan agrees, and they raid the Black Coast together.

Soon, rumors spread that the she-devil of the sea, Bêlit, has found a mate, an iron man whose wrath is that of a wounded lion. Survivors of butchered Stygian ships curse the name of Bêlit and her Cimmerian warrior.

Sailing up the river Zarkheba, Bêlit and Conan encounter ancient ruins containing lost treasure, a winged monstrosity, and skulking hyenas used to be men. Despite the murders of their crew and the horrors lurking in the jungle, Bêlit and Conan find time for a theological discussion comparing Conan's grim god Crom to Bêlit's more ambiguous Shemite deities. Bêlit promises that even death could not keep her from Conan's side.

Bêlit is soon captivated by a cursed necklace in the treasure. It seemingly instills the wearer with a madness and monomania. In this state, Bêlit issues faulty orders. Her crew is soon decimated, and Bêlit herself is hanged by the winged monster. Alone and raging, Conan confronts the monster. He is on the verge of being slain when Bêlit's spirit intervenes. Conan slays the winged horror and leaves the ruins with her corpse.

Conan gives Bêlit a Viking funeral, burning the ship with her and her treasures on it.

== Reception ==
Everett F. Bleiler described "Queen of the Black Coast" as "probably the best of the Conan stories, perhaps because it is the only one based on another emotion than lust, greed, or hatred."

== Publication history ==
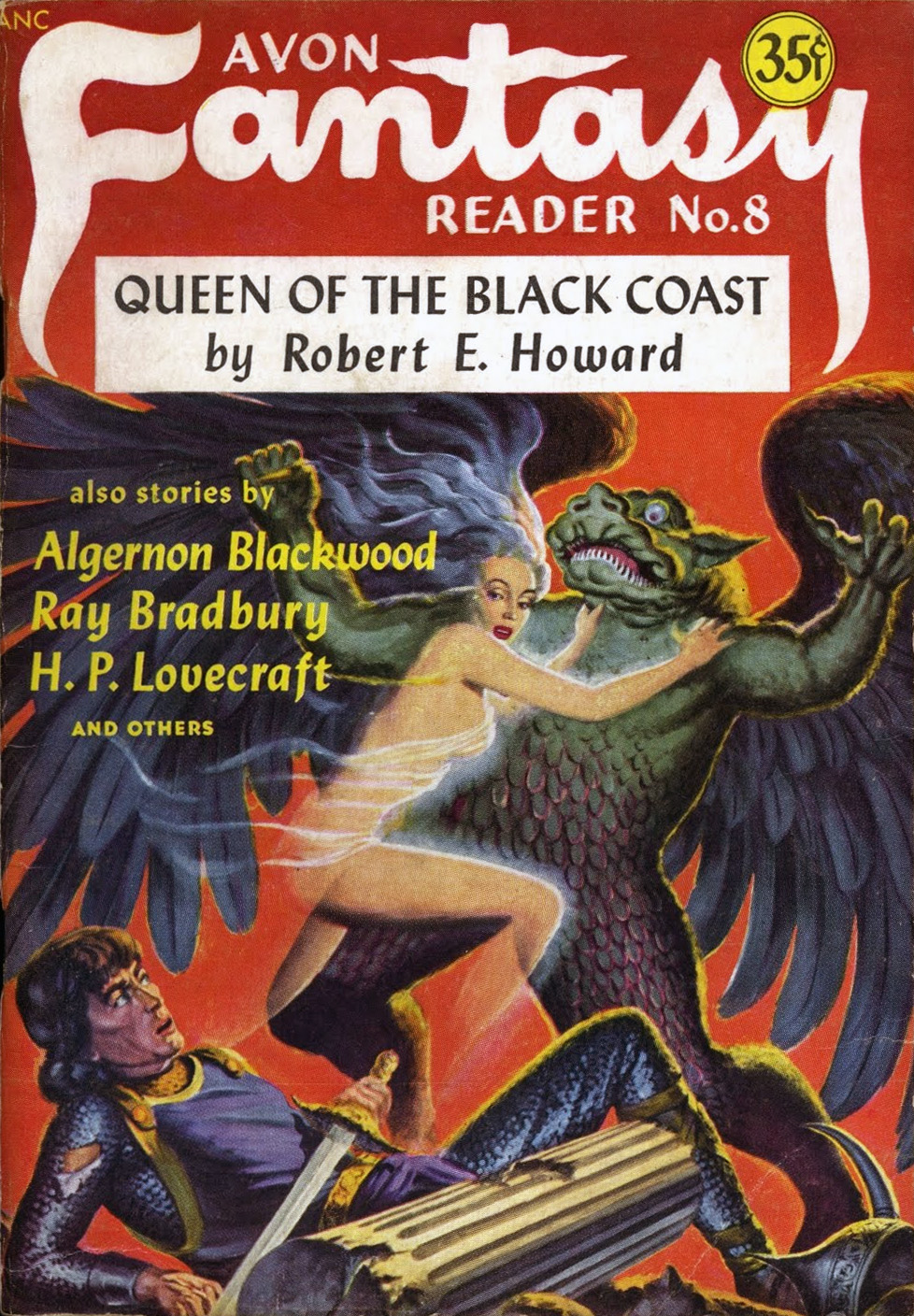
"Queen of the Black Coast" was republished in the November 1948 issue of Avon Fantasy Reader.

The story was first published in the May 1934 issue of Weird Tales magazine. It was republished in the collections The Coming of Conan (Gnome Press, 1953), Conan of Cimmeria (Lancer Books, 1969), and Queen of the Black Coast (Grant, 1978). It has more recently been republished in the collections The Conan Chronicles Volume 1: The People of the Black Circle (Gollancz, 2000) and Conan of Cimmeria: Volume One (1932-1933) (Del Rey, 2003).

== Adaptations ==
The story was adapted and expanded by Roy Thomas and John Buscema in Marvel's Conan the Barbarian issues #58 (1975) and #100 (1979), with the issues in between filling the gap between Conan's joining Bêlit's crew up until her death.

Petri Hiltunen made his own graphic novel adaptation in 1991. It has only been published in Finland.

A role-playing game adaptation for GURPS named Conan and the Queen of the Black Coast was published by Steve Jackson Games in 1989.

The concept of the woman who dies, but returns to help Conan in battle, was used in the 1982 movie Conan the Barbarian.

The Dark Horse Comics series Conan the Barbarian (2012-2014) by writer Brian Wood uses Queen of the Black Coast as the basis. Issues #1-3 drawn by Becky Cloonan depict Conan's meeting with Bêlit, and her death is told in the final four issues drawn by Riccardo Burchielli. Just as Marvel before, this version expands the story, including a story arc in which Conan takes Belit to his native Cimmeria. The series lasted 25 issues.

Jean-David Morvan and Pierre Alary adapted the story into a graphic novel published as part of Glénat's Conan le Cimmérien in Europe and Ablaze's The Cimmerian in the USA.

The story is the basis for a song of the same name by the American heavy metal band Manilla Road off their second album Metal.

Genndy Tartakovsky is set to adapt the story into an animated series at Cartoon Network Studios to stream on Amazon Prime Video.

Preceded by "Shadows in the Moonlight"	Original Howard Canon (publication order)	Succeeded by "The Devil in Iron"
Preceded by "Black Colossus"	Original Howard Canon (Dale Rippke chronology)	Succeeded by "The Snout in the Dark"
Preceded by Conan the Guardian	Complete Conan Saga (William Galen Gray chronology (Part 1)	Succeeded by Conan the Rebel
Preceded by Conan the Rebel	Complete Conan Saga (William Galen Gray chronology (Part 2)	Succeeded by Conan at the Demon's Gate
