= Conan the Barbarian (2011 novel) =

2011 novel by Michael A. Stackpole

- Cover
- Author: Michael A. Stackpole
- Language: English
- Series: Conan the Barbarian
- Genre: Sword and sorcery Fantasy novel
- Publisher: Berkley Books
- Publication date: 2011
- Publication place: United States
- Media type: Print (Paperback)
- Pages: 292
- ISBN: 978-0-425-24206-3
- OCLC: 679930060
- LC Class: PS3569.T137 C66 2011

Conan the Barbarian is a fantasy novel written by Michael A. Stackpole featuring Robert E. Howard's seminal sword and sorcery hero of the same name, a novelization of the feature film of the same name. It was first published in paperback by Berkley Books in 2011. An earlier novel of the same name by L. Sprague de Camp, Lin Carter and Catherine Crook de Camp, based on the original film of which the 2011 version was a remake, was published by Bantam Books in 1982.

== Plot summary ==
Chapters 1–11 retell the story of the hero's youth from his birth through the murder of his father and destruction of his village by raiders to the eve of the Battle of Venarium. Stackpole's version of these events is compatible with the account established in the original tales by Howard, the character's creator, references to which he incorporates into his text. In the wake of Venarium Conan ventures into an unforgiving world where he survives as a thief, pirate, and warrior on a path of wanton adventure and women.

Chapters 12–33, set years later in the wake of his piratical career on the Black Coast and subsequent sojourn in the Black Kingdoms, relate how Conan chances upon the warlord responsible for his tribe's destruction. As he tracks Khalar Zym, Conan battles monsters, Zym's henchmen, and Marique, a powerful witch.

== Reception ==
Reviewer Don D'Ammassa, noting the book's status as a "[n]ovelization of the really awful third Conan movie," feels "[t]he dialogue is flat and uninteresting" and "[t]he story is not much better. The book is still an improvement on the movie, which I could barely watch, but given the limitations of the source material, there was no way that the author was going to turn this into an interesting story."

== Notes ==
Preceded by none	Complete Conan Saga (Part 1)	Succeeded by Conan of Venarium
Preceded by The Snout in the Dark	Complete Conan Saga (Part 2)	Succeeded by Conan the Gladiator
