= Black Colossus (collection) =

1979 book by Robert E. Howard

- Dust-jacket from the first edition
- Author: Robert E. Howard
- Illustrator: Ned Dameron
- Cover artist: Ned Dameron
- Language: English
- Series: Donald M. Grant Conan
- Genre: Fantasy
- Publisher: Donald M. Grant, Publisher, Inc.
- Publication date: 1979
- Publication place: United States
- Media type: Print (hardback)
- Pages: 185 pp

Black Colossus is a 1979 collection of two fantasy short stories written by Robert E. Howard featuring his sword and sorcery hero Conan the Barbarian. The book was published in 1979 by Donald M. Grant, Publisher, Inc. as volume IX of their deluxe Conan set. The stories originally appeared in the magazine Weird Tales.

== Contents ==
- "Black Colossus"
- "Shadows in the Moonlight"

Preceded by Jewels of Gwahlur	Grant Conan series (publication order)	Succeeded by The Pool of the Black One
