= Conan and the Death Lord of Thanza =

Novel by Roland J. Green

- Cover of first edition.
- Author: Roland Green
- Cover artist: Charles Keegan
- Language: English
- Series: Conan the Barbarian
- Genre: Sword and sorcery
- Publisher: Tor Books
- Publication date: 1997
- Publication place: United States
- Media type: Print (Paperback)
- Pages: 267
- ISBN: 0-812-55268-7

Conan and the Death Lord of Thanza is a fantasy novel by American writer Roland Green, featuring Robert E. Howard's sword and sorcery hero Conan the Barbarian. It was first published in paperback by Tor Books in January 1997.

== Plot summary ==
Following the events of "The Star of Khorala", Conan is a wanted man in Ophir and flees to Aquilonia. He ends up in the city of Shamar, in the Thanza Mountains bordering Nemedia. Soon, he joins Captain Klarnides and his Thanza Rangers, who protect the region against raiders. A greater threat soon emerges in the form of Baron Grolin, who aspires supremacy in the region. Grolin seeks a chest containing the Soul of Thanza, a jewel said to gain its possessor mastery over death. He's aided in his quest by the bandit chieftainess, Lysinka of Mertyos, and a mysterious wizard. Lysinka changes sides after Grolin abandons her in a fight with the Rangers. Warned of the baron's intention, the Rangers attempt to locate the Soul first to prevent him from becoming a Death Lord. Failing, they are aided in their final battle by the Slayers of Death, an army of skeletal warriors charged with defeating the Death Lord. Together, they put an end to the transformed baron's ambitions.

== Reception ==
Reviewer Ryan Harvey called the book "the second worst Conan novel I've read," superior only to Conan and the Mists of Doom another of Green's Conan novels. While crediting it with "clever monsters, sword fights, sorceries, and interesting plot ideas," all of these, in his opinion, "cannot overcome slipshod writing and lack of passion for the material." On the plus side, he feels that "[a] struggle with a water dragon works better than most other action scenes, and the skeleton army could have worked if handled with more imagination." He also notes that "Lysinka, a typical warrior-woman, works better than she should. Her attraction to Conan feels realistic and believable. It's a small touch, and one of the few successes in the novel." The Death Lord he considers "a good concept, and Grolin's seizure of its power makes for the most effective sequence in the whole novel. But it arrives after the book has lost most of its momentum and it doesn't renew interest in the story." Summing up, he rates the book "Conan pastiche at its most bland," that "feels like exactly what it is: a writer-for-hire pounding out pages in a short space of time. I can't imagine Mr. Green had much fun writing this book, and consequently I had very little fun reading it."

| Preceded by Conan and the Grim Grey God | Tor Conan series (publication order) | Succeeded by Conan of Venarium |
| Preceded by "The Star of Khorala" | Complete Conan Saga (William Galen Gray chronology) | Succeeded by Conan and the Amazon |
