= Conan at the Demon's Gate =

Book by Roland J. Green

- Cover of first edition
- Author: Roland Green
- Cover artist: Ken Kelly
- Language: English
- Series: Conan the Barbarian
- Genre: Sword and sorcery
- Publisher: Tor Books
- Publication date: 1994
- Publication place: United States
- Media type: Print (Paperback)
- Pages: 278
- ISBN: 0-812-52491-8

Conan at the Demon's Gate is a fantasy novel by American writer Roland Green, featuring Robert E. Howard's sword and sorcery hero Conan the Barbarian. It was first published in trade paperback by Tor Books in November 1994; a regular paperback edition followed from the same publisher in August 1996.

== Plot ==
In a first-person prologue set during the sixth year of Conan the Second's (formerly Prince Conn) reign over Aquilonia, a soldier, Nidaros, tells of his company's harrowing experiences during a frontier war with the Picts. The prologue culminates when Nidaros, his companion, Sarabos, and their followers are trapped by the enemy inside a cave. The Picts seem to fear the place, understandably, since it shows signs of having once been a site sacred to Set, the serpent god of Stygia. Oddly, the Aquilonians also discover a great stone statue in the image of the former king Conan the First (or Conan the Great, as he is also remembered). Should they doubt it, they need only look at Sarabos; it's an open secret that he is a bastard son of the first Conan, and hence a half-brother of Conn.

The tale then shifts to events many years earlier in the life of Conan the First, well before he became ruler of Aquilonia, in the wake of "Queen of the Black Coast". Following the death of his lover, the pirate queen Belit, Conan ventures inland into the jungles of Kush. He encounters and joins forces with a band of Bamula tribesmen. Aiding the Bamulas in their conflict with an enemy tribe, he rises to a position of precarious authority among them.

Suddenly, creatures alien to the Bamulas begin invading their territory, including a dragon and a polar bear. They turn out to have been transported through a magical portal. Entering the portal with his warriors in an attempt to end the threat, Conan finds himself teleported to the far-distant Pictish Wilderness. The portal, known as the Demon's Gate, turns out to be the creation of an exiled wizard. He intends on sacrificing both Conan and the Bamulas, so he can animate the statue of an ancient warrior for his own evil purposes.

Plot complications present themselves in the form of the wizard's beautiful daughter and the native Picts, who are violently hostile towards all strangers. All of Conan's prowess and craft are needed to deal with the impossible situation as one threat follows another in rapid succession.

Much of the concluding portion of this story is narrated to Nidaros and Sarabos by their comrade in arms, Vasilios, a half-Pictish Aquilonian warrior who had heard it in turn from his Pictish mother. The tale gradually unfolds of how Conan eventually defeated his enemies, before transporting himself and the Bamulas safely back to their country—and how the statue took on his aspect.

An epilogue returns the scene to Nidaros, Sarabos, and their companions listening to the end of Vasilios's tale. The company is rescued from the besieging Picts by a relief force who had been informed of their plight by a mysterious messenger the very evening they were trapped in the cave. According to Vasilios, it's said that the statue will aid the blood-kin of the warrior it is fashioned after at need, and the three speculate that the messenger was a magical sending from the statue, prompted by Sarabos's presence. They decide to keep silent about it.

== Reception ==
Critic Don D'Ammassa wrote "The two halves of the novel feel very different – an African survival story followed by the familiar battle with sorcery. Okay, but Green's weakest Conan novel to date."

Preceded by Conan and the Manhunters	Tor Conan series (publication order)	Succeeded by Conan the Gladiator
Preceded by "Queen of the Black Coast"	Complete Conan Saga (William Galen Gray chronology) (main narrative)	Succeeded by "The Vale of Lost Women"
Preceded by Conan of the Isles	Complete Conan Saga (framing sequence)	Succeeded by "Death-Song of Conan the Cimmerian"
