= The Tower of the Elephant (collection) =

1975 short story collection by Robert E. Howard

- Dust-jacket from the first edition
- Author: Robert E. Howard
- Illustrator: Richard Robertson
- Cover artist: Richard Robertson
- Language: English
- Series: Donald M. Grant Conan
- Genre: Fantasy
- Publisher: Donald M. Grant, Publisher, Inc.
- Publication date: 1975
- Publication place: United States
- Media type: Print (hardback)
- Pages: 94

The Tower of the Elephant is a 1975 collection of two fantasy short stories by American writer Robert E. Howard featuring his sword and sorcery hero Conan the Barbarian. The book was published in 1975 by Donald M. Grant, Publisher, Inc. as the third volume of their deluxe Conan set. The title story originally appeared in the magazine Weird Tales. "The God in the Bowl" is the original version of the story that first appeared, edited by L. Sprague de Camp, in the magazine Space Science Fiction.

== Contents ==
- "The Tower of the Elephant"
- "The God in the Bowl"

== Sources ==
- Chalker, Jack L.; Mark Owings (1998). The Science-Fantasy Publishers: A Bibliographic History, 1923-1998. Westminster, MD and Baltimore: Mirage Press, Ltd. p. 322.

Preceded by A Witch Shall be Born	Grant Conan series (publication order)	Succeeded by "Red Nails"
