= Conan and the Amazon =

Book by John Maddox Roberts

- Cover of first edition
- Author: John Maddox Roberts
- Cover artist: Ken Kelly
- Language: English
- Series: Conan the Barbarian
- Genre: Sword and sorcery
- Publisher: Tor Books
- Publication date: 1995
- Publication place: United States
- Media type: Print (paperback)
- Pages: 276
- ISBN: 0-8125-2493-4

Conan and the Amazon is a fantasy novel by American writer John Maddox Roberts, featuring Robert E. Howard's sword and sorcery hero Conan the Barbarian. It was first published in paperback by Tor Books in April 1995. It was reprinted by Tor in April 1999.

== Plot ==
Fresh from a failed rebellion in Brythunia, in which he served as a mercenary on the opposing side, Conan joins forces with a tribe of native warriors led by Achilea (former queen of the Amazons). Achilea is guiding a pair of mysterious twins in their search for the ancient city of Jangar. The warriors travel across Zamora, Koth, and the Stygian Desert before crossing a range of southeastern mountains.

Conan's allies eventually reach the city, cursed by the gods after an ancient battle. Jangar is still in good condition despite its supposed desertion and was, in fact, never abandoned. The citizens, who loathe the sun, live within a subterranean city beneath the ruins of their old one.

Caught between the evil agenda of his demonic employers and the Jangarians, Conan finds himself trapped in his battle with a giant crocodile as the city approaches its eventual destruction.

== Reception ==
Don D'Ammassa, writing of Roberts' Conan novels, noted that "[a]lthough Roberts did not recreate Howard's character exactly, making him more intellectual and less inclined to solve every problem by hitting it with a sword, his evocation of the barbaric setting is superior to that of most of the other writers contributing to the series." This novel, D'Ammassa writes, "was pretty good but it was actually the least interesting of Roberts' Conan novel[s]."

Reviewer Ryan Harvey considered Roberts "the most consistently entertaining" of the Tor Conan authors, showing "deft ability with storytelling and action scenes, and a thankful tendency not to overplay his hand and try to ape Robert E. Howard’s style. ... However, Roberts had his down moments, and alas he stumbled at the finish line. Conan and the Amazon is the last of Roberts’s Conan novels. It’s also his poorest." He rates it "above average for the Tor novels, [but] a disappointment for its author. It moves too slowly, and the action is jumbled into a hasty mess at the conclusion." In another place he notes that he "would hate to judge John Maddox Roberts based on Conan and the Amazon ... [a] poor work... from [an] otherwise skilled pastiche writer..."

Preceded by Conan the Gladiator	Tor Conan series (publication order)	Succeeded by Conan and the Mists of Doom
Preceded by Conan and the Death Lord of Thanza	Complete Conan Saga (William Galen Gray chronology)	Succeeded by "The Devil in Iron"
