= The Coming of Conan =

Book by Robert E. Howard

- Cover of first edition
- Author: Robert E. Howard
- Language: English
- Genre: Swords & sorcery, fantasy
- Publisher: Gnome Press
- Publication date: 1953
- Publication place: United States
- Media type: Print (hardback)

The Coming of Conan is a collection of eight fantasy short stories by American writer Robert E. Howard, featuring his sword and sorcery heroes Kull and Conan the Barbarian, together with the first part of his pseudo-history of the "Hyborian Age" in which the Conan tales were set. It was first published in hardcover in the United States by Gnome Press in 1953 and by Boardman Books in the United Kingdom in 1954. The stories originally appeared in the 1930s in the fantasy magazine Weird Tales. The collection never saw publication in paperback; instead, its component stories were split and distributed among other "Kull" and "Conan" collections.

== Contents ==
- "Introduction" (L. Sprague de Camp)
  - March 10, 1933 letter from Robert E. Howard to P. Schuyler Miller
  - Undated letter from H. P. Lovecraft to Donald A. Wollheim on "The Hyborian Age"
- "The Hyborian Age, Part 1"
- "The Shadow Kingdom" (Kull)
- "The Mirrors of Tuzun Thune" (Kull)
- "The King and the Oak" (Kull)
- "The Tower of the Elephant"
- "The God in the Bowl"
- "Rogues in the House"
- "The Frost-Giant's Daughter"
- "Queen of the Black Coast"

Chronologically, the short stories collected as The Coming of Conan are the earliest in Gnome's Conan series; the stories collected as Conan the Barbarian follow.

== Reception ==
New York Times reviewer Villiers Gerson praised the stories as "unusual adult fairy tale[s] [with] a verve and dash seldom found in such thud-and-blunder stories." P. Schuyler Miller praised the volume as "some of the best of the fantastic, bloody exploits of Conan the Cimmerian in a world that never was."

Preceded by none	Gnome Conan series (chronological order)	Succeeded by Conan the Barbarian
