= Conan and the Emerald Lotus =

Book by John C. Hocking

- Cover of first edition
- Author: John C. Hocking
- Cover artist: Ciruelo Cabral
- Language: English
- Series: Conan the Barbarian
- Genre: Sword and sorcery
- Publisher: Tor Books
- Publication date: 1995
- Publication place: United States
- Media type: Print (Paperback)
- Pages: 279
- ISBN: 0-8125-4499-4

Conan and the Emerald Lotus is a fantasy novel by American writer John C. Hocking, featuring Robert E. Howard's sword and sorcery hero Conan the Barbarian. It was first published in trade paperback by Tor Books in November 1995; a regular paperback edition followed from the same publisher in September 1999.

According to Hocking, he wrote the novel out of dissatisfaction with the Conan novels being published in the early 1990s, "trying to put into the story all the things I thought were missing from Conan pastiche at that time." After taking three years to write it, he was proud enough of the result that he "didn't want to just drop it into a drawer ....[s]o I sent out a handful of letters, and L. Sprague de Camp responded ...that if I sent him my book he'd look it over. He liked it a lot and LOTUS was published."

== Plot ==
Having refused to enter the service of a Stygian wizard, Ethram-Fal, Conan suffers a curse which is gradually robbing him of his life. The beautiful sorceress, Lady Zelandra, offers to lift his curse if Conan retrieves for her a deadly emerald lotus which she is addicted to—currently in the possession of Ethram-Fal. To save his own life from the evil wizard, Conan must challenge Ethram-Fal again by stealing Zelandra's prize from his desert fortress. During his adventure, Conan faces off against bandits, a demon disguised as an oasis, and zombie bodyguards. He's aided in his quest by the dagger-throwing Neesa and a mute thief named Heng Shih.

== Reception ==
According to Howard Andrew Jones, "If you were to ask Conan fans who wrote the best Conan story after Robert E. Howard, a lot of people would point to John Hocking. ... it is Hocking, above all, who consistently makes people's favorites list. ... Hocking may well be one of the best hopes readers of sword and sorcery have today."

Preceded by Conan and the Mists of Doom	Tor Conan series (publication order)	Succeeded by Conan and the Shaman's Curse
Preceded by Conan the Gladiator	Complete Conan Saga (William Galen Gray chronology)	Succeeded by "Hawks over Shem"
