= Conan, Lord of the Black River =

Novel by Leonard Carpenter

- Cover of the first edition
- Author: Leonard Carpenter
- Cover artist: Doug Beekman
- Language: English
- Series: Conan the Barbarian
- Genre: Sword and sorcery
- Publisher: Tor Books
- Publication date: 1996
- Publication place: United States
- Media type: Print (Paperback)
- Pages: 274
- ISBN: 0-812-55266-0

Conan, Lord of the Black River is a fantasy novel by American writer Leonard Carpenter, featuring Robert E. Howard's sword and sorcery hero Conan the Barbarian. It was first published in paperback by Tor Books in April 1996.

== Plot ==
After successfully fulfilling his commission to overthrow a tyrannical baron in Koth, Conan travels into Baalur, a city-state in Shem. The queen of Baalur, Rufia, needs his aid. Baalur is suffering from a plague cast upon it by Zeriti, an old enemy of his previously believed dead. Zeriti seeks to settle a score dating from Conan's previous encounter with the two women, told in the story "Hawks Over Shem", and her curse is transforming Rufia's subjects into hideous zombies.

With an army of Baalurian soldiers, Conan begins his journey to retrieve a white lotus, the primary antidote for removing Zeriti's cruse, said to only bloom near the source of the Styx, the infamous black river. His army marches across the city-state of Nedrezzar before reaching the port city of Asgalun, where they set sail for the Styx, which serves as a boundary between Shem and the ancient kingdom of Stygia. The crew follow the river down a vast tributary to the east and travel south as it flows into the Black Kingdoms. The expedition encounter many dangers along the way, including pirates, hostile local rulers, religious cults, and cannibals before reaching the Styx's headwaters.

At the source of the Styx, they face their worst and final challenge, Zeriti's bloodthirsty undead lover. However, the white lotus is finally secured and Conan's crewmembers return down the river. After a final encounter with Zeriti in Asgalun, they return to Baalur and cure the city's inhabitants.

| Preceded by Conan and the Shaman's Curse | Tor Conan series (publication order) | Succeeded by Conan and the Grim Grey God |
| Preceded by Conan and the Treasure of Python | Complete Conan Saga (William Galen Gray chronology) | Succeeded by Conan the Rogue |
