= Jewels of Gwahlur (collection) =

1979 collection of short stories by Robert E. Howard

- Dust-jacket from the first edition
- Author: Robert E. Howard
- Illustrator: Dean Morrissey
- Cover artist: Dean Morrissey
- Language: English
- Series: Donald M. Grant Conan
- Genre: Fantasy
- Publisher: Donald M. Grant, Publisher, Inc.
- Publication date: 1979
- Publication place: United States
- Media type: Print (hardback)
- Pages: 122 pp

Jewels of Gwahlur is a 1979 collection of two fantasy short stories written by Robert E. Howard featuring his sword and sorcery hero Conan the Barbarian. The book was published in 1979 by Donald M. Grant, Publisher, Inc. as volume VIII of their deluxe Conan set. The title story originally appeared in the magazine Weird Tales. "The Snout in the Dark" is the original fragment of a story that Howard never completed. It first appeared, completed by L. Sprague de Camp and Lin Carter, in the collection Conan of Cimmeria.

== Contents ==
- "Jewels of Gwahlur"
- "The Snout in the Dark"

| Preceded by Queen of the Black Coast | Grant Conan series (publication order) | Succeeded by Black Colossus |
