= Death-Song of Conan the Cimmerian =

Poem

"Death-Song of Conan the Cimmerian" is a 1972 fantasy narrative poem by American writer Lin Carter, featuring Robert E. Howard's sword and sorcery hero Conan the Barbarian. It was first published in Glenn Lord's Howard fanzine The Howard Collector, no. 17 (v. 3, no. 5), Autumn, 1972, and reprinted in Carter's poetry collection Dreams from R'lyeh, (Arkham House, 1975) and the magazine The Savage Sword of Conan v. 1, no. 8, October 1975. This last appearance included illustrations by Jess Jodloman.

The poem is the last work of fiction chronologically about the title character.

== Content ==
The poem consists of nine seven-line stanzas in a modified ballad measure, with rhyme scheme ABABAAB. It is told from the point of view of Conan, reflecting on his life and setting forth his personal philosophy as his death approaches.

Conan relishes his memories of the life he has led and the friends he has made even as he feels the bite of mortality. Power and material gain, for which he has striven all his life, are acknowledged as ephemeral: "They crumble into clods." He faces his death unflinchingly, pairing life's hard-won pleasures with the ravages of age and extinction in an almost off-hand fashion, each tempering the other. Life is to be lived to the fullest in full awareness of the inevitability of death, while death can be borne with a certain satisfaction in the light of a life fully lived.

The central repeated image is of Conan traveling along a "long" and "hard" road with the company of a number of friends or companions emblematic of the kinds of people he knew in life. Included are "thief and harlot, king and guard / Warrior, wizard, knave and bard," and "Rogue and reaver and firebrand." They have gone through their journey a "merry, jesting band / Who asked no easier track," making their own cheer "Under an empty sky."

Less material entities also accompany them: "life rode laughing at my right hand / And Death rode at my back." The gods of the imagined "Hyborian Age" in which Conan is supposed to have lived are alluded to, and in one instance named in an oath, but characterized as inconsequential: "I laugh at your little gods!" The paramount divine figures featured in the poem are rather Death and the Devil, though the latter, while prominent in the poem, is otherwise alien to the fictional milieu in which the Conan stories are set.

Life is portrayed as a game of chance, and Death and the Devil as Conan's opponents in life's game: "I won what a man may win: / Aye, gambled and won at the Devil's game" - "the Devil take the odds" - "I'll stride down the scarlet throat of hell / And dice for the Devil's throne!" - "Life's but a game Death and I have played / Many a wearisome year." Even these opponents are scoffed at - Conan notes he has "mocked at Death's skull-grin" - even as their triumph is acknowledged.

Conan and the poem conclude: "I begrudge no foot of the road I strayed / The road which endeth HERE!"

== Notes ==
Preceded by Conan at the Demon's Gate (framing sequence)	Complete Conan Saga	Succeeded by none
