= J. Steven York =

American novelist

- Born: 1957 (age 68–69); Alabama, U.S.

J. Steven York (born 1957 in Alabama, United States) is an American science fiction and fantasy writer.

York was born in rural southeast Alabama and from childhood showed a strong interest in science fiction, fantasy and space exploration. It was only a matter of time before his vivid imagination drove him to share his stories and interests in the form of writing.

His first professional writing sale was to the now-defunct magazine Science & Mechanics, a non-fiction article about fantastic vehicles built for science fiction movies, such as the Landmaster from the movie Damnation Alley. The article was written in collaboration with high-school friend Gordon B. McComb. York continued to work writing non-fiction articles and reviews for magazines for many years, but his love of science-fiction never left him.

He began to write short stories, and his first fiction sale "Starbird" was published in an anthology in 1989. Later short fiction sales were made to Analog Science Fiction and Science Fact and The Magazine of Fantasy & Science Fiction, as well as many smaller magazines and anthologies. Sales to award-winning small-press Pulphouse Publishing led to him and his wife Christina F. York editing The Report a non-fiction writing magazine that published until the demise of Pulphouse itself several years later.

During this period, he also began to work with Eugene, Oregon computer game company Dynamix (later a division of Sierra Entertainment), first as a technical writer documenting game tools, then later as a creative writer on PC games. His first game project was the cult-favorite strategy game MissionForce: Cyberstorm. Following this he would take a much more major role in the game Outpost 2: Divided Destiny, as writer and story designer. In addition to his contributions to the game itself, the CD release included a novel-length prose work written by York, Divided Destiny. This could be considered York's first published novel, despite the unconventional format. He also provided uncredited writing for the 1999 Dynamix release Starsiege.

York is currently best known as a writer of tie-in fiction. His first print novel is the Marvel comic-book tie-in Generation X: Crossroads, published by Ace Books in 1998. A direct sequel, Generation X: Genogoths was published in 2000. Other long-form tie-in works include two novels (with a third on the way) in the MechWarrior: Dark Age series, two e-books in the Star Trek Starfleet Engineering Corps series (in collaboration with his wife Christina F. York), and the Anok, Heretic of Stygia trilogy in the Age of Conan: Hyborian Adventures novel series. Short-story tie-ins have also appeared in X-Men and Transformers themed anthologies.

York also collaborated with author Dean Wesley Smith on a pair of novellas based on the Bolo stories of late science-fiction author Keith Laumer, which were published in the anthologies Old Guard and Cold Steel, from Baen Books.

York currently lives on the Oregon coast, with his wife Christina F. York, where he continues to work on both original and tie-in fiction. In addition, he maintains a web comic called Minions at Work, as well as two sites dedicated to his and his wife's fiction writing; York Writers & Tsunami Ridge Publishing.
