= Dreams from R'lyeh =

1975 collection of poems by Lin Carter

- Jacket illustration of first edition
- Author: Lin Carter
- Cover artist: Tim Kirk
- Language: English
- Genre: poetry
- Publisher: Arkham House
- Publication date: 1975
- Publication place: United States
- Media type: Print (Hardback)
- Pages: xv, 72
- ISBN: 0-87054-067-X
- OCLC: 1323872
- Dewey Decimal: 811/.5/4
- LC Class: PS3553.A7823 D7

Dreams from R'lyeh is a collection of poems by Lin Carter. The book was released in hardcover by Arkham House in 1975 in an edition of 3,152 copies. It was Carter's only book published by Arkham House. The title sequence of sonnets, "Dreams from R'lyeh", has also been reprinted in Robert M. Price's The Xothic Legend Cycle: The Complete Mythos Fiction of Lin Carter (Chaosium, 1997).

== Background ==
Carter conceived the sonnet cycle Dreams from R'lyeh as early as 1959, as revealed by a note in his 1959 publication Letter to Judith, where the cycle is announced as forthcoming. Most of the poems were written in the 1960s and were first published in the poetry anthology Fire and Sleet and Candlelight (1961) and the magazines The Arkham Collector and Amra. The sequence of numbered poems wasn't initially the same as depicted in the Arkham House volume. Most of the non-cycle poems were reprinted from various sources, a few of them from Carter's earlier poetry collections Sandalwood and Jade (1951) and Galleon of Dream (1953).

== Summary ==
The sonnet cycle Dreams from R'lyeh, which comprises the first two-thirds of the book, consists of poems inspired by H. P. Lovecraft and the Cthulhu Mythos. Unlike Lovecraft's Fungi from Yuggoth, where the sonnets don't tell a continuous story, Dreams from R'lyeh from start to finish clearly narrates the story of Wilbur Nathaniel Hoag, from his childhood to just before his disappearance in late 1944. Mental (and perhaps physical) degeneration are apparent near the last sonnet.

The remainder of the verses are on various topics, celebrating other fantasy authors or reflecting on fantastic themes. "Diombar's Song of the Last Battle" is a heroic poem set in the prehistory of Carter's "Thongor" novels, and "Death-Song of Conan the Cimmerian" an end-of-life summation of Robert E. Howard's barbarian hero Conan, written from the perspective of the character himself.

== Contents ==
- "Merlin on the Queens Express", by L. Sprague de Camp
- Dreams from R'lyeh: A Sonnet Cycle
  - I. "Remembrances" (from Amra v. 2, no. 28, Jun. 1964)
  - II. "Arkham" (from Amra v. 2, no. 28, Jun. 1964)
  - III. "The Festival" (from Amra v. 2, no. 28, Jun. 1964)
  - IV. "The Old Wood" (from Amra v. 2, no. 28, Jun. 1964)
  - V. "The Locked Attic" (from Amra v. 2, no. 28, Jun. 1964)
  - VI. "The Shunned Church" (from Amra v. 2, no. 28, Jun. 1964)
  - VII. "The Last Ritual" (from Amra v. 2, no. 28, Jun. 1964)
  - VIII. "The Library" (from Amra v. 2, no. 32, Mar. 1965)
  - IX. "Black Thirst" (from The Arkham Collector no. 8, Win. 1971)
  - X. "The Elder Age" (from Amra v. 2, no. 47, Aug. 1968)
  - XI. "Lost R'lyeh" (from Amra v. 2, no. 39, Mar. 1966)
  - XII. "Unknown Kadath" (from Amra v. 2, no. 39, Mar. 1966)
  - XIII. "Abdul Alhazred" (from Amra v. 2, no. 39, Mar. 1966)
  - XIV. "Hyperborea" (from Amra v. 2, no. 47, Aug. 1968)
  - XV. "The Book of Eibon" (from Amra v. 2, no. 47, Aug. 1968)
  - XVI. "Tsathoggua" (from Amra v. 2, no. 32, Mar. 1965)
  - XVII. "Black Zimbabwe"
  - XVIII. "The Return" (from Amra v. 2, no. 39, Mar. 1966)
  - XIX. "The Sabbat" (from Fire and Sleet and Candlelight, 1961, and Amra v. 2, no. 32, Mar. 1965)
  - XX. "Black Lotus" (from Amra v. 2, no. 32, Mar. 1965)
  - XXI. "The Unspeakable" (from Amra v. 2, no. 32, Mar. 1965)
  - XXII. "Carcosa" (from Fire and Sleet and Candlelight, 1961, and Amra v. 2, no. 32, Mar. 1965)
  - XXIII. "The Candidate" (from Amra v. 2, no. 32, Mar. 1965)
  - XXIV. "The Dream-Daemon" (from Fire and Sleet and Candlelight, 1961, and Amra v. 2, no. 39, Mar. 1966)
  - XXV. "Dark Yuggoth" (from Fire and Sleet and Candlelight, 1961, and Amra v. 2, no. 39, Mar. 1966)
  - XXVI. "The Silver Key" (from Amra v. 2, no. 39, Mar. 1966)
  - XXVII. "The Peaks Beyond Throk" (from Amra v. 2, no. 47, Aug. 1968)
  - XXVIII. "Spawn of the Black Goat" (from Amra v. 2, no. 47, Aug. 1968)
  - XXIX. "Beyond" (from Amra v. 2, no. 47, Aug. 1968)
  - XXX. "The Accursed" (from Amra v. 2, no. 47, Aug. 1968)
  - XXXI. "The Million favored Ones" (from Amra v. 2, no. 47, Aug. 1968)
- Other Poems
  - "Lunae Custodiens" (from Fire and Sleet and Candlelight, 1961)
  - "Merlin, Enchanted"
  - "To Clark Ashton Smith" (from The Arkham Collector no. 6, Win. 1970)
  - "Once in Fabled Grandeur" (from Sandalwood and Jade, 1951, and Asmodeus, Spr. 1952)
  - "The Night Kings" (from Sandalwood and Jade, 1951)
  - "All Hallow's Eve" (from The Arkham Collector no. 7, Sum. 1970)
  - "Shard" (from Sandalwood and Jade, 1951)
  - "The Wind in the Rigging" (from Galleon of Dream, 1953)
  - "Diombar's Song of the Last Battle" (from Amra v. 2, no. 40, Jun. 1966)
  - "The Elf-King's Castle"
  - "To Lord Dunsany" (from Sandalwood and Jade, 1951)
  - "The Forgotten" (from Witchcraft & Sorcery #5, Jan./Feb. 1971)
  - "Golden Age"
  - "Lines Written to a Painting by Hannes Bok"
  - "Death-Song of Conan the Cimmerian" (from The Howard Collector #17, Aut. 1972)
- "Author's Note"

== Reception ==
Fritz Leiber, reviewing the collection in Fantastic, cites "[o]ne poem, "Shard," [as] very nice," and comments on the "delightfully Cthulhu-cultish cover by Tim Kirk, best current Arkham artist," while otherwise singling out isolated lines from various of its poems for approval or disapproval.

The collection was also reviewed by W. N. MacPherson in The Science Fiction Review, May 1975, Daniel Bailey in Myrddin, August 1975, Stuart David Schiff in Whispers #6/7, June 1975, and #8, December 1975, and C. D. Whateley in Crypt of Cthulhu #13, Roodmas 1983.
