= Sean A. Moore =

American novelist

- Born: April 20, 1964
- Died: February 23, 1998 (aged 33)
- Occupation: Author
- Writing career
- Genres: Fantasy, science fiction

Sean A. Moore (April 20, 1964 – February 23, 1998) was an American fantasy and science fiction writer, and computer programmer. His primary significance as a writer is for his three pastiche novels featuring Robert E. Howard's sword and sorcery hero Conan and for his work on the screenplay of the movie Kull the Conqueror, and novelization of the same film.

== Life ==
Moore was a resident of Boulder, Colorado, where he worked in the field of computer programming in a number of different capacities, including programmer, systems operations specialist, and writer of computer games. He was employed as a programmer by Aspen Systems, Inc. He was also a designer of board games. His hobbies included playing computer games and fencing.

Moore was married. He died in a car crash in Boulder in 1998. Services were held five days after his death in Denver.

== Writing career ==
Moore was active as both a fan and a professional writer in the community of Colorado fantasy and science fiction enthusiasts. Initially writing part-time, he had become a full-time writer at the time of his death, primarily for Tor Books. His last work was an unfinished science fiction horror novel, provisionally titled Diggers. He was a member of the Science Fiction and Fantasy Writers of America (SFWA).

== Works ==
Among Moore's works are three Conan novels and the novelization of the film Kull the Conqueror, all published by Tor Books. He also contributed in an uncredited capacity to the screenplay of the film, and wrote the novelette "10585," published in the anthology It Came from the Drive-In (DAW Books, 1996).

== Reception ==
Moore has been both praised for his "strengths ... in crafting a clever, dense plot with immense, epic scope, and populating it with an imaginative flood of action and monsters," and criticized for "overwrit[ing] to an incredible degree" and "choppy ... start-and-stop structure."

== Bibliography ==
=== Conan novels ===
- Conan the Hunter (1994)
- Conan and the Shaman's Curse (1996)
- Conan and the Grim Grey God (1996)

=== Other novels ===
- Kull the Conqueror (1997)
- Diggers (unfinished and unpublished)

=== Short fiction ===
- "10585" (1996)

== See also ==
- Conan the Barbarian
