= Leonard Carpenter =

American fantasy and science fiction writer (born 1948)

- Born: February 6, 1948 (age 78); Chicago, Illinois, U.S.
- Occupation: Author
- Writing career
- Genres: Fantasy, science fiction
- Website: lencarpenter.com

Leonard Paul Carpenter (born February 6, 1948) is an American writer of fantasy and science fiction. He writes as Leonard Carpenter and Leonard P. Carpenter.

== Life ==
Carpenter was born in 1948 in Chicago, but aside from a year in West Texas in childhood has lived most of his life in California. He married Cheryl Lynn Chrisman on October 10, 1970, in Alameda, California. They attended UC Berkeley, from which they both graduated, and had two daughters and a son. The Carpenters lived in Santa Maria, California from 1975 to 2003, and continued to reside on the California Central Coast thereafter. Cheryl, a schoolteacher, retired in 2013 and died January 24, 2014, after a year-long fight with cancer. Since her death Carpenter has traveled and worked on book projects.

== Works ==
Among Carpenter's works are eleven Conan novels published by Tor Books. He has also written the science fiction novel Fatal Strain, later re-titled Biohacker, the historical fiction novel Lusitania Lost, and a number of short stories, articles and poems.

Carpenter's writing has been published in the magazines Amazing Stories, Asimov's Science Fiction, Eldrich Tales, and 2AM, as well as the anthologies Dark Lessons (1985), L. Ron Hubbard Presents Writers of the Future Volume I (1985), The Year's Best Horror Stories XIV (1986), Horrorstory Volume 5 (1989), The Year's Best Horror Stories: XVII (1989), Short Sharp Shocks (1990), The Cthulhu Cycle (1996), Serve It Forth — Cooking With Anne McCaffrey (1996), L. Ron Hubbard Presents Writers of the Future Volume XV (1999), and L. Ron Hubbard Presents the Best of Writers of the Future (2000).

== Awards ==
Carpenter has been the recipient of the Writers of the Future award and the Origins Award for Best Game Related Fiction.

== Bibliography ==
=== Conan novels ===
- Conan the Renegade (1986)
- Conan the Raider (1986)
- Conan the Warlord (1988)
- Conan the Hero (1989)
- Conan the Great (1989)
- Conan the Outcast (1991)
- Conan the Savage (1992)
- Conan of the Red Brotherhood (1993)
- Conan, Scourge of the Bloody Coast (1994)
- Conan the Gladiator (1995)
- Conan, Lord of the Black River (1996)

=== Other ===
- Fatal Strain (2003 - electronic publication only)
- Biohacker (2020) (Re-issue of Fatal Strain)
- Lusitania Lost (2017)
- The Chronicles of Creighton Craven (unpublished)

=== Short stories ===
- "Dead Week" (1984)
- "The Ebbing" (1985)
- "Endangered Species" (1985)
- "Fearing's Fall" (1987)
- "Recrudescence" (1988)
- "The Eighth Plague" (1989)
- "The Hagen Project" (1990)
- "Torso" (1991)

=== Poetry ===
- "The Devourer" (1987)
- "The Egg" (1987)
- "The Fungoid Intruder" (1987)
- "The Priests" (1987)
- "The Combatants" (1988)
- "The Catcher" (1989)
- "The Hoard" (1989)
- "The Miser" (1989)

=== Nonfiction ===
- "Rondrini's Linguini and Clam Sauce" (1996)
