= Roland J. Green =

American novelist (1944–2021)

Roland James Green
- Born: September 2, 1944; Bradford, Pennsylvania, United States
- Died: April 21, 2021 (aged 76)
- Occupation: Author
- Spouse: Frieda A. Murray (1975–2021)
- Writing career
- Genres: Science fiction, fantasy

Roland James Green (September 2, 1944 - April 20, 2021) was an American science fiction and fantasy writer and editor. He wrote as Roland Green and Roland J. Green; and had 28 books in the Richard Blade series published under the pen name 'Jeffrey Lord'.

== Biography ==
Green was born in Bradford, Pennsylvania, in 1944. A resident of Michigan since 1947, he was graduated from Ypsilanti High School in Ypsilanti in 1962. He received a B.A. from Oberlin College in 1966 in Political Science, then moved to Chicago to attend the University of Chicago from which he received an MA in International Politics in 1968. While there, he became active in science fiction fandom and in the Society for Creative Anachronism (under the persona "Roland de Tour Gris"). He married fellow writer Frieda A. Murray in 1975; their one daughter Violette Y. Green was born in 1984.

Green worked as a full-time writer and reviewer most of the time since selling his first novel, Wandor's Ride, in 1973. While his earliest published novels were the "Wandor" sword and sorcery series, Green's most prominent works are his military action adventures of the future, including the Starcruiser Shenandoah series, the Peace Company series, and Voyage to Eneh (2003). He also wrote a number of Conan novels published by Tor Books and co-authored several novels as well. He pseudonymously wrote all but one of the Richard Blade series books from number 9 up to the end of the series.

Roland Green died on April 20, 2021, in Chicago, Illinois, United States.
