= Don D'Ammassa =

American novelist

- Born: April 24, 1946 (age 80); Providence, Rhode Island, U.S.
- Occupations: Critic, author
- Writing career
- Genres: Fantasy, science fiction, horror
- Website: Official website

Donald Eugene D'Ammassa (born April 24, 1946) is an American fantasy, science fiction and horror critic and author. He is chiefly known for his numerous reviews, written over a period of more than thirty years. He writes as Don D'Ammassa.

== Writing career ==
D'Ammassa first made a name for himself as a fan writer in the 1970s; he was nominated for the Hugo Award for Best Fan Writer for 1976, 1977, 1978, and 1986, and his fanzine Mythologies was nominated for the Hugo Award for Best Fanzine for 1977 and 1985. His career as both critic and professional author began in the early 1980s. A long-time reviewer for Science Fiction Chronicle, his reviews have also appeared in other venues, and many are compiled on his website Critical Mass. According to John Clute, his assessments are "noted for ... fairness and generosity, and for the extremely wide range of texts he has covered." His broad knowledge of speculative and adventure fiction are reflected in his Encyclopedia of Science Fiction (2005), Encyclopedia of Fantasy and Horror Fiction (2006) and Encyclopedia of Adventure Fiction (2009).

As a short story writer D'Ammassa has produced a substantial body of horror stories and relatively fewer science fiction and fantasy tales. His longer works are more evenly divided between these genres. His more recent novels "convey a sense that he is systematically traversing the worlds of twentieth century sf in order to pay tribute from a more recent perspective to the worlds and modes typical of the form."

== Bibliography ==
=== Series ===
==== Sandor Dyle ====
- Scarab (2004)
- Narcissus (2007)

==== Wanda Coyne ====
- The Maltese Gargoyle (2015)
- The Hippogriff of the Baskervilles (2016)
- Ten Little Homunculi (2017)
- The 39 Adepts (2019)
- Murder on the Oracle Express (2023)

=== Other novels ===
- Blood Beast (1988; rewritten as The Gargoyle (2011))
- Servants of Chaos (2002)
- Haven (2004)
- Dead of Winter (2007)
- The Kaleidoscope (2015)
- The Sinking Island (2015)
- Caverns of Chaos (2015)
- Living Things (2015)
- Perilous Pursuits (2015)
- Wormdance (2015)
- Carbon Copies (2015)
- Multiplicity (2015)

=== Collections ===
- Translation Station (2011)
- That Way Madness Lies (2015)
- Little Evils (2015)
- Passing Death (2015)
- Elaborate Lies: Tales of Fantasy (2015)
- Date with the Dark (2015)
- Sandcastles (2015)
- The Devil Is in the Details (2015)
- Alien & Otherwise (2015)
- Shadows Over R'lyeh (2015)
- Phantom of the Space Opera (2015)
- More Shadows Over R'lyeh (2017)
- The Retro Collection (2017)
- Still More Shadows Over R'Lyeh (2019)
- Translation Station & Other Stories (2020)

=== Short stories ===
- "Automatic Success" (1982)
- "Love Charm" (1985)
- "The Hatchetman" (1989)
- "Literally Speaking" (1990)
- "Little Evils" (1991)
- "Strange Developments" (1991)
- "The Guard Tower" (1991)
- "The Splicer" (1991)
- "Wake Up Call" (1991)
- "Shadow Over R'lyeh" (1991)
- "Context" (1992)
- "The Dead Beat Society" (1992)
- "Homework" (1992)
- "Cleansing Agent" (1993)
- "Friday Nights at Home" (1993)
- "Puppets" (1993)
- "Subterrine - Or 20,000 Leagues under the Soil" (1993)
- "The Daylight Vampire" (1993)
- "The Spirit of Mars" (1993)
- "Forever in My Thoughts" (1993)
- "Moloch's Furnace" (1993)
- "Payment in Arrears" (1993)
- "Passing Death" (1993)
- "Corruption in Office" (1993)
- "The Library of Lost Art" (1993)
- "Shadow and Substance" (1993)
- "Frontier Spirit" (1994)
- "Inspiration" (1994)
- "Jack the Martian" (1994)
- "Misadventures in the Skin Trade" (1994)
- "The Kaleidoscope" (1994)
- "A Tight Situation" (1994)
- "A Noteworthy Affair" (1994)
- "All Flesh is Clay" (1995)
- "Coming Attractions" (1995)
- "Escape" (1995)
- "Hair Apparent" (1995)
- "Misapprehensions" (1995)
- "Next-Door Neighbor" (1995)
- "Present in Spirit" (1995)
- "The Dunwich Gate" (1995)
- "The Houseguest" (1995)
- "The Knight of Greenwich Village" (1995)
- "The Phantom of the Space Opera" (1995)
- "Twisted Images" (1995)
- "The Best of Company" (1995)
- "Actual Mode" (1995)
- "Empirical Facts" (1996)
- "Translation Station" (1996)
- "Sneak Thief" (1996)
- "Orwell's Other Nightmare" (1996)
- "The Potpourri Plot" (1996)
- "Thoracic Park" (1996)
- "Milk-Curdling Horror" (1996)
- "Kites" (1996)
- "Dark Providence" (1997)
- "Expectations" (1997)
- "Getting with the Program" (1997)
- "Restoring Order" (1997)
- "Remnants" (1997)
- "Bad Soil" (1997)
- "The Managansett Horror" (1997)
- "Adding It Up" (1998)
- "Scylla and Charybdis" (1998)
- "Leave Me Alone" (1998)
- "Bad Feelings" (1998)
- "Candid Camera" (1998)
- "Immortal Muse" (1998)
- "Stakeout" (1998)
- "The Chindi" (1998)
- "The Piggy Bank" (1998)
- "The Predator" (1998)
- "Cat Eye's" (1998)
- "Prey for the Dead" (1998)
- "Dominion" (1999)
- "Dumb Genius" (1999)
- "The Intrusion" (1999)
- "The Karma Sutra" (1999)
- "Realizations" (1999)
- "Wormdance" (1999)
- "Dark Paris" (2000)
- "The Devil Is in the Details" (2000)
- "Something in Common" (2001)
- "Departure Delayed" (2001)
- "The Black Rose" (2002)
- "A Good Offense" (2003)
- "Curing Agent" (2003)
- "Dealing with Stress" (2003)
- "The Word Mill" (2003)
- "Parting Shot" (2004)
- "The Man who Walked to Procyon" (2004)
- "Growing Old Together" (2004)
- "Fore-Thought" (2004)
- "Diplomatic Relations" (2006)
- "The Natural World" (2008)
- "No Problem" (2008)
- "Funeral Party" (2009)
- "Hearts of Stone" (2009)
- "Complexity" (2009)
- "Duck and Cover" (2009)
- "Slipstream Fiction" (2010)
- "Piecemaker" (2010)
- "No Distance Too Great" (2010)
- "Chronic Pain" (2011)
- "Dead Reckoning" (2011)
- "Farm on the Down" (2011)
- "Remotely Possible" (2011)
- "Scrimshaw" (2011)
- "The Incorruptible" (2011)
- "Misprints" (2011)
- "Martyrs" (2011)
- "Housebound" (2011)
- "The Buddy System" (2011)
- "The Last Demon" (2012)
- "Echoes" (2013)
- "Pre-Pirates" (2013)
- "City Girl" (2015)
- "The Guest House" (2015)
- "Night Duty" (2015)
- "The New Guy" (2015)
- "The Thing in the Library" (2015)
- "Border Town" (2017)
- "Lost Canyon" (2017)
- "Shell Games" (2017)
- "The Bad Neighbor" (2017)
- "The Key" (2017)
- "The Old Place" (2017)
- "The Warden of the Wall" (2017)
- "The Well Being" (2017)
- "Wendy" (2017)
- "Creepy Hollow" (2017)
- "Invaders from the Unknown" (2017)
- "It Came from Out There" (2017)
- "Mission to the Red Planet" (2017)
- "The Altered Astronaut" (2017)
- "The Anomaly" (2017)
- "The Day the World Dissolved" (2017)
- "The Red Hornet" (2017)
- "Isn't Life Great?" (2017)
- "The Chaos Business" (2019)
- "The Custodian" (2019)
- "The Effigy" (2019)
- "The Thin Spot" (2019)
- "The Three Pale Men" (2019)
- "Twisted" (2019)
- "The Birdwatchers" (2024)

=== Nonfiction ===
- Architects of Tomorrow: Volume I (2015)
- Architects of Tomorrow: Volume II (2016)
- Architects of Tomorrow: Volume III (2017)
- Architects of Tomorrow: Volume IV (2019)
- Architects of Tomorrow: Volume V (2019)
- Architects of Tomorrow: Volume VI (2020)
- Architects of Tomorrow: Volume VII (2021)
- Architects of Tomorrow: Volume VIII (2022)
- Architects of Tomrrow: Volume IX (2024)
- Architects of Tomrrow: Volume X (2024)
- Architects of Tomrrow: Volume XI (2026)
- Encyclopedia of Adventure Fiction (2009)
- Encyclopedia of Fantasy and Horror Fiction (2006)
- Encyclopedia of Science Fiction (2005)
- Masters of Adventure: Volume I (2016)
- Masters of Adventure: Volume II (2020)
- Masters of Adventure: Volume III (2021)
- Masters of Adventure: Volume IV (2024)
- Masters of Adventure: Volume V (2026)
- Masters of Detection: Volume I (2015)
- Masters of Detection: Volume II (2015)
- Masters of Detection: Volume III (2015)
- Masters of Detection: Volume IV (2017)
- Masters of Detection: Volume V (2018)
- Masters of Detection: Volume VI (2019)
- Masters of Detection: Volume VII (2019)
- Masters of Detection: Volume VIII (2022)
- Masters of Detection: Volume IX (2024)
- Masters of Detection: Volume X (2024)
- Masters of Detection: Volume XI (2026)
- Masters of Fantasy (2018)
- Masters of Fantasy: Volume 2 (2020)
- Masters of Fantasy: Volume III (2022)
- Masters of Horror: Volume I (2016)
- Masters of Horror: Volume II (2017)
- Masters of Horror: Volume III (2019)
- Masters of Horror: Volume IV (2022)
- Masters of Horror: Volume V (2024)
- Masters of Horror: Volume VI (2026)
- Not Exactly a Memoir (2017)
