= The Treasure of Tranicos (collection) =

1980 collection of a short story and essays by Robert E. Howard and L. Sprague de Camp

- Cover of first edition
- Author: Robert E. Howard; L. Sprague de Camp
- Illustrator: Esteban Maroto
- Cover artist: Sanjulián
- Language: English
- Series: Conan the Barbarian
- Genre: Sword and sorcery
- Publisher: Ace Books
- Publication date: 1980
- Publication place: United States
- Media type: Print (Paperback)
- Pages: 191 pp
- ISBN: 0-441-82245-2
- OCLC: 7467063

The Treasure of Tranicos is a 1980 collection of a fantasy short story and essays by American writers Robert E. Howard and L. Sprague de Camp featuring Howard's sword and sorcery hero Conan the Barbarian; the essays by de Camp are on the title story and on Howard. The book is illustrated by Esteban Maroto.

The title story was revised by de Camp from the original version by Howard and was first published as "The Black Stranger" in Fantasy Magazine for February, 1953. It subsequently appeared in the collections King Conan (Gnome Press, 1953) and Conan the Usurper (Lancer Books, 1967).

== Contents ==
- "Introduction" (L. Sprague de Camp)
- "The Treasure of Tranicos" (Robert E. Howard and L. Sprague de Camp)
- "The Trail of Tranicos" (L. Sprague de Camp)
- "Skald in the Post Oaks" (L. Sprague de Camp)

== Plot summary ==
=== "The Treasure of Tranicos" ===
The title story begins with Conan in the Pictish Wilderness, fleeing native warriors who are now hunting him. To escape his pursuers, Conan climbs a nearby hill. Suddenly, he sees the Picts inexplicably abandon their chase and turn back. Soon, Conan realizes this spot must be a forbidden place to the Picts. The hill turns out to hold a treasure cave, along with the preserved bodies of a pirate captain, Tranicos, and his crew. Eventually, the treasure draws others towards the forbidden cave in their quest for it — one Count Valenso, and both Zingaran and Barachan sea reavers. But the bane of Tranicos is quite ready to take new victims, and Conan must outmaneuver all of them if he is to claim the riches.

Howard's original story pointed toward a new nautical career for Conan; one of de Camp's major changes was to make it lead instead into the revolution that would bring the Cimmerian to the throne of Aquilonia.

=== "The Trail of Tranicos" ===
The essay following the story relates the circumstances of de Camp's discovery of Howard's manuscript and his revision and publication of it.

=== "Scald in the Post Oaks" ===
The remaining essay is about Howard himself.

== Sources ==
- Laughlin, Charlotte; Daniel J. H. Levack (1983). De Camp: An L. Sprague de Camp Bibliography. San Francisco: Underwood/Miller. p. 97.
