= A Witch Shall be Born =

Conan novella by Robert E. Howard

"A Witch Shall Be Born"
- Short story by Robert E. Howard
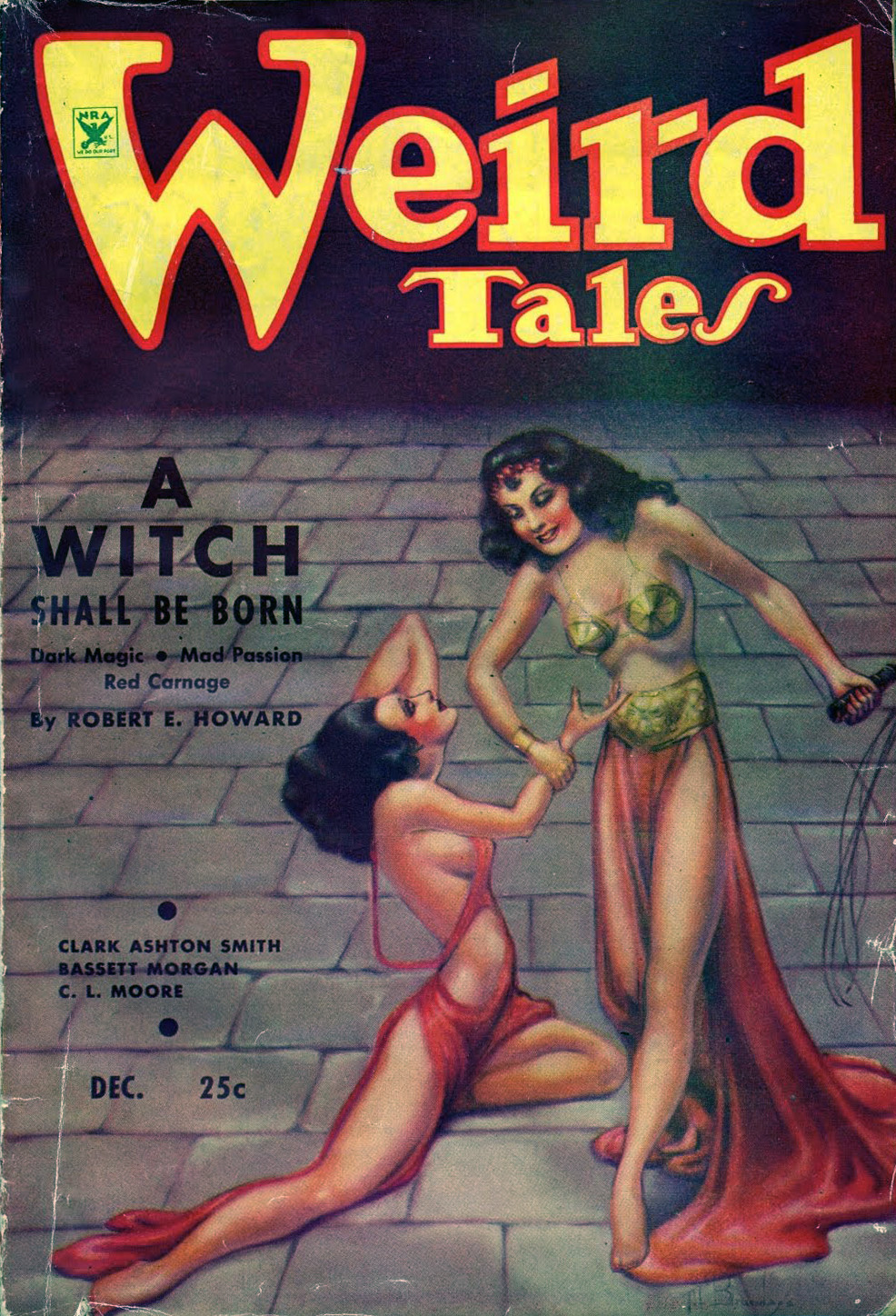
- Cover of Weird Tales, December 1934. Art by Margaret Brundage

Text available at Wikisource
- Country: United States
- Language: English
- Genre: Fantasy

Publication
- Published in: Weird Tales
- Publication type: Periodical
- Publisher: Rural Publishing Corporation
- Media type: Pulp magazine
- Publication date: December 1934

Chronology
- Series: Conan the Cimmerian
The People of the Black Circle	Jewels of Gwahlur

"A Witch Shall Be Born" is a sword and sorcery novella by American writer Robert E. Howard, featuring his character Conan the Cimmerian. It was written in only a few days in spring of 1934 and first published in Weird Tales in December 1934. A book edition was published in 1975 by Donald M. Grant, Publisher with illustrations by Alicia Austin.

The story concerns a witch replacing her twin sister as queen of a city-state, which brings her into conflict with Conan who had been the captain of the queen's guard. Themes of paranoia, and the duality of the twin sisters, are paramount in this story but it also includes elements of the conflict between barbarism and civilization that is common to the entire Conan series. The novella as a whole is considered an average example of the series, but one scene stands out. Conan's crucifixion early in the story during the second chapter ("The Tree of Death") is considered one of the most memorable scenes in the entire series. A variation of this scene was included in the 1982 film Conan the Barbarian with Arnold Schwarzenegger.

In the story, the witch Salome is part of a family line of witches. Salome's words at the beginning – "'Every century a witch shall be born.' So ran the ancient curse. And so it has come to pass. Each was named Salome. I too am Salome. It was always Salome, the witch. It will always be Salome, the witch, even when the mountains of ice have roared down from the pole and ground the civilizations to ruin, and a new world has risen from the ashes and dust—even then there shall be Salomes to walk the earth, to trap men's hearts by their sorcery, to dance before the kings of the world, and see the heads of the wise men fall at their pleasure" – Howard implies that the witch Salome of this story is an earlier incarnation of the notorious Salome of the New Testament, who instigated the beheading of John the Baptist.

== Plot ==
Queen Taramis of Khauran awakens one day to find her identical twin sister, Salome, staring her in the face. As an infant, Salome was deemed a witch due to a crescent-shaped birthmark on her chest. This birthmark was believed to be a sign of evil, so she was left in the desert to die. However, a magician from Khitai (China) found Salome, brought her up, and instructed her in the art of sorcery.

Salome has conspired with a voivode named Constantius, also known as "The Falcon", the Kothic leader for an army of Shemitish mercenaries, to take over the city of Khauran. Queen Taramis is sent to the palace dungeon, to be tortured and raped by the Falcon. Salome assumes Taramis' identity as the queen of Khauran and names Constantius her royal consort. The Khaurani army is disbanded and replaced by Constantius' Shemitish mercenaries, an event which turns violent when the captain of the queen's guard, Conan the Cimmerian, refuses to obey Salome's order.

After putting his back against a wall while killing a number of Constantius' warriors, Conan is finally captured and crucified for his defiance. Olgerd Vladislav, the Zaporoskan leader of a band of Zuagir desert raiders, is riding by with his scouting party and discovers a crucified Conan a mile outside the city walls. Vladislav doesn't entirely help Conan. He has the base of the cross cut, leaving it to fate and Conan's hardiness that he isn't crushed by the heavy wood. Vladislav then refuses to give Conan any water, claiming the Cimmerian must wait until after a ten-mile trek towards their outlaw camp to prove himself worthy of his band.

In Khauran, Salome's reign as "Taramis" has plunged the city into ruin. Citizens are killed, tortured, or sold as slaves; heavy taxes are imposed; and women are frequently debauched by the Shemites. Salome desecrates the temple of Ishtar in the center of her city and summons a demon, Thaug, to live inside it. Soon, the citizens of Khauran are routinely sacrificed to Thaug.

Conan has been expanding the numbers of Zuagirs as Vladislav's lieutenant, while also secretly establishing communication with some Khaurani Knights who had become refugees. When he has a sufficient force, Conan deposes Vladislav's leadership of the Zuagirs, but doesn't kill him in repayment for Vladislav having saved his life from the cross. Soon, Conan fakes the construction of siege engines with palm trees and painted silk. Constantius is fooled by this as his scouts cannot get close enough to see them properly and Conan is known for his experience in all manner of warfare. The Shemitish mercenaries ride out of their city for an open-field battle, with Constantius expecting only the lightly armed Zuagirs, but are taken by surprise by the Khaurani cavalry hidden amongst them. Conan's forces are victorious, ruthlessly taking no prisoners. The Zuagirs, Shemite nomads, are hereditary enemies of the Western Shemite city dwellers from whom Constantius' mercenaries were drawn, while the Khaurani exiles are full of bitterness over the Shemites' oppression of their city; neither are inclined to be merciful to their defeated enemies.

Meanwhile, Valerius, a former member of the Khaurani army, has discovered the secret of Salome's masquerade, and the fact that Salome is holding the real Taramis within her dungeon. With Conan's forces approaching Khauran, Valerius plans to rescue Taramis and reveal the conspiracy to his people or to escape with the true queen. Conan's victory is not certain to the Khauranis and they are nervous about his intentions if he does take Khauran. When it becomes apparent that Conan has defeated Constantius' Shemites, Salome decides to kill Taramis before his army can reclaim the city. She thwarts Valerius' rescue attempt and takes Taramis to the former temple of Ishtar to sacrifice her to Thaug. Valerius saves Taramis and kills Salome, but not before she unleashes Thaug. Conan arrives with his Khaurani allies and some Zuagir warriors, who kill the demon with two flights of arrows.

Soon, Taramis offers to make Conan her royal councillor and captain. However, he declines the queen's offer and nominates Valerius instead. Conan, as chief of the Zuagirs, drives away the remaining Shemites (capturing Constantius in the process) and leaves to raid the nearby kingdom of Turan. Before leaving Khauran, he crucifies Constantius at the site where he'd been crucified, commenting with irony to a crucified Constantius the difference between their respective situations: "I hung there on a cross as you are hanging, and I lived, thanks to circumstances and a stamina peculiar to barbarians. But you civilized men are soft; your lives are not nailed to your spines as are ours. Your fortitude consists mainly in inflicting torment, not in enduring it. You will be dead before sundown. And so, Falcon, I leave you to the companionship of another bird of the desert."

Salome's words at the beginning – "'Every century a witch shall be born.' So ran the ancient curse. And so it has come to pass. Each was named Salome. I too am Salome. It was always Salome, the witch. It will always be Salome, the witch, even when the mountains of ice have roared down from the pole and ground the civilizations to ruin, and a new world has risen from the ashes and dust—even then there shall be Salomes to walk the earth, to trap men's hearts by their sorcery, to dance before the kings of the world, and see the heads of the wise men fall at their pleasure" – imply that the witch Salome of this story is an earlier incarnation of the notorious Salome of the New Testament, who instigated the beheading of John the Baptist.

== Style ==
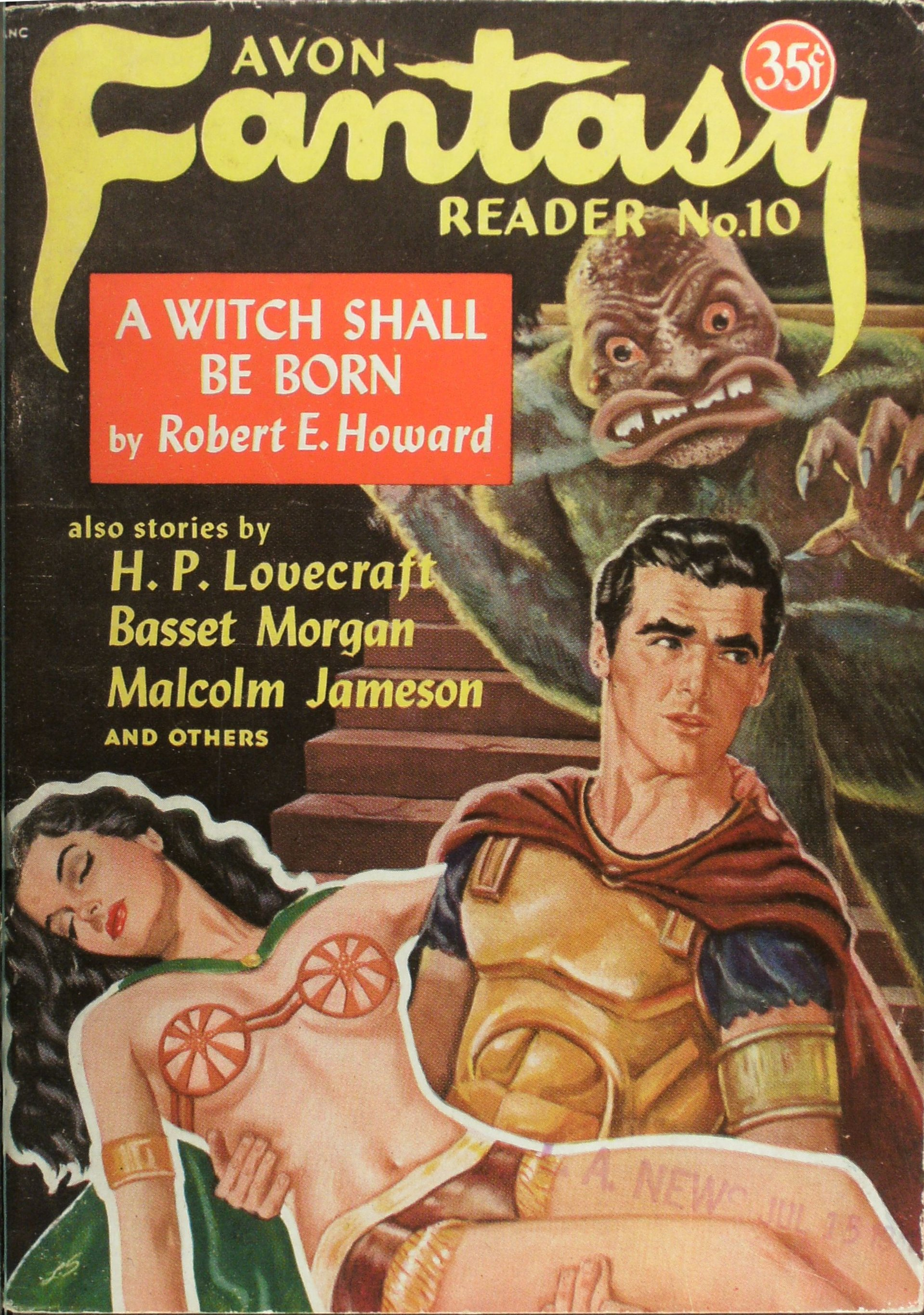
Cover of Avon Fantasy Reader #10 (1949). The first reprinting of the story. Unknown artist.

A theme of paranoia runs through the story. Howard uses a theme common to his works in having evil hide behind innocent features. Similarly, Vladislav is unaware of Conan's plans until it's too late. Of all the characters, only Conan is aware of all the facts. The twin sisters, Taramis and Salome, are an instance of Howard's interest in siblings and the theme of duality, which appeared in several other works.

Howard may have been experimenting with style in this novella, leaving behind any standard pulp formula. Conan dominates the story, but he is only actually present in two chapters. The narrative instead builds the plot by following others, such as Valerius, Salome, and a wandering savant named Astreas.

Louinet suggests that Conan becomes figuratively immortal and superhuman following his crucifixion: "How can anybody kill a character—literarily or literally—who can survive such a scene as that one?"

The supernatural elements of the story are minor and may only have been included to justify publication in Weird Tales. The demon Thaug is similar to that in Howard's unfinished novel Almuric, which he had abandoned only a few months before starting this story. The quick reveal and defeat of the demon may indicate that Howard was embarrassed by its inclusion.

The ongoing theme of Barbarism vs. Civilization, which pervades the entire Conan series, is present in this story in two crucifixions. Conan is able to endure and survive his crucifixion, as well as the subsequent journey without water, thanks to his barbarian stamina. When Constantius is finally crucified, Conan states "You are more fit to inflict torture than endure it. ... You civilized men are soft; your lives are not nailed to your spines as ours."

== Background ==
This story was written in late May or early June 1934. Farnsworth Wright, editor of Weird Tales, was running out of Conan stories which were growing in popularity and attracting new readers to the magazine. Howard had recently finished the Conan novel The Hour of the Dragon, which was not intended for publication in Weird Tales and the story previous to that, "The People of the Black Circle", was already scheduled for August. He finished "A Witch Shall Be Born" in only two drafts over a period of days in order to meet this deadline. Wright accepted it without hesitation, telling Howard it was his best Conan story to date, and made it the cover story for the December issue.

== Reception ==
Howard scholar Patrice Louinet refers to this as a rather forgettable Conan story but one that contains the most memorable scene of the entire series: Conan's crucifixion at the hands of Constantius. He goes on to say that, while of average quality, it "exudes Howard's confidence in his creation."

Robert Weinberg concurs, mentioning the "best scene in the entire Conan series", but comments that the remainder of the story is only average. Of the crucifixion, Weinberg writes, "Only Howard could have given the scene life." He states that this scene, the "blood and passion", is an indicator of why Howard is better than any of his imitators. The violence is "graphic and elemental" while the torture "barbaric, primitive and real" not allowing the hero a chance to escape. Instead, Conan survives by sheer endurance, even killing an overeager vulture with his teeth. The passion in the text and strength of the prose suspends disbelief in Conan's survival on the cross. However, Weinberg criticizes the fact that much of the action takes place offstage, for instance, being related to the reader through a letter from the otherwise unseen Astreas or through a priest communicating with Salome.

On the same subject, Rev. Austin Spencer noted that: "The Crucifixion of Jesus has left a deep mark on all members of Western culture, regardless of whether or not one be a Christian believer. Robert E. Howard is certainly no exception. (...) When I was preparing the present volume, a colleague drew my attention to A Witch Shall be Born. I was both impressed and appalled by Howard's achievement - creating a full-fledged Pagan counterpart and total antithesis to the New Testament account. (...) The crucified Conan does not feel forsaken by his god, Crom. This god, Crom, offers neither physical deliverance not spiritual solace - he merely endows Cimmerians with enormous strength and tenacity to fight. Conan, killing a vulture with his teeth while pinioned to the cross, is a true votary of his savage god. There are no thieves crucified at Conan's side - the thieves remove him from the cross in exchange for his joining their thievery. (...) Conan does not forgive his enemies, and certainly does not ask Crom to do so; he takes direct and ruthless revenge. For Conan, the rule is simple and straightforward - "Crucify Or Be Crucified". (...) One need not take literally the grim tribal god on his mountain to recognize in today's America the votaries and prophets of Crom, who would take spiritual guidance from the Crucifixion of Conan rather than the Crucifixion of Jesus".

== Publication history ==
The story was first published in the December 1934 issue of Weird Tales. The first reprint followed in 1949, when the story was published in the digest anthology Avon Fantasy Reader #10. The novella was the cover story and main feature of both publications.

A version of the story that was edited and altered by L. Sprague de Camp appeared in the collection Conan the Barbarian (Gnome Press, 1954). This was reprinted several times, including the collection Conan the Freebooter (Lancer Books, 1968). It was first published by itself in book form by Donald M. Grant, Publisher, Inc., titled A Witch Shall Be Born, in 1975, which did not use the de Camp version.

The novella has more recently been published in the collections The Conan Chronicles Volume 1: The People of the Black Circle (Gollancz, 2000), The Bloody Crown of Conan (Del Rey, 2005). It was selected by John Clute as part of the Penguin Modern Classics collection Heroes in the Wind (Penguin Books, 2009). All versions used pure-Howard texts with de Camp's alterations excised.

== Adaptations ==
The story was adapted for comic books by Roy Thomas and John Buscema in Savage Sword of Conan #5 (1975). The crucifixion scene was adapted for the first Conan film, Conan the Barbarian (1982). The original script for the film, written by Oliver Stone, was based on this novella and another Conan story, "Black Colossus", and re-set in a post-apocalyptic future. When John Milius took over directing the film, he had the script changed but retained the crucifixion scene, described by Kenneth Von Gunden as "Howard's quintessential Conan scene: the mighty Cimmerian, hanging on a cross, nails driven through his hands and feet, tearing out the throat of a vulture which comes to peck out his eyes."

The name "Queen Taramis" was also used in the second Conan movie, Conan the Destroyer (1984), played by actress Sarah Douglas. The mark of Salome also appears in this film, with the character Jehnna, but it is not used in the same way.

Another comic book adaptation was done in 2015-2016 by Fred Van Lente and Brian Ching in Conan the Avenger #20-25.

In 2021, Kronan, the eleventh volume of the comic book series Orcs et Gobelins, transposes the events of A Witch Shall Be Born into the French shared fantasy universe of Le Monde d'Aquilon. Inspired by the short story by Robert E. Howard, originally featuring the character of Conan the Barbarian, the album reinterprets the narrative through the darker, morally ambiguous lens of the Orcs et Gobelins saga. The plot explores themes of usurpation, sorcery, and tyranny, while adapting Howard’s tale to fit Le Monde d'Aquilon’s established lore, factions, and mythological structure. By blending sword-and-sorcery elements with the brutal perspective characteristic of the series, the author Jean-Luc Istin offers both an homage to Howard’s original work and a distinct reinterpretation within the heroic fantasy comic book series.

Preceded by "The People of the Black Circle"	Original Howard Canon (publication order)	Succeeded by "Jewels of Gwahlur"
Preceded by "The Slithering Shadow"	Original Howard Canon (Dale Rippke chronology)	Succeeded by "The Devil in Iron"
Preceded by The People of the Black Circle	Grant Conan series (publication order)	Succeeded by The Tower of the Elephant
Preceded by "The Road of the Eagles"	Complete Conan Saga (William Galen Gray chronology)	Succeeded by "Black Tears"
