= Jewels of Gwahlur =

Conan novelette by Robert E. Howard

- Short story by Robert E. Howard
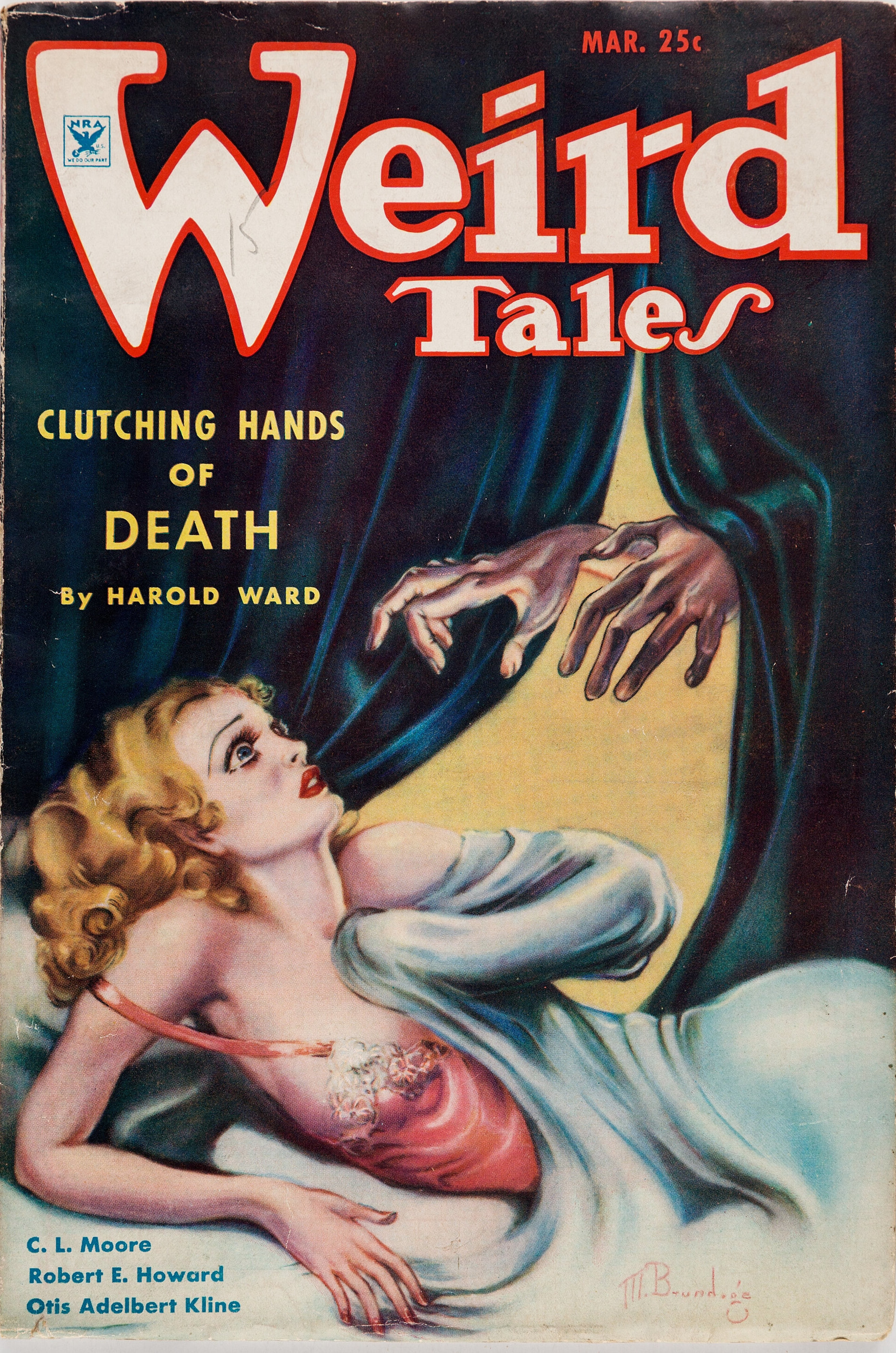
- Cover of Weird Tales, March 1935. Art by Margaret Brundage
- Original title: Servants of Bit-Yakin
- Country: United States
- Language: English
- Genre: Fantasy

Publication
- Published in: Weird Tales
- Publication type: Pulp magazine
- Publisher: Rural Publishing
- Publication date: March 1935

Chronology
- Series: Conan the Cimmerian
A Witch Shall be Born	Beyond the Black River

"Jewels of Gwahlur" is one of the original short stories starring the fictional sword and sorcery hero Conan the Cimmerian, written by American author Robert E. Howard. Set in the fictional Hyborian Age, it concerns several parties, including Conan, fighting over and treasure hunting for the eponymous treasure in Hyborian Africa. The tale was first published in the March 1935 issue of Weird Tales. Howard's original title for the story was "The Servants of Bit-Yakin".

== Plot summary ==
Robert E. Howard set his story in Hyborian Africa. The Teeth of Gwahlur are legendary jewels, kept within the ancient city of Alkmeenon, in the country of Keshan "which in itself was considered mythical by many northern and western nations".

Conan, following rumors of this treasure, journeys into Keshan and offers his services in training the local army against their rival, Punt. However, Thutmekri, a Stygian thief with similar intentions, and his Shemitish partner, Zargheba, also arrive in the country with an offer for a military alliance with another of Punt's neighbors, Zembabwei, with some of the Teeth to seal their pact. The high priest of Keshan, Gorulga, announces that a decision on the matter can only be made after consulting with Yelaya, the mummified oracle of Alkmeenon. This is all the treasure hunters require. Conan and Zargheba (independently of each other) travel to the city ahead of Gorulga's expedition.

In the abandoned city, an initial atmosphere of the supernatural gives way to intrigue over the oracle. Zargheba has brought along a Corinthian slave girl, Muriela, to play the role of Yelaya and tell the priests to give some of their jewels to Thutmekri (he needed them to prove that the treasure was real, and then planned to invade and take the rest of the jewels). Conan is at first frightened by the living oracle, but quickly discovers the ruse. Intrigue and mystery follows as the imposter and the body of the genuine oracle switch roles. Gorulga, however, is innocent in this, genuinely attempting to consult his oracle.

However, a fourth faction quickly appears. A Pelishti traveller, Bit-Yakin, had visited the valley where Alkmeenon is located centuries ago. When the natives of Keshan visited the site to worship Yelaya as a goddess, Bit-Yakin provided prophecies from a nearby cave. Eventually, he died there; his undying servants buried him as per his instructions and, free of their master's control, brutally slaughtered any priests from Keshan who attempted to visit the city to consult with Yelaya. Bit-Yakin's servants, revealed to be large gray-haired apes, kill Gorulga's party after they attempt to claim the jewels. Conan manages to acquire the chest containing the jewels, but is forced to abandon his prize so he could rescue Muriela. The two escape together and Conan ends his adventure by outlining a new plan.

== Characters and places ==
Several parts of the story highlight Conan's intellect, in particular his grasp of written and spoken languages: "In his roaming about the world the giant adventurer had picked up a wide smattering of knowledge, particularly including the speaking and reading of many alien tongues. Many a sheltered scholar would have been astonished at the Cimmerian's linguistic abilities, for he had experienced many adventures where knowledge of a strange language had meant the difference between life and death." Conan's polyglottery is also a plot point in Robert E. Howard's only Conan novel, The Hour of the Dragon, while his literacy and knowledge were noted in the very first Conan story, "The Phoenix on the Sword".

The ending emphasizes Conan's chivalry and his strong tendency to save damsels in distress. Being able to save either Muriela or the chest of priceless gems which he spent months in seeking, and only seconds to make a choice, Conan without hesitation chooses to save the girl and let the treasure be irrevocably lost.

The original Conan stories are ambiguous with regard to whether the various gods truly exist. In "Black Colossus" Mitra is quite real and unequivocally manifests himself to those who come to his shrine; conversely, in the present story all "manifestations" of the goddess are nothing but cynical frauds.

The Conan stories take place in a fictional past, known as the Hyborian Age, but based on real places. The main country of Keshan takes its name from "Kesh", the Egyptian name for Nubia. Their enemy, the Land of Punt, has a similar Egyptian origin. The other nation, Zembabwei, takes its name from the ruins of Great Zimbabwe (as did the real-world country Zimbabwe 45 years after this story was published).

== Reception ==
Fritz Leiber rated it as one of three of the worst Conan stories, which he said were "repetitious and childish, a self-vitiating brew of pseudo-science, stage illusions, and the 'genuine' supernatural."

== Reprint history ==
The collections King Conan (Gnome Press, 1953), Conan the Warrior (Lancer Books, 1967), and Jewels of Gwahlur (Grant, 1979) republished the story. It has more recently been published in the collections The Conan Chronicles Volume 2: The Hour of the Dragon (Gollancz, 2001) as "Jewels of Gwalhur" and The Conquering Sword of Conan (2005) under Howard's original title, "The Servants of Bit-Yakin".

== Adaptations ==
Roy Thomas and Dick Giordano adapted the story in Savage Sword of Conan #25 in 1977. This version places the story some time after the events of 'Red Nails', which was previously published in the same magazine. In 2008, Dark Horse Comics reprinted the story in the third volume of their collection of the magazine.

P. Craig Russell adapted the story for Dark Horse Comics in 2005 as a three issue mini-series, collected in a hardcover in 2006.

An audiobook edition was narrated by Phil Chenevert in 2013 and released by LibriVox in the public domain.

Oxford University Press has published a "graded reader" version in their "Dominoes" series.

Preceded by "A Witch Shall be Born"	Original Howard Canon (publication order)	Succeeded by "Beyond the Black River"
Preceded by "Red Nails"	Original Howard Canon (Dale Rippke chronology)	Succeeded by "Wolves Beyond the Border"
Preceded by Conan and the Gods of the Mountain	Complete Conan Saga (William Galen Gray chronology)	Succeeded by "The Ivory Goddess"
