= The Black Stranger =

Conan novella by Robert E. Howard

- Short story by Robert E. Howard
- Country: United States
- Language: English
- Genre: Fantasy

Publication
- Published in: Fantasy Magazine
- Publication type: Magazine
- Media type: Print (Magazine)
- Publication date: 1953
- Series: Conan the Barbarian

"The Black Stranger" is a fantasy short story by American writer Robert E. Howard, one of his works featuring the sword and sorcery hero Conan the Cimmerian. It was written in the 1930s, but not published in his lifetime. When the original Conan version of his story failed to find a publisher, Howard rewrote "The Black Stranger" into a piratical Terence Vulmea story entitled "Swords of the Red Brotherhood".

Howard's original Conan story was changed and rewritten by L. Sprague de Camp and published in Fantasy Magazine in February 1953 (dated March 1953 on the spine). The de Camp version was retitled "The Treasure of Tranicos" for book publication later the same year. Its first hardbound publication was in King Conan by Gnome Press, and its first paperback publication was in Conan the Usurper published by Lancer Books in 1967. It was republished together with an introduction and two non-fiction pieces on the story and on Howard by de Camp with illustrations by Esteban Maroto as The Treasure of Tranicos by Ace Books in 1980.

The Treasure of Tranicos (also known as "The Black Stranger") by Robert E. Howard and L. Sprague de Camp, Ace Books, 1980

Howard's original story was first published in 1987 in Echoes of Valor and more recently in the collections The Conan Chronicles Volume 2: The Hour of the Dragon (Gollancz, 2001) and Conan of Cimmeria: Volume Three (1935-1936) (Del Rey Books, 2005).

== Plot Summary ==
The story begins with Conan in the Pictish Wilderness, fleeing native warriors who are chasing him. To escape, Conan ascends a nearby crag of rock and the Picts inexplicably abandon their chase and turn back. Conan realizes this spot must be a forbidden place to the Picts. The crag turns out to hold a treasure cave along with the preserved bodies of the pirate captain Tranicos and his men. When Conan attempts to enter the cave, he feels like he is being choked to death.

On the nearby seacoast lies the fortress of Count Valenso of Korzetta, a noble from Zingara. The black stranger referred to in the title is a wrathful demon who had been summoned by a magician in Zingara and used by Valenso for dark deeds. Much later, the demon escaped the hell where he had been bound and began vengefully pursuing Valenso who fled to this remote place. In his entourage are his niece Belesa, a young girl named Tina and a number of retainers and servants. Valenso had also employed the sea captain Zingelito who had his own plans and knew where the legendary Treasure of Tranicos was hidden. However, Zingelito was killed by Picts shortly after they arrived.

The Count is alarmed when in short succession two pirate ships arrive. The pirates are led by a Barachan named Strom and a Zingaran called Black Zarono. The pirates are bitter enemies but both falsely believe Valenso knows about the Treasure of Tranicos. In a meeting between the three, Conan makes an appearance having made his way into the fortress by stealth. The men learn from Conan that he has discovered the treasure and would be willing to share if they help him retrieve it. They reluctantly make a thieves' pact and agree to join Conan, planning to kill him once the treasure is in their possession. Conan however, intends to trap Strom and Zarono in the cave, where they will be killed by poisonous fumes, take the treasure and sail away with the pirate crews. Conan's plan fails. When he and the pirates arrive at the crag, they are quickly surrounded by Picts and have to fight their way back to the fortress.

The tale concludes with the stronghold falling to the Picts. In the fight Strom and Zarono are killed. The demon brings about the death of Valenso, but is later vanquished by Conan. Amid the chaos, Conan, Belesa and Tina escape over the fortress wall and are later rescued aboard Strom's pirate ship.

== "The Treasure of Tranicos" ==
De Camp altered the story considerably. Some names are changed; the pirate Strom becomes "Strombanni" and Valenso's servant, Gebrello, is called "Gebellez". The vengeful demon is replaced by the Stygian wizard Thoth-amon (Note: Howard's spelling: in later Conan work usually spelled Thoth-Amon) (a character from The Phoenix on the Sword) whom Valenso had double-crossed in the past. A demon however, haunts the treasure cave who is later released by Thoth-amon to kill Valenso.

Howard's version of the story pointed toward a new piratical career for Conan; one of de Camp's major changes was to make it instead lead into the revolution that would bring the Cimmerian to the throne of Aquilonia. Conan ended up in the Pictish lands after Aquilonia's despotic King Numedides betrayed him. The Counts of Poitain arrive on the isolated shores, looking for Conan to lead them against Numedides. Tranicos' treasure would be used to finance the rebel army.

== Picts as Native Americans ==
Though set in the Hyborian Age, a fictional past around 10,000 BC, the story has many connotations of the American Frontier, about which Howard also wrote some stories. The Picts are thinly-disguised Native Americans—with feathers in their hair, wearing moccasins, and wielding tomahawks. The situation of an isolated outpost behind its palisade, in the midst of a threatening forest, which is full of these hostile Picts is familiar from numerous historical and literary depictions of the frontier. Also, Conan makes several references to his being "a white man"—a racial bond uniting him, the "barbarian", with the other "civilized" protagonists, against their common foe: the Pictish "savages".

== "Swords of the Red Brotherhood" ==
As noted above, when the original Conan version of his story failed to find a publisher, Howard re-wrote "The Black Stranger" as "Swords of the Red Brotherhood" by placing it in a historical background of 17th century America. In this version, the location is moved to the Pacific shore of Central America, and Conan becomes the Irish pirate Black Terence Vulmea. Howard regarded Conan's Cimmerians as the ancestors of the Irish people and other Celts. The exile Zingaran, Lady Belesa, becomes a French noblewoman named Francoise d'Chastillon, the rival Zingaran and Barachan pirates become respectively French and English, the Picts become Native Americans (which they already resembled in the original), and the Treasure of Tranicos becomes the Treasure of Montesuma. Another difference with the original is a reduction of the supernatural element.

In both the original and this adaptation, the Cimmerian/Irish pirate protagonist is highly chivalrous. He saves the damsel in distress at considerable risk to himself, giving her as a parting gift a fortune in gemstones; big enough to have a comfortable wealthy life in Zingara/France. He asks for no sexual favors in return.

== Reception ==
James Van Hise, reviewing the original Howard version of the story, stated that the "writing is so good that it draws you into the situations of the supporting characters with surprising ease" and added that ""The Black Stranger" achieves the powerful epic scope of the best of the Howard Conan epics".

== Adaptation ==
The de Camp version of the story was adapted by Roy Thomas and John Buscema in Savage Sword of Conan #47-48 in 1979.

== Sources ==
- Shanks, Jeffrey (2012), "Hyborian Age Archeology: Unearthing Historical and Anthropological Foundations", in Prida, Jonas (ed.), Conan Meets the Academy: Multidisciplinary Essays on the Enduring Barbarian, McFarland & Co, ISBN 978-0786461523

| Preceded by "The God in the Bowl" | Original Howard Canon (publication order) | Succeeded by "The Frost-Giant's Daughter" |
| Preceded by "Beyond the Black River" | Original Howard Canon (Dale Rippke chronology) | Succeeded by "Red Nails" |
| Preceded by "Moon of Blood" | Complete Conan Saga (William Galen Gray chronology) | Succeeded by "Wolves Beyond the Border" |
