= Conan the Barbarian (2011 collection) =

2011 short story collection by Robert E. Howard

- Conan the Barbarian by Robert E. Howard, Del Rey/Ballantine Books, 2011
- Author: Robert E. Howard
- Language: English
- Genre: Sword and sorcery Fantasy short stories
- Publisher: Del Rey/Ballantine Books
- Publication date: 2011
- Publication place: United States
- Media type: Print (paperback)
- Pages: 286
- ISBN: 978-0-345-53123-0
- OCLC: 704383280
- Dewey Decimal: 813/.52 223

Conan the Barbarian is a collection of six fantasy short stories written by Robert E. Howard featuring his seminal sword and sorcery hero of the same name, the collection was first published in paperback by Del Rey/Ballantine Books in July 2011 as a tie-in with the movie of the same title. The stories originally appeared in the 1930s in the fantasy magazine Weird Tales. An earlier collection with the same title but different contents was issued in hardcover by Gnome Press in 1955.

Contents:

- "The Phoenix on the Sword"
- "The People of the Black Circle"
- "The Tower of the Elephant"
- "Queen of the Black Coast"
- "Red Nails"
- "Rogues in the House"
