= Beyond the Black River =

Conan novella by Robert E. Howard

- Short story by Robert E. Howard
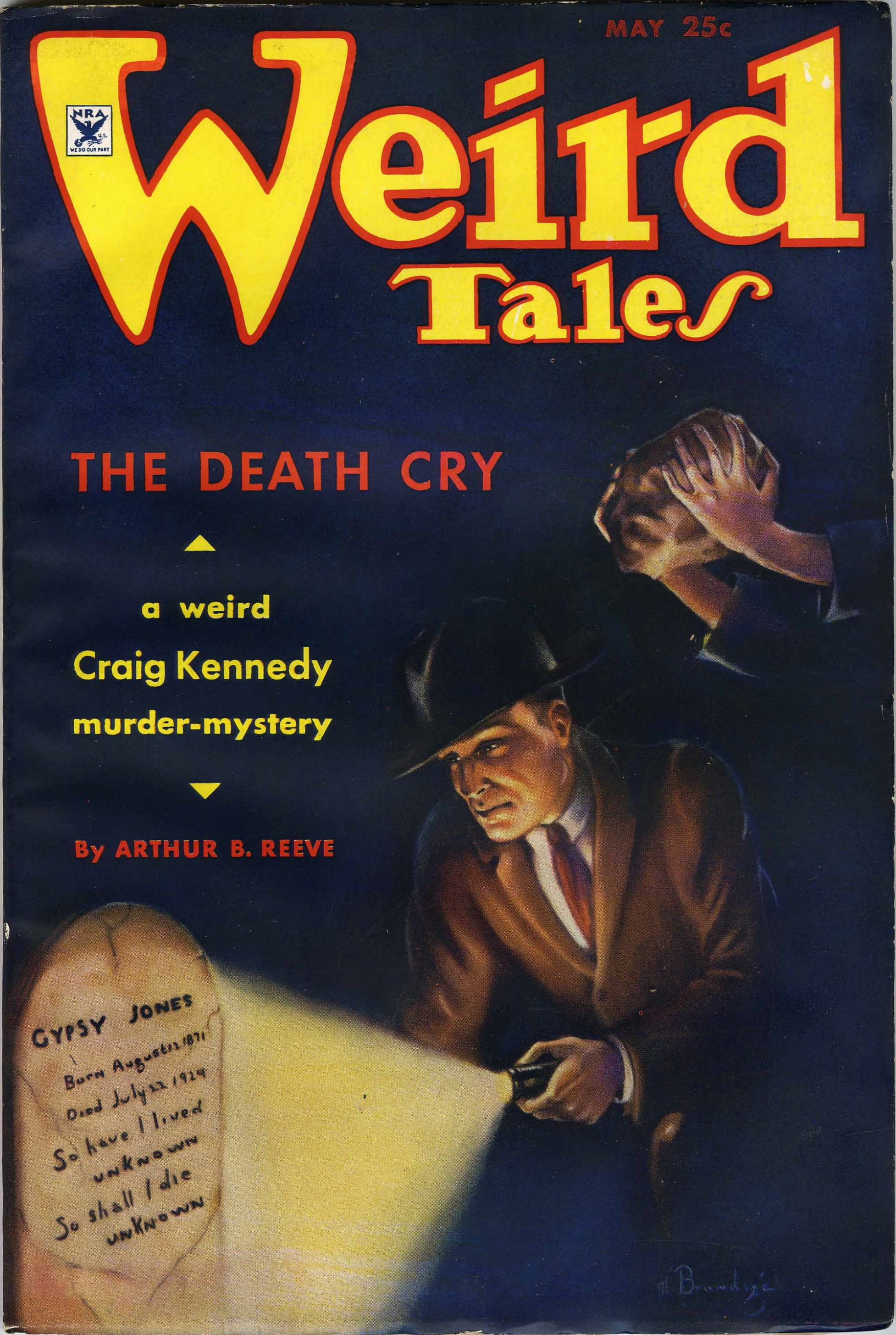
- Cover of Weird Tales, May 1935. Art by Margaret Brundage
- Country: United States
- Language: English
- Genre: Fantasy

Publication
- Published in: Weird Tales
- Publication type: Pulp magazine
- Publisher: Rural Publishing
- Publication date: May 1935

Chronology
- Series: Conan the Cimmerian
Jewels of Gwahlur	Shadows in Zamboula

"Beyond the Black River" is one of the original short stories about Conan the Cimmerian, written by American author Robert E. Howard and first published in Weird Tales magazine, v. 25, nos. 5-6, May–June 1935. The story was republished in the collections King Conan (Gnome Press, 1953) and Conan the Warrior (Lancer Books, 1967). It has more recently been published in the anthology The Mighty Swordsmen (Lancer Books, 1970), and the collections The Conan Chronicles Volume 2: The Hour of the Dragon (Gollancz, 2001) and Conan of Cimmeria: Volume Three (1935-1936) (Del Rey, 2005). It's set in the fictional Hyborian Age and concerns Conan's battle against a savage tribe of Picts in the unsettled lands beyond the infamous Black River.

== Plot overview ==
The story takes place in Conajohara, a newly established Aquilonian province recently annexed by King Numedides from the Picts. Balthus, a young settler on his way to Fort Tuscelan at the Black River, the province's border to the Pict Lands, encounters Conan in the forest slaying a Pict. Accompanying the young man back to the fort, Conan finds the corpse of a merchant left by a Pictish wizard named Zogar Sag and slain by a swamp demon. The fort's commander, Valannus, desperately asks Conan to slay Zogar Sag before he raises the Picts against the whole borderlands, especially since Tuscelan is vastly undermanned after Numedides foolishly decided to withdraw most of its garrison. Taking a hand-picked team of scouts and Balthus, Conan sets off stealthily in his canoe.

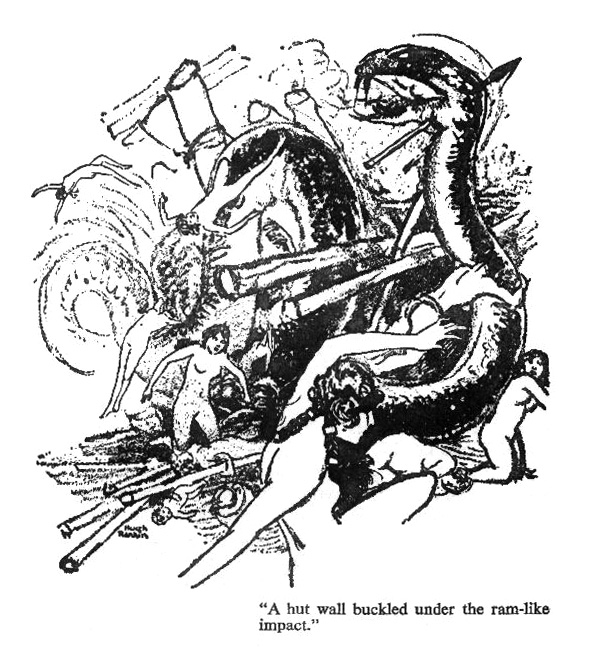
Illustration by Hugh Doak Rankin published in Weird Tales, 1935

Soon, Balthus is captured and most of Conan's men are slaughtered in an ambush. Balthus and one of the scouts are tied to stakes in a Pictish village, and soon the scout is sacrificed by Zogar Sag to one of his jungle creatures. Before Balthus can meet a similar fate, Conan shoots the creature, causing it to thrash around in the crowd, and the two flee into the forest. Conan tells Balthus information on the cult of Jhebbal Sag, now forgotten by most. Once all living creatures worshipped him when men and beasts spoke the same language. Over time, most men and beasts forgot his worship. Zogar Sag has not, however, and can control those few animals and creatures who also remember, sending them on Conan's trail.

Conan is able to fend off the pursuing beasts using a symbol he once noticed, and the pair return to the Fort to warn everyone of an impending Pictish assault, but they are too late. The Picts have already surrounded the fort, and a fierce battle is going on. The number of Picts ensures that eventually the fort will be overwhelmed and the defenders slaughtered. The only thing left to do is warn the settlers to flee while the Picts are busy with the fort - otherwise they will be slaughtered, too.

The two go to warn everyone that an army of Picts have crossed the river and are about to attack. They are joined by Slasher, a feral dog formerly owned by a settler who had been slain by the Picts. Balthus is sent on to warn the settlers of an incoming raid, and Conan parts from him to aid a group of fishermen who had gone to gather salt. Balthus warns the women and children to leave their huts and flee. When a band of Picts arrive, who move quicker and might overtake the women, Balthus stays behind to cover their escape. Accompanied by Slasher, he makes his last stand against the coming Pictish raiders, first shooting arrows from concealment and then in a furious face-to-face battle. Both Balthus and Slasher's sacrifice delays the Picts, giving the settlers time to reach safety. Conan manages to warn the salt-gathering party in time, but finds he has been marked for death by the gods of darkness for misusing the symbol of Jhebbal Sag, and is attacked by a demonic creature who tells him that it and Zogar Sag are of one blood. Conan triumphs against the creature, but the fort is lost, and so is the entire province.

The story ends in a tavern on the other side of Thunder River, the former boundary between the Pict Lands and Aquilonia. A sole survivor from Tuscelan tells Conan about the courageous act of Balthus and Slasher. He also relates that in the midst of his victory at Tuscelan, Zogar Sag was mysteriously struck dead, sporting the same kind of wounds Conan had inflicted on the swamp demon. Upon hearing of Balthus and Slasher's demise, Conan vows to take the heads of ten Picts to pay for Balthus, along with seven heads for the dog, who was "a better warrior than many a man".

As Conan turns back to his drink, the survivor mutters, "Barbarism is the natural state of mankind. Civilization is unnatural; it is a whim of circumstance... And barbarism must always ultimately triumph!"

== Analysis ==
In their book on Howard's work, Marc Cerasini and Charles E. Hoffman described "Beyond the Black River" as a "transplanted Western". They also noted that Howard had "used the setting of Robert W. Chambers's Indian novel The Little Red Foot as a model for his Pictish Wilderness". Howard scholar John Bullard argues the story is inspired by 19th century conflicts between settlers and natives in the Cross Timbers region of Texas; with the two rivers playing the role of the Trinity and Brazos rivers, and the attack on Tuscelan corresponding to the Fort Parker massacre in 1836. Another Howard scholar, Jeffrey Shanks, argues that "Beyond the Black River" is a critique of colonialism. Shanks notes that in the story, "Conan serves as an agent of the colonizing forces though not without disdain for their policies." He also argues that the failure of Aquilonia's expansion, and the story's closing lines, express Howard's "own cynical view of colonialism".

== Adaptation ==
- The story was adapted by Roy Thomas, John Buscema and Tony de Zuniga in Savage Sword of Conan #26 and #27.
- The story was also the basis for the GURPS: Conan adventure module "Beyond Thunder River".
- The Sword, on their album Gods of the Earth, based the song "The Black River" on this story.
- The story has also been adapted by publishing company Ablaze in their "Cimmerian" series of comics.

Preceded by "Jewels of Gwahlur"	Original Howard Canon (publication order)	Succeeded by "Shadows in Zamboula"
Preceded by "The Pool of the Black One"	Original Howard Canon (Dale Rippke chronology)	Succeeded by "The Black Stranger"
Preceded by Conan the Rogue	Complete Conan Saga (William Galen Gray chronology)	Succeeded by "Moon of Blood"
