= Heroes in the Wind =

2009 collection of short stories written by Robert E. Howard

- Cover of Heroes in the Wind
- Author: Robert E. Howard
- Language: English
- Series: Penguin Modern Classics
- Genre: Fantasy short stories
- Publisher: Penguin Books
- Publication date: 2009
- Publication place: United Kingdom
- Media type: Print (paperback)
- Pages: 562 pp.
- ISBN: 978-0-14-118943-7

Heroes in the Wind: From Kull to Conan; the Best of Robert E. Howard is a 2009 collection of dark fantasy and horror short stories written by Robert E. Howard, selected and with an introduction by John Clute. Most of the stories were originally published in various fantasy magazines and feature Howard's heroes Kull, Bran Mak Morn and Conan, among others. It was first published in paperback in September 2009 by Penguin Books in its Penguin Modern Classics series.

== Contents ==
- "Acknowledgements"
- "Introduction" (John Clute)
- Prelude
  - "Recompense"
- I Black Dawn
  - "The Shadow Kingdom"
  - "The Mirrors of Tuzun Thune"
  - "Kings of the Night"
  - "Worms of the Earth"
  - "The Dark Man"
- II Dark Interlude
  - "The Footfalls Within"
  - "Pigeons from Hell"
  - "Graveyard Rats"
  - "Vultures of Wahpeton"
- III High Noon
  - "The Tower of the Elephant"
  - "Queen of the Black Coast"
  - "A Witch Shall Be Born"
  - "Red Nails"
