= Valeria (Conan the Barbarian) =

Fictional character in the Conan series

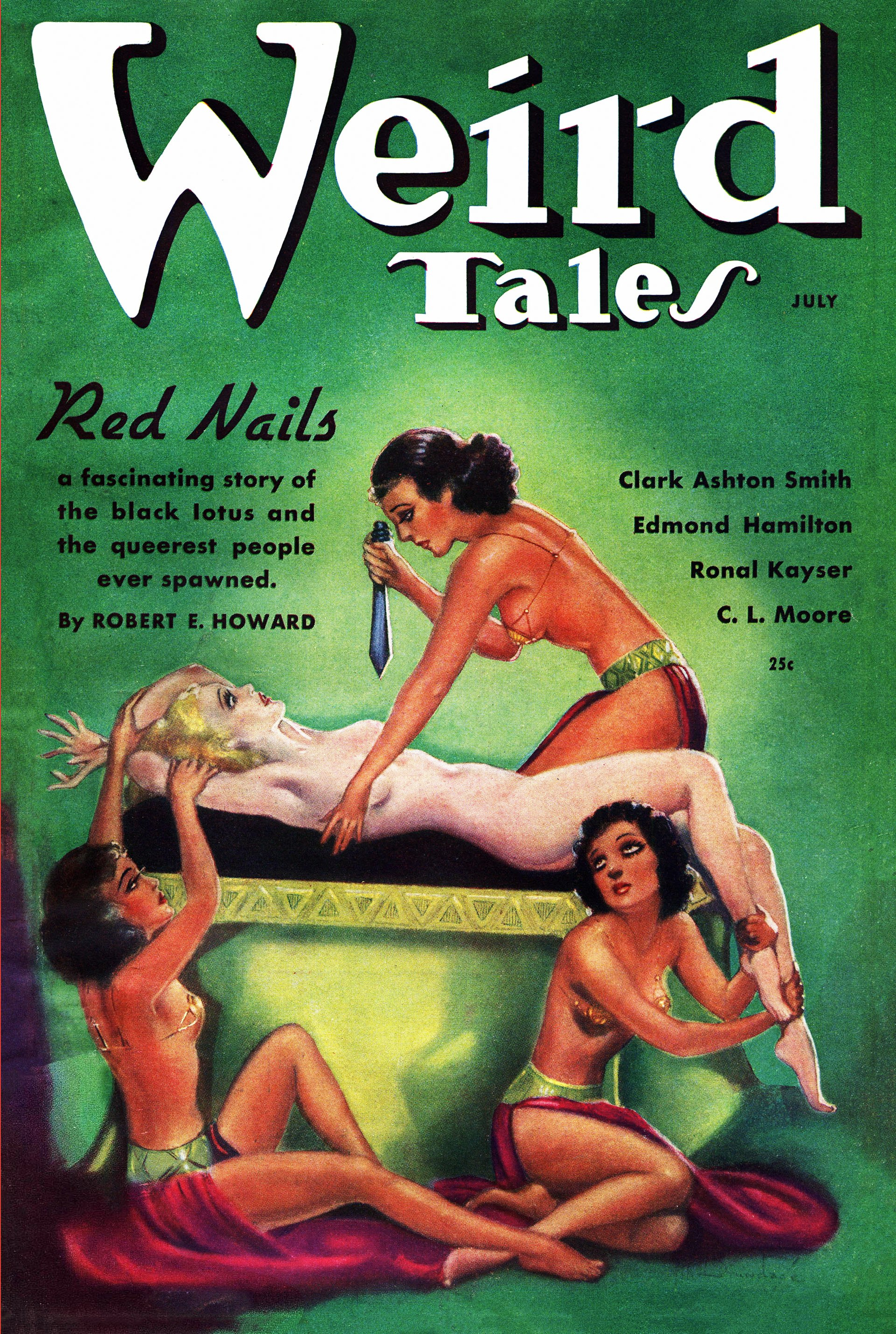
Cover of Weird Tales (July 1936) which featured the short story "Red Nails" by Robert E. Howard. It depicts Valeria about to be sacrificed by Tascela. Art by Margaret Brundage.

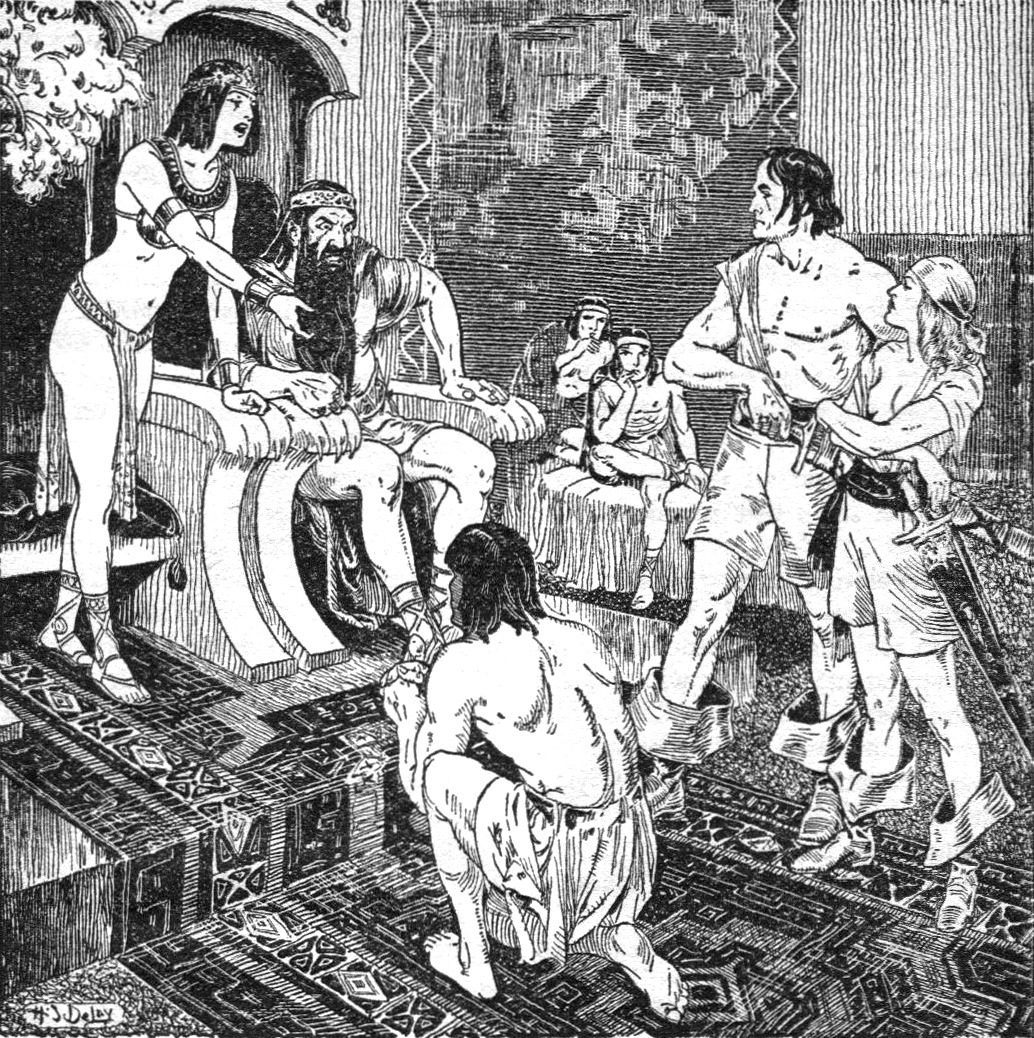
Interior illustration from Weird Tales (August–September 1936). It depicts Valeria standing on the far right, beside Conan. Art by Harold Saylor De Lay.

Valeria is a pirate and adventuress (a member of The Red Brotherhood of pirates) in the fictional universe of Robert E. Howard's Conan the Barbarian stories. She appears in Robert E. Howard's Conan novella "Red Nails", serialized in Weird Tales 28 1–3 (July, August/September & October 1936). This was the last Conan story written by Howard, and published posthumously. The name was also used for Conan's love interest in the 1982 film Conan the Barbarian.

== Description ==
Robert E. Howard described Valeria in "Red Nails" as follows:

She was tall, full-bosomed, and large-limbed, with compact shoulders. Her whole figure reflected an unusual strength, without detracting from the femininity of her appearance. She was all woman, in spite of her bearing and her garments. The latter were incongruous, in view of her present environs. Instead of a skirt she wore short, wide-legged silk breeches, which ceased a hand's breadth short of her knees, and were upheld by a wide silken sash worn as a girdle. Flaring-topped boots of soft leather came almost to her knees, and a low-necked, wide-collared, wide-sleeved silk shirt completed her costume. On one shapely hip she wore a straight double-edged sword, and on the other a long dirk. Her unruly golden hair, cut square at her shoulders, was confined by a band of crimson satin.

She is also described as a superior swordswoman, and is faster and more agile than Conan.

== Reception ==
The character is a powerful, active figure, but is also sometimes rendered helpless for the titillation of the reader. As Winter Elliott writes, Valeria "represents a mediation between the possibilities of female agency and her own gendered identity. As Conan points out, Valeria can't escape the simple fact of her femininity. As such, her identity is structured by her society. Like Conan, Valeria's pursuit of freedom against her society's wishes marginalizes her, making her other, but it also forces Howard to go to extravagant lengths to substantiate her femininity, which he does by including not one, but two female bondage scenes. If she can be subjected to such sexual humiliation, Howard implies, she must be female... What happens to Valeria is more about the needs of the reading/viewing audience than her own action or inaction. Valeria in those sexually debased moments isn't a character in and of herself, but rather a narrative tool designed to provoke a response from the readers."

== In other media ==
- Valeria had a major role in the 1982 film Conan the Barbarian, where she was played by Sandahl Bergman, although the character portrayed in the film differed from Howard's character, having a romantic relationship with Conan and borrowing characteristics from Bêlit, another character by Howard. Valeria is killed during the course of the film, but assists Conan in spirit form.
- Valeria appeared as an ally of the player in the 2008 MMO Age of Conan. She began to rule Tortage after the fall of the tyrant Strom.
