= The Scarlet Citadel =

1933 Conan novelette by Robert E. Howard

- Short story by Robert E. Howard

Text available at Wikisource
- Country: United States
- Language: English
- Genre: Fantasy

Publication
- Published in: Weird Tales
- Publication type: Pulp magazine
- Publisher: Rural Publishing Corp.
- Publication date: January 1933

Chronology
- Series: Conan the Cimmerian
The Phoenix on the Sword	The Tower of the Elephant

"The Scarlet Citadel" is one of the original short stories starring the fictional sword and sorcery hero Conan the Cimmerian, written by American author Robert E. Howard and first published in the January 1933 issue of Weird Tales magazine. In the fictional Hyborian Age, a middle-aged Conan battles rival kingdoms. The wizard Tsotha-lanti ensnares King Conan, who escapes a dungeon with unexpected aid.

The story was republished in the collections King Conan (Gnome Press, 1953) and Conan the Usurper (Lancer Books, 1967). It has more recently been published in the collections The Conan Chronicles Volume 2: The Hour of the Dragon (Gollancz, 2001) and Conan of Cimmeria: Volume One (1932–1933) (Del Rey, 2003).

== Plot summary ==
An older, wiser King Conan of Aquilonia receives a call for help from Amalrus, the ruler of neighbouring Ophir. Amalrus claims that Strabonus, the Emperor of Koth, is threatening his kingdom.

Conan marches into Ophir with an army of 5,000 Aquilonian knights. His planned campaign is a trap; the two monarchs are working together to destroy him with the help of a Kothian wizard named Tsotha-lanti. The Aquilonian knights are cut down by the Kothian cavalry, while Conan is imprisoned within a Korshemish dungeon. This dungeon is used by Tsotha-lanti for nefarious experiments, and Conan discovers many bizarre horrors during his escape.

Conan frees Pelias, a former rival wizard of Tsotha-lanti, who helps him escape the dungeon and regain his position as king of Aquilonia. The story climaxes with a gigantic battle, where Tsotha-lanti meets a grisly fate at the hands of Pelias.

== Reception ==
Robert Weinberg described "The Scarlet Citadel" as "Howard at his best"; he also praised the character of Pelias.

== Adaptation ==
The story was adapted by Roy Thomas and Frank Brunner in Savage Sword of Conan #30 in 1978, then by Tim Truman and Tomas Giorello in 2011 in King Conan: The Scarlet Citadel.

Preceded by "The Phoenix on the Sword"	Original Howard Canon (publication order)	Succeeded by "The Tower of the Elephant"
Preceded by "The Phoenix on the Sword"	Original Howard Canon (Dale Rippke chronology)	Succeeded by The Hour of the Dragon
Preceded by "The Phoenix on the Sword"	Complete Conan Saga (William Galen Gray chronology)	Succeeded by The Hour of the Dragon
