= Wolves Beyond the Border =

Unfinished Conan story fragment by Robert E. Howard

- Short story by Robert E. Howard
- Country: United States
- Language: English
- Genre: Fantasy

Publication
- Published in: Conan the Usurper
- Publication type: Anthology
- Publisher: Lancer Books
- Media type: Print (Paperback)
- Publication date: 1967
- Series: Conan the Barbarian

"Wolves Beyond the Border" is one of the original Conan stories by American writer Robert E. Howard, a fragment begun in the 1930s but not finished or published in Howard's lifetime. It is a peripheral story in the canon in that while it takes place in Conan's "Hyborian Age" and during Conan's lifetime, Conan does not actually appear, but is merely mentioned. The story was completed by L. Sprague de Camp and in this form first published in the collection Conan the Usurper (1967). It has since been published in its original form in the collection The Conan Chronicles Volume 2: The Hour of the Dragon (Gollancz, 2001) and The Conquering Sword of Conan (Del Rey, 2005).

== Plot summary ==
Set during the time of Conan's conquest of Aquilonia, the foreword and story refer to ongoing battles between the armies of Conan and King Numedides. The Picts see an opportunity, however. Narrated by a border ranger named Gault Hagar's son, he witnesses a secret Pictish ceremony conducted by Tenayoga, a shaman, and Lord Valerian, an Aquilonian nobleman. Gault travels to Fort Kwanyara, near the village of Schondara, where he delivers a secret message to Hakon [brother of the fort's commander], exchanges news on Conan's forces, and discovers Lord Valerian's treachery. Valerian is arrested and detained, but escapes his imprisonment and flees into the Pictish Wilderness.

Gault escapes his encounter with a giant ape and follows Valerian to a nearby cabin, where he spies on the nobleman's meeting with Tenayoga. The leaders of four Pictish tribes plan on joining forces and consult a wizard in their swamp. Gault, Hakon, and their rangers attack the cabin, setting it alight but Valerian escapes, along with Tenayoga and some henchmen. It is at this point that the original fragment ends.

The two rangers track those who escaped the carnage into a swamp and are soon captured. The tribes agree to raid Schondara first and quickly depart, leaving their captives bound at the stake. Gault escapes his bonds, slays the wizard, and the pair are just in time to sabotage the Pictish assault while being declared as heroes.

The atmosphere of the story is reminiscent of the American Frontier, with a plot that could have been easily transferred to that environment, with Aquilonian settlers as early Americans and Picts as Indians. Indeed, Howard did effect such a transformation with the preceding Conan story, "The Treasure of Tranicos", which is set in the same Pictish environment: failing to find a publisher, he transferred the story to a historical American background.

== Adaptation ==
The story was first adapted by Roy Thomas and Ernie Chan in Savage Sword of Conan #59 and then in 2005-2006 by Timothy Truman and Tomas Giorello for Dark Horse Comics.

| Preceded by "The Vale of Lost Women" | Original Howard Canon (publication order) | Succeeded by "The Hand of Nergal" |
| Preceded by "Jewels of Gwahlur" | Original Howard Canon (Dale Rippke chronology) | Succeeded by "The Phoenix on the Sword" |
| Preceded by "The Treasure of Tranicos" | Complete Conan Saga (William Galen Gray chronology) | Succeeded by Conan the Liberator |
