= The Conan Chronicles, 2 =

2001 collection of short stories written by Robert E. Howard

The Conan Chronicles: Volume 2: The Hour of the Dragon
- Cover of the first edition
- Author: Robert E. Howard
- Cover artist: John Howe
- Language: English
- Series: Gollancz Conan Chronicles
- Genre: Fantasy
- Publisher: Gollancz
- Publication date: 2000
- Publication place: United Kingdom
- Media type: Print (paperback)
- Pages: xii, 575 pp
- ISBN: 1-85798-747-0
- OCLC: 59534814
- Preceded by: The Conan Chronicles, Volume 1: The People of the Black Circle

The Conan Chronicles: Volume 2: The Hour of the Dragon is a collection of fantasy short stories written by Robert E. Howard featuring his sword and sorcery hero Conan the Barbarian. The book was published in 2001 by Gollancz as the sixteenth volume of their Fantasy Masterworks series. The book, edited by Stephen Jones, presents the stories in their internal chronological order. Most of the stories originally appeared in the magazines Weird Tales, Fantasy Magazine and The Howard Collector.

== Contents ==
- Map of the Hyborian Age, by Dave Senior
- Notes on Various Peoples of the Hyborian Age
- "Red Nails"
- "Jewels of Gwahlur"
- "Beyond the Black River"
- "The Black Stranger"
- "Wolves Beyond the Border" (Draft)
- "The Phoenix on the Sword"
- "The Scarlet Citadel"
- "The Hour of the Dragon" (poem)
- "The Hour of the Dragon"
- "Cimmeria"
- Afterword: Robert E. Howard and Conan: The Final Years, by Stephen Jones
