= The Conquering Sword of Conan =

Collection of stories by Robert E. Howard

- Cover of first edition (US)
- Author: Robert E. Howard
- Illustrator: Greg Manchess
- Cover artist: Greg Manchess
- Language: English
- Series: Conan the Barbarian
- Genre: Sword and sorcery
- Publisher: Del Rey Books
- Publication date: 2005
- Publication place: United States
- Pages: 384 p.
- Preceded by: The Bloody Crown of Conan

The Conquering Sword of Conan is the third of a three-volume set collecting the Conan the Barbarian stories by author Robert E. Howard. It was originally published in 2005, first in the United States by Ballantine/Del Rey under the present title and thereafter in 2009 by Wandering Star Books in the United Kingdom under the title Conan of Cimmeria: Volume Three (1935–1936).

The Science Fiction Book Club subsequently reprinted the complete set in hardcover. The set presents the original, unedited versions of Howard's Conan tales. This volume includes short stories as well as such miscellanea as drafts, notes, and maps, and is illustrated by Greg Manchess.

An audiobook narrated by Todd McLaren was released in 2005.

== Contents ==
=== Short stories ===
- "The Servants of Bit-Yakin" (also published as "Jewels of Gwahlur")
- "Beyond the Black River"
- "The Black Stranger"
- "Man-Eaters of Zamboula" (also published as "Shadows in Zamboula")
- "Red Nails"

=== Miscellaneous ===
- Untitled Notes
- "Wolves Beyond the Border", Draft A
- "Wolves Beyond the Border", Draft B
- "The Black Stranger", Synopsis A
- "The Black Stranger", Synopsis B
- "Man-Eaters of Zamboula", Synopsis
- "Red Nails" Draft

=== Ephemera ===
- Letter to P. Schuyler Miller
- Map of the Hyborian Age

=== Appendices ===
- Hyborian Genesis Part III (by Patrice Louinet)
- Notes on the Conan Typescripts and the Chronology (by Patrice Louinet)
- Notes on the Original Howard Texts (by Patrice Louinet)

== See also ==
- Conan the Barbarian
- Robert E. Howard
