= Conan the Warrior =

Book by Robert E. Howard

- Cover of first edition
- Author: Robert E. Howard
- Cover artist: Frank Frazetta
- Language: English
- Series: Conan the Barbarian
- Genre: Sword and sorcery
- Publisher: Lancer Books
- Publication date: 1967
- Publication place: United States
- Media type: Print (paperback)
- Pages: 222

Conan the Warrior is a 1967 collection of three fantasy short stories by American writer Robert E. Howard, featuring his sword and sorcery hero Conan the Barbarian. The collection is introduced and edited by L. Sprague de Camp. The stories originally appeared in the fantasy magazine Weird Tales in the 1930s. The book has been reprinted a number of times since by various publishers, and has also been translated into Japanese, German, French, Polish, Spanish, Swedish and Italian.

== Contents ==
- "Introduction" by L. Sprague de Camp
- "Red Nails"
- "Jewels of Gwahlur"
- "Beyond the Black River"

== Plot ==
In these stories from Conan's late thirties, the Cimmerian becomes involved in the civil wars of a lost city, a contest over treasure in the black kingdoms, and the border wars between the kingdom of Aquilonia and the savage Picts in the wilderness to the west.

Chronologically, the three short stories collected as Conan the Warrior fall between Conan the Buccaneer and Conan the Usurper.

== Sources ==
- Laughlin, Charlotte; Daniel J. H. Levack (1983). De Camp: An L. Sprague de Camp Bibliography. San Francisco: Underwood/Miller. p. 112.

Preceded by Conan the Buccaneer	Lancer/Ace Conan series (chronological order)	Succeeded by Conan the Usurper
