= The Sword of Conan =

Book by Robert E. Howard

- Cover of first edition
- Author: Robert E. Howard
- Language: English
- Series: Conan the Barbarian
- Genre: Sword and sorcery
- Publisher: Gnome Press
- Publication date: 1952
- Publication place: United States
- Media type: Print (hardback & paperback)

The Sword of Conan is a collection of four fantasy short stories by American writer Robert E. Howard featuring his sword and sorcery hero Conan the Barbarian, first published in hardcover by Gnome Press in 1952. The stories originally appeared in the 1930s in the fantasy magazine Weird Tales. The collection never saw publication in paperback; instead, its component stories were divided and distributed among other "Conan" collections.

Chronologically, the four short stories collected as The Sword of Conan are the third in Gnome's Conan series; the stories collected as King Conan follow.

== Contents ==
- "The People of the Black Circle"
- "The Slithering Shadow"
- "The Pool of the Black One"
- "Red Nails"

== Reception ==
Groff Conklin described the collection as "just another demijohn of corn ... full of blood, sex, sadism, violence ... all the garish trappings of escape into the Greater Past of the Natural Man". P. Schuyler Miller described the stories as "pure entertainment of the most outrageously blood-and-thunderish sort."

Preceded by Conan the Barbarian	Gnome Conan series (chronological order)	Succeeded by King Conan
