= Slim Brundage =

- Brundage hosting the Beat Convention at the College of Complexes in 1960
- Born: Myron Reed Brundage; November 29, 1903; Blackfoot, Idaho
- Died: October 18, 1990 (aged 86); El Cerrito, California
- Occupations: Anarchist, political activist
- Years active: 1920s-1960s
- Known for: College of Complexes

Myron Reed "Slim" Brundage (November 29, 1903 – October 18, 1990) was the "founder and janitor" of the College of Complexes, a radical social center in Chicago during the 1950s. It was known as Chicago's Number One "beatnik bistro".

== Biography ==
Slim Brundage was born at an insane asylum (a fact that he was proud of), where his mother worked, in Blackfoot, Idaho. His mother died when he was seven and his socialist journalist father placed him in an orphanage. His youth was troubled; he dropped out of grade school and ran away from home at age 14 to become a hobo. He changed his first name to Slim (given his body weight) and was educated at flophouses and boxcars across the country. Two years later, he became a member, and then organizer, of Industrial Workers of the World in Aberdeen, Washington. He thought the world would be better without bosses and politicians and was jailed for his protest activities.

In 1922, he settled in Chicago where he frequented forums on free speech; at the time, there were about 20 to 30 organizations. He worked as a bouncer and janitor of the Dil Pickle Club and later founded his own club, College of Complexes, in 1933 but closed after three months. Three years later, he became the director of the Hobo College. He reopened College of Complexes in 1951 with a $6,000 workman's pension. In the 1950s, author James T. Farrell was one of the speakers before moving to New York City. The organization moved locations through the 1950s into the 1960s and the Chicago Police Department's Red Squad unit visited them several times because of College of Complexes's anti-Cold War stance. In 1960, the shop hosted a Beat Convention to nominate a Beat Party candidate for President of the United States. Brundage ran for the nomination himself and, though he provided a place to sleep and free food for beatniks from out of town, he did not succeed. He shut down the organization in 1961, retired to Guadalajara in 1975, and later moved to Southern California in 1980s.

Brundage was also a writer and poet closely associated with the Beats. 'little theater' playwright/actor, president emeritus of the Hobo College in the 1930s, housepainter, humorist, and chief architect of the scandalous Beatnik Party during the 1960 elections. He called himself "The Janitor" because of his blue-collar background.

In 1997, Franklin Rosemont edited a collection entitled From Bughouse Square to the Beat Generation: Selected Ravings of Slim Brundage - Founder & Janitor of the College of Complexes, published by the Charles H. Kerr Publishing Company as part of its Bughouse Square Series.

He was married to artist Margaret Brundage (née Johnson) from 1927 to 1939, and Katarine C. Wood from 1940. At age 86, in 1990, he died from a brain hemorrhage in El Cerrito, California, while attending a senior citizens' bingo party. He was buried at German Waldheim Cemetery.
