= Conan the Barbarian (1955 collection) =

Conan story collection by Robert E. Howard

- Cover of first edition
- Author: Robert E. Howard
- Cover artist: Ed Emshwiller
- Language: English
- Genre: Sword and sorcery
- Publisher: Gnome Press
- Publication date: 1955
- Publication place: United States
- Media type: Print (hardback)

Conan the Barbarian is a collection of five fantasy short stories by American writer Robert E. Howard, featuring his sword and sorcery hero Conan the Barbarian, first published in hardcover by Gnome Press in 1955. The stories originally appeared in the 1930s in the fantasy magazine Weird Tales. This collection never saw publication in paperback; instead, its component stories were divided and distributed among other "Conan" collections. A later collection with the same title but different contents was issued in paperback by Del Rey/Ballantine Books in 2011.

Chronologically, the five short stories collected as Conan the Barbarian are the second in Gnome's Conan series; the stories collected as The Sword of Conan follow.

== Contents ==
- "Black Colossus" (1933)
- "Shadows in the Moonlight" (1934)
- "A Witch Shall be Born" (1934)
- "Shadows in Zamboula" (1935)
- "The Devil in Iron" (1934)

== Notes ==
Preceded by The Coming of Conan	Gnome Conan series (chronological order)	Succeeded by The Sword of Conan
