= Black Vulmea's Vengeance =

Book by Robert E. Howard

- Cover of the first edition
- Author: Robert E. Howard
- Illustrator: Robert James Pailthorpe
- Cover artist: Robert James Pailthorpe
- Language: English
- Genre: Adventure short stories
- Publisher: Donald M. Grant, Publisher, Inc.
- Publication date: 1976
- Publication place: United States
- Media type: Print (hardback)
- Pages: 223 pp
- OCLC: 2796604

Black Vulmea's vengeance & Other Tales of Pirates is a collection of adventure short stories about pirates by Robert E. Howard. It was first published in 1976 by Donald M. Grant, Publisher, Inc. in an edition of 2,750 copies. The title story first appeared in the magazine Golden Fleece in 1938.

"Swords of the Red Brotherhood", set in a historical framework, is a recognizable variant of "The Black Stranger", taking place in fictional fantasy world of Conan The Barbarian.

The title story features Terence Vulmea, aka Black Vulmea, who was born a 17th-century Irish peasant, and carried his vendetta with the English oppressors of his country to the waters of the Caribbean. He is one of Robert E. Howard's lesser known characters; more of his exploits were later added by David C. Smith.

== Contents ==
- "Swords of the Red Brotherhood"
- "Black Vulmea's Vengeance"
- "The Isle of Pirates' Doom"
