= The Bloody Crown of Conan =

Collection of stories by Robert E. Howard

- Cover of first edition (UK)
- Author: Robert E. Howard
- Illustrator: Gary Gianni
- Cover artist: Gary Gianni
- Language: English
- Series: Conan the Barbarian
- Genre: Sword and sorcery
- Publisher: Wandering Star Books (UK); Del Rey Books (US)
- Publication date: 2004 (UK), 2005 (US)
- Publication place: United States
- Pages: 384 p.
- Preceded by: The Coming of Conan the Cimmerian
- Followed by: The Conquering Sword of Conan

The Bloody Crown of Conan is the second of a three-volume set collecting the Conan stories by author Robert E. Howard. It was originally published in 2004, first in the United Kingdom by Wandering Star Books, under the title Conan of Cimmeria: Volume Two (1934), and then in the United States by Ballantine/Del Rey under the present title in 2005. The Science Fiction Book Club subsequently reprinted the complete set in hardcover. The set is noted for presenting the original, unedited versions of Howard's Conan tales. This volume includes three short novels (two of which had never before been released in their original form) as well as miscellanea for Howard fans and enthusiasts (e.g., drafts, notes, maps, etc.), and is illustrated by artist Gary Gianni.

== Content ==
The book contains three novellas:

- "The People of the Black Circle"
- The Hour of the Dragon
- "A Witch Shall Be Born"

=== Miscellanea ===
- Untitled Synopsis ("The People of the Black Circle")
- "The Story Thus Far"
- Untitled Synopsis (Drums of Tombalku)
- Untitled draft (Drums of Tombalku)
- Untitled synopsis ("The Hour of the Dragon")
- Notes on The Hour of the Dragon
- Untitled Synopsis ("A Witch Shall Be Born")

=== Appendices ===
- Hyborian Genesis Part II (by Patrice Louinet)
- Notes on the Conan Typescripts and the Chronology (by Patrice Louinet)
- Notes on the Original Howard Texts (by Patrice Louinet)

== See also ==
- Conan the Barbarian
- Robert E. Howard
