= Golden Fleece Historical Adventure =

American adventure pulp magazine

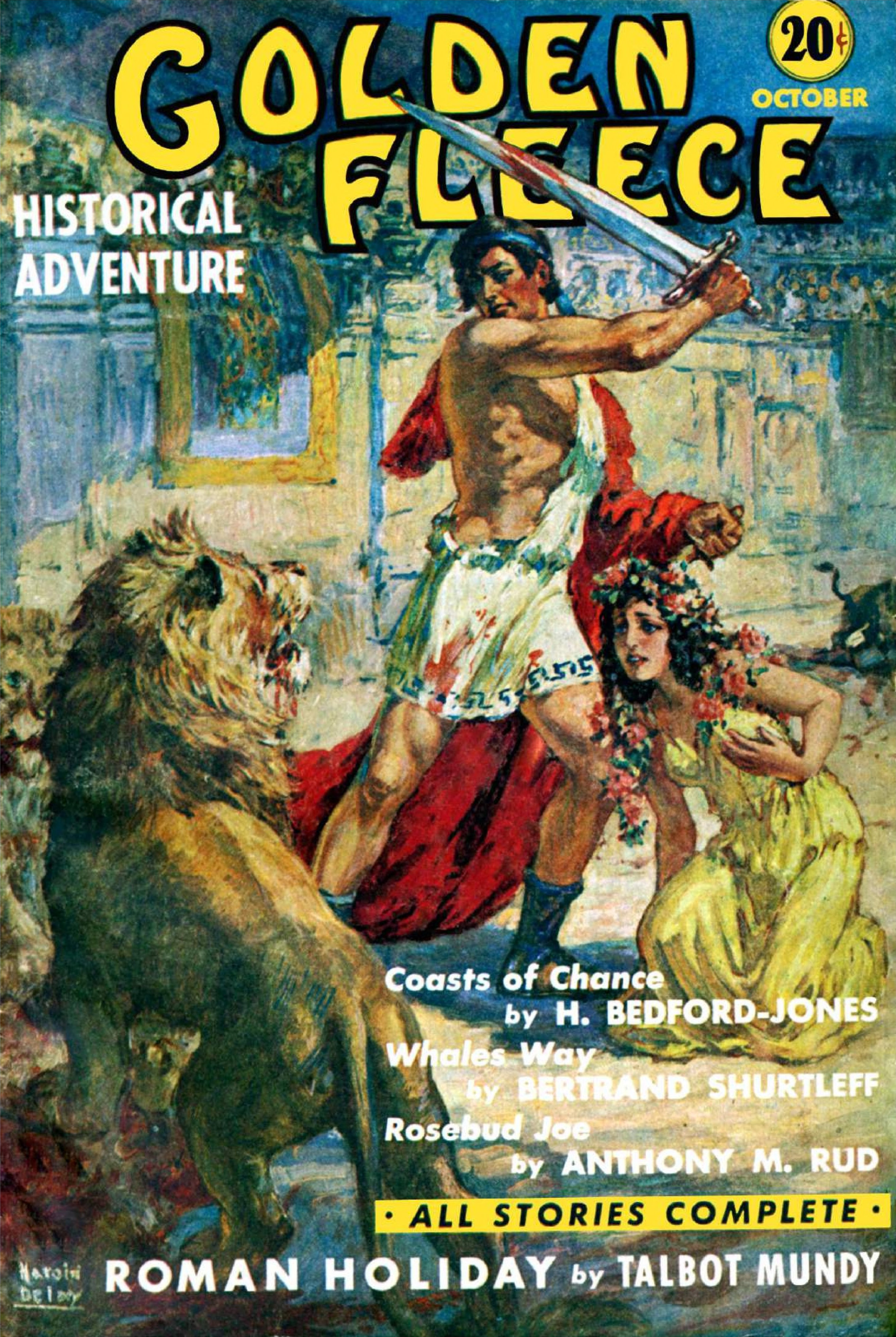
- Cover of first issue
- First issue: October 1938
- Final issue: June 1939
- Company: Sun Publications
- Country: USA

Golden Fleece Historical Adventure was an American adventure pulp magazine which published nine issues between 1938 and 1939. Golden Fleece specialised in publishing historical fiction - one of the few pulp magazines to do so. It published two stories by Robert E. Howard, the creator of Conan the Barbarian: "Black Vulmea's Vengeance" and "Gates of Empire". Other writers included Talbot Mundy, H. Bedford-Jones, Ralph Milne Farley, Anthony M. Rud and Murray Leinster. Contributing artists included Jay Jackson, Harold Delay, Harold McCauley, and Margaret Brundage, who painted two covers for Golden Fleece.

Science fiction historian Mike Ashley describes it as a "rousing and unpretentious" magazine, and suggests that it may have failed because of distribution problems; the publisher, Sun Publications, was a small Chicago-based firm. Ashley also suggests that it would have been difficult for the magazine to compete with Adventure, one of the leading pulp magazines of its day.

== Bibliographic details ==
The publisher was Sun Publications of Chicago; the editors were A. J. Gontier, Jr., and C.G. Williams. There were nine monthly issues, from October 1938 to June 1939. There was one volume of three issues, and a second volume of six issues. Each magazine was in pulp format, with 128 pages, priced at 20 cents.

There was one anthology published that collected fiction from Golden Fleece Historical Adventure:

- Desmond, William (1975). Golden Fleece Historical Adventure. Melrose Highlands, Massachusetts: Odyssey Publications. OCLC 317511542.

== Sources ==
- Ashley, Mike (1985). "Golden Fleece Historical Adventure". In Tymn, Marshall B.; Ashley, Mike (eds.). Science Fiction, Fantasy and Weird Fiction Magazines. Westport, Connecticut: Greenwood Press. pp. 319–320. ISBN 0-3132-1221-X.
- Agnew, Jeremy (2018). The Age of Dimes and Pulps: A History of Sensationalist Literature, 1830-1960. Jefferson, North Carolina: McFarland. p. 174. ISBN 978-1-4766-6948-9.
- Ashley, Mike (1995). Contento, William; Ashley, Mike (eds.). The Supernatural Index: A Listing of Fantasy, Supernatural, Occult, Weird, and Horror Anthologies. Westport, Connecticut: Greenwood Press. p. 14. ISBN 0-3132-4030-2.
- Ellis, Douglas (2017). Ellis, Douglas; Hulse, Ed; Robert, Weinberg (eds.). The Art of the Pulps : An Illustrated History. Westport, Connecticut: IDW Publishing. pp. 17, 30. ISBN 978-1-68405-091-8.
