= Conan the Usurper =

Book by Robert E. Howard

- Cover of first edition
- Author: Robert E. Howard and L. Sprague de Camp
- Cover artist: Frank Frazetta
- Language: English
- Series: Conan the Barbarian
- Genre: Sword and sorcery
- Publisher: Lancer Books
- Publication date: 1967
- Publication place: United States
- Media type: Print (paperback)
- Pages: 256 pp

Conan the Usurper is a 1967 collection of four fantasy short stories by American writers Robert E. Howard and L. Sprague de Camp, featuring Howard's sword and sorcery hero Conan the Barbarian. Most of the stories originally appeared in the fantasy magazine Weird Tales in the 1930s. The book has been reprinted a number of times since by various publishers, and has also been translated into German, Spanish, Italian, Swedish and Dutch.

== Contents ==
- "Introduction" (L. Sprague de Camp)
- "The Treasure of Tranicos" (Robert E. Howard and L. Sprague de Camp)
- "Wolves Beyond the Border" (Robert E. Howard and L. Sprague de Camp)
- "The Phoenix on the Sword" (Robert E. Howard)
- "The Scarlet Citadel" (Robert E. Howard)

== Plot summary ==
Conan, about forty in these stories, embarks on the most desperate gamble of his life — leading a revolution against King Numedides of Aquilonia, with the goal of making himself king in his place. From his low point as a treasure-seeking fugitive in the Pictish Wilderness, he is retrieved by allies from his days in the Aquilonian army to lead the revolt. The borderlands suffer grievously during the war, but in the end Conan takes the throne, only to suffer the customary uneasiness of the head that wears the crown, from an attempted assassination involving Stygian sorcerer Thoth-Amon to magical treachery on the battlefield as he strives to defend his hard-won kingship against predatory foreign powers.

The Aquilonian civil war between Conan and Numedides is not actually depicted, but occurs offstage as background to the action of "Wolves Beyond the Border", Howard's only non-Conan tale set in the Hyborian Age. De Camp later made the war itself the subject of his novel Conan the Liberator, co-written with Lin Carter.

"The Phoenix on the Sword", which Howard rewrote from an earlier Kull story, marks his only use of Thoth-Amon as an antagonist, in a somewhat peripheral role — he and Conan never even meet! In later stories, De Camp and Carter would later elevate the Stygian sorcerer into one of Conan's principal enemies.

Howard later reused the plot of "The Scarlet Citadel" as the basis of his only Conan novel, The Hour of the Dragon (afterwards retitled Conan the Conqueror).

Chronologically, the four short stories collected as Conan the Usurper fall between Conan the Warrior and Conan the Conqueror.

== Sources ==
- Laughlin, Charlotte; Daniel J. H. Levack (1983). De Camp: An L. Sprague de Camp Bibliography. San Francisco: Underwood/Miller. pp. 42–43.

Preceded by Conan the Warrior	Lancer/Ace Conan series (chronological order)	Succeeded by Conan the Conqueror
