= Anthony M. Rud =

American novelist

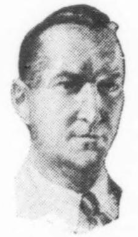
- Born: January 11, 1893; Chicago, Illinois
- Died: November 30, 1942 (aged 49); New York City
- Writing career
- Pen name: Ray McGillivary, Anson Piper, R. Anthony
- Years active: 1918–1942
- Genres: science fiction, horror, detective
- Notable works: "Ooze" (1923), The Stuffed Men (1934)

Anthony Melville Rud (11 January 1893 – 30 November 1942) was an American writer and pulp magazine editor. Some of his works were published under the pen names R. Anthony, Ray McGillivary, and Anson Piper.

== Biography ==
Anthony Melville Rud was born in Chicago, Illinois, to Dr. Anthony Rud (1867–1928), an immigrant from Kongsberg, Norway, and Dr. Alice Florence (Piper) Rud (1871–1941). Rud attended St. John's Military School in Delafield, Wisconsin, and graduated from Dartmouth College in 1914. He also studied at Rush Medical College in Chicago.

As an author, he worked in several genres, including science fiction, horror and detective. His notable works include science fiction/horror/detective story "Ooze" (1923), which appeared in the first issue of Weird Tales and also featured in the book collection The Moon Terror published by Weird Tales (anonymously edited by Farnsworth Wright). Rud authored a science fiction/detective novel named The Stuffed Men (1934) as part of his "Jiggers Masters" series of stories. Rud contributed stories to Weird Tales, Argosy, Thrilling Wonder Stories, Golden Fleece Historical Adventure and other magazines.

He was the fourth editor of Adventure magazine from 15 October 1927 to 15 February 1930.

Rud also edited Detective Story Magazine in 1938 for Street and Smith.

He died in New York City at age 49.

=== Selected short stories ===
- A Square of Canvas (1923)
- The Forty Jars (1923)
- The Parasitic Hand (1926)
- The Endocrine Monster (1927)
- The Witch-Baiter (1927)
- The Spectral Lover (1928)
- The Place of Hairy Death (1934)
- Bellowing Bamboo (1934)

=== Novellettes ===
- Ooze (1923)

=== Novellas ===
- The Devil's Heirloom (1922)

=== Novels ===
- The Last Grubstake (1922)
- The Second Generation (1923)
- The Sentence of the Six-Gun (1926)
- The Rose Bath Riddle (1934)
- House of the Damned (1934)
- The Stuffed Men (1934)
- Black Creek Buckaroo (1941)

=== Collections ===
- The Place of Hairy Death and Other Stories (2015)
- The Vengeance of the Wah Fu Tong (The Complete Cases of Jigger Masters, Volume 1) (2018)
