= College of Complexes =

American free speech organization

The College of Complexes is an American loose organization committed to free speech, those interested in continuing adult education, and focusing on social issues and current events. The name is derived from "a psychiatric term for repressed ideas that compel expression." The underlying purpose is to solve all the world's problems.

== History ==
This organization was founded in Chicago on January 6, 1951, by Myron Reed "Slim" Brundage, at 1651 North Wells St in Old Town. The organization changed locations on several occasions. Through the 1950s and into the 1960s, the Chicago Police Department's Red Squad unit visited them several times because of College of Complexes's anti-Cold War stance.

The College of Complexes describes itself as a "Playground for People Who Think." The primary function of this group is to organize weekly free speech forums where speakers, representing diverse points of view, will make a presentation. Following the speech, audience members are invited to make "remarks and/or rebuttals," and each is allowed a maximum of 5 minutes to respond. Order is maintained at meetings by adherence to the college's only, and long-standing rule, of listening to "One Fool at a Time."

The diverse topics covered in this forum have included: "Frederic Bastiat and 'The Law'", "Universal Law and the Code of Humanity", "Why I Refuse to Confirm or Deny Anything", and "A Revolutionary Party for a Reactionary Period"

Over 150+ programs have been videotaped, and an archive termed a "Lecture Library" is maintained at the website.

The college has issued a "Statement of Free Speech" which maintains that: "Our constitution and laws encourage the freest possible exchange of opinions, ideas, and information. In part, that recognizes our worth and dignity as human beings. To forbid us to speak our minds demeans us and makes us more like slaves or robots than citizens of a free country. But as important as freedom of expression is for us as individuals, it is perhaps more important to society at large."
