= The Hour of the Dragon =

1950 fantasy novel by Robert E. Howard

- Cover of first edition
- Author: Robert E. Howard
- Cover artist: John Forte
- Language: English
- Series: Conan the Barbarian
- Genre: Sword & Sorcery
- Publisher: Gnome Press
- Publication date: 1950
- Publication place: United States
- Media type: Print (Hardback)
- Pages: 255

The Hour of the Dragon, also known as Conan the Conqueror, is a fantasy novel by American writer Robert E. Howard featuring his sword and sorcery hero Conan the Cimmerian. It was one of the last Conan stories published before Howard's suicide, although not the last to be written. The novel was first published in serial form in the December 1935 through April 1936 issues of the pulp magazine Weird Tales. The first book edition was published by Gnome Press in hardcover in 1950. The Gnome Press edition retitled the story Conan the Conqueror, a title retained by all subsequent editions until 1977, when the original title was restored in an edition published by Berkley/Putnam. The Berkley edition also reverted the text to that of its original Weird Tales publication, discarding later edits. Later editions have generally followed Berkley and published under the original title.

== Plot overview ==
The plot is loosely based on a melange of motifs from previous Conan short stories, most notably "The Scarlet Citadel", with which its early chapters share an almost identical storyline: Conan, captured and placed in a monster-infested dungeon, finds an unexpected ally and escapes. Meanwhile, the population of the Aquilonian capital, believing him dead, riots and is ready to accept an alternative King. From here the two diverge: The Scarlet Citadel, a short story, ends with Conan coming back when the rioting has just started and making short work of his foes; in the book-length Hour of the Dragon Aquilonia has to live under a long and harrowing foreign occupation while Conan goes through a long hazardous quest, before he could finally come back and dispose of his foes.

The book begins when Conan is about forty-two, during his reign as the King of Aquilonia, and deals with a plot by a group of conspirators to depose him in favor of Valerius, heir to Conan's predecessor Numedides, whom he had slain to gain the throne. To accomplish this they resort to necromancy, resurrecting Xaltotun, an ancient sorcerer from the almost forgotten evil empire of Acheron. With his aid, the Aquilonian army is defeated by the rival kingdom of Nemedia and occupied. Conan, captured, is slated for execution until a sympathetic slave girl, Zenobia, risks her life to free him.

Conan's quest to retrieve the Heart of Ahriman in order to defeat the wizard and regain his throne takes him through all the kingdoms of the Hyborian Age.

After his eventual triumph, he vows to make Zenobia his queen.

== Publication history ==
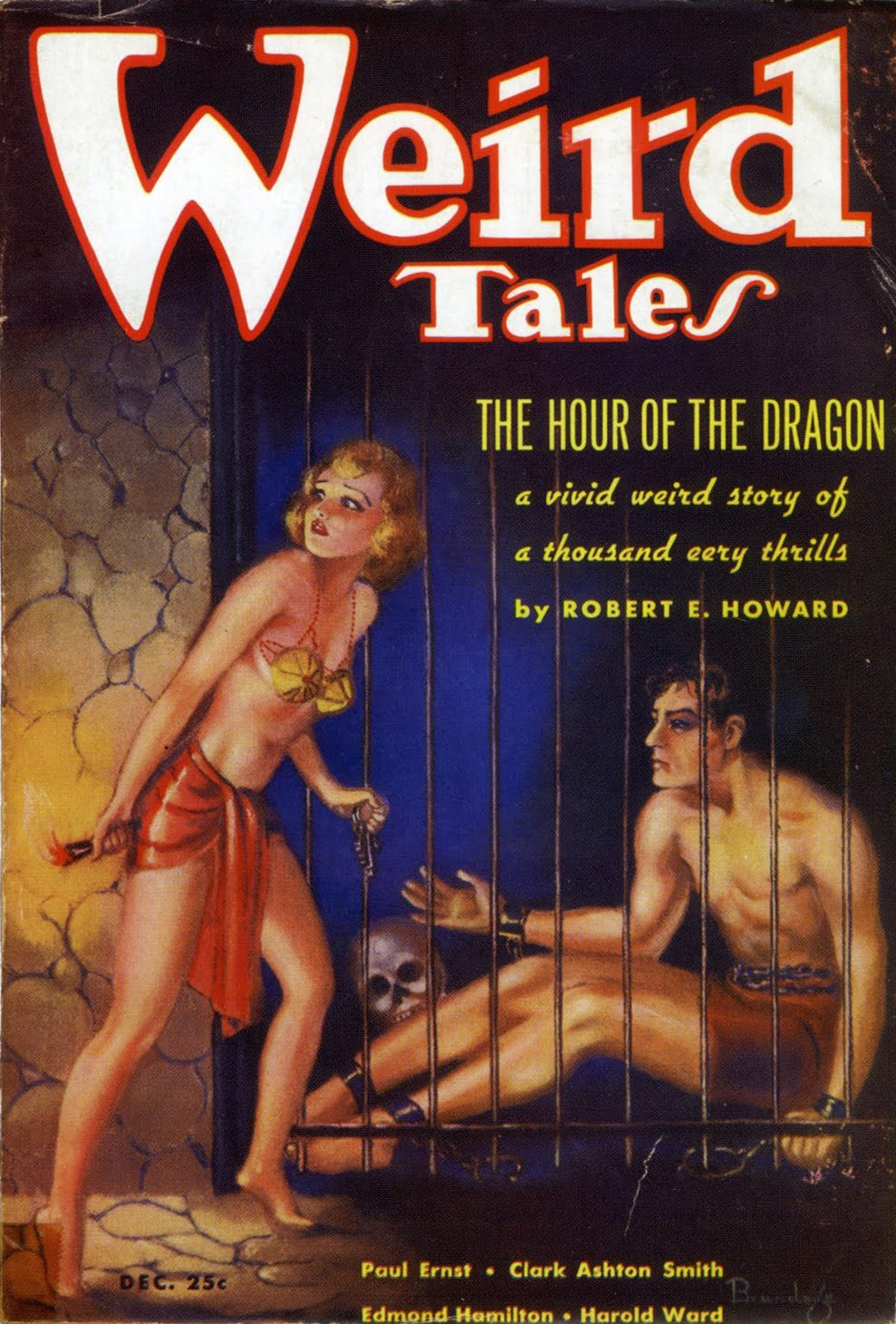
Cover of Weird Tales (December 1935) in which The Hour of the Dragon was first serialized

It was Howard's only full-length novel about Conan, and is considered by many to be one of his best works. It was originally written for British publisher Dennis Archer and was submitted to them in May 1934. Archer had turned down a collection of works in 1933 but made the suggestion of a novel. However, the publisher went bankrupt before the novel could be printed and it was held by the Official Receiver.

The story was first published as a five-part serial in Weird Tales between the months of December 1935 to April 1936 (with chapter 20 being misprinted as chapter 21):

- Robert E. Howard, "The Hour of the Dragon", Weird Tales, 26.6 (December 1935), pp. 658–84
- Robert E. Howard, "The Hour of the Dragon", Weird Tales, 27.1 (January 1936), pp. 72–104
- Robert E. Howard, "The Hour of the Dragon", Weird Tales, 27.2 (February 1936), pp. 188–210
- Robert E. Howard, "The Hour of the Dragon", Weird Tales, 27.3 (March 1936), pp. 323–44
- Robert E. Howard, "The Hour of the Dragon", Weird Tales, 27.4 (April 1936), pp. 450–71

It was first published in book form in hardcover by Gnome Press in 1950 under the title Conan the Conqueror, a title retained by all later editions until 1977. The first paperback edition was published by Ace Books D-36 in 1953 in a tête-bêche double with The Sword of Rhiannon and cover art by Norman Saunders.

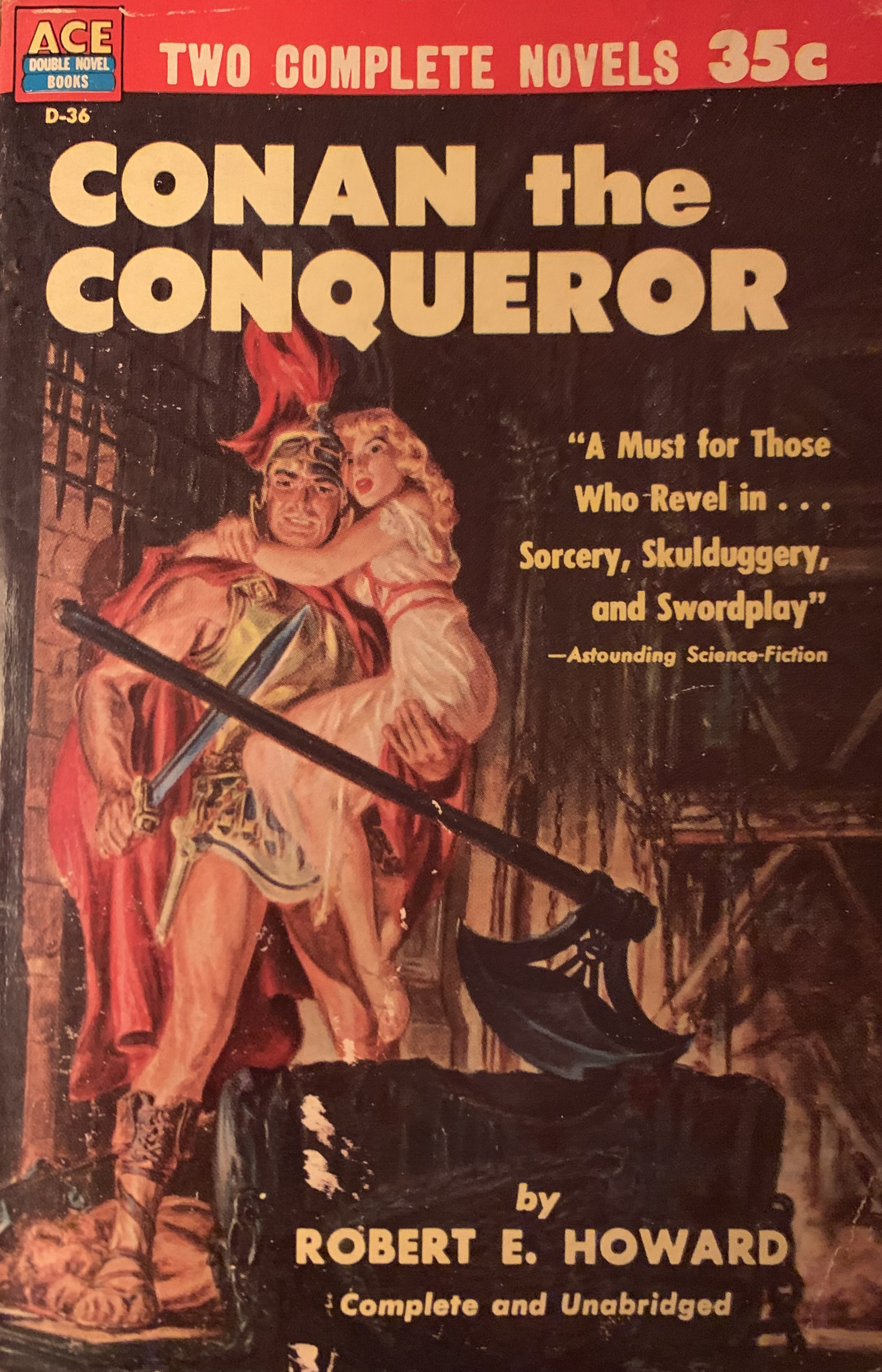
One side cover of Ace Double D36 (1953) for CONAN the CONQUEROR, the first paperback edition of the book

The novel has been reissued a number of times since by various publishers, notably Lancer Books in 1967 and Berkley/Putnam in 1977; the latter, reedited by Karl Edward Wagner, was the first edition to restore the original magazine text and title, under which most subsequent editions have been issued. Donald M. Grant, Publisher, Inc. published an edition in 1989, with illustrations by Ezra Tucker, as volume XI of their deluxe Conan set. More recently the novel appeared in the collections The Essential Conan (1998), Conan Chronicles Volume 2: The Hour of the Dragon (2001) and Conan of Cimmeria: Volume Two (1934) (Del Rey, 2005). It has also been translated into Japanese, Italian, Finnish, French, German, Swedish, Czech, Russian, Sinhalese, Spanish, and Polish.

== Position in the Conan series ==
In the hardcover Gnome Press edition of the Conan stories, Conan the Conqueror follows the short stories collected as King Conan; in the paperback Lancer/Ace edition, it follows the short stories collected as Conan the Usurper. In both editions it precedes the Björn Nyberg/L. Sprague de Camp novel The Return of Conan (also known as Conan the Avenger).

== Reception ==
Reviewing the Gnome Press edition, Groff Conklin found the novel to have "real merit" considered as an imaginative work, but characterized Howard's writing as "only average [and] laden with bombast". He recommended the book to "those who like to lean back and read with their minds closed". L. Sprague de Camp, acknowledging that Howard was "an almost-very-good writer ... with limiting quirks," praised the novel as "a sanguinary combination of sorcery, skulduggery, and swordplay." This review is referenced on the front cover of The Ace D36 publication (1953), but concentrating on the words "A Must for Those Who Revel in ... Sorcery, Skulduggery, and Swordplay."

Karl Edward Wagner writes in the afterword to the 1977 edition, "As such, the novel ranks as one of Howard's best pieces of writing -- and as one of the best novels ever written in the epic fantasy genre." ... "Howard is mature as a prose stylist -- varying his delivery from headlong fast-paced action, to passages of atmospheric prose-poetry."

== Adaptations ==
In 1974, the story was adapted by Roy Thomas, Gil Kane, and John Buscema in Marvel Comic's Giant-Size Conan #1-4 and Savage Sword of Conan #8, #10. The lead story in Giant-Size Conan #1 was a 25-page chapter from The Hour of the Dragon. The plan was to adapt the novel over the first six issues, but Giant-Size Conan #4 was the last full color chapter. The story was concluded in the black & white magazine Savage Sword of Conan #8 and #10.

A number of amateur audiobook editions exist, including one narrated by Morgan Saletta (2009–2010) released as part of SF Audio's Second Book Challenge; and one narrated by Mark Nelson for LibriVox (2013). There is an eight and half hour professional commercial reading available under the title of The Bloody Crown of Conan (originally Trantor, 2009, now available through Audible).

The 1997 film Kull the Conqueror is loosely based on The Hour of the Dragon, replacing Conan with Kull but otherwise keeping the same basic plot of a barbarian king being removed from his throne by the machinations of an undead sorcerer.

In 2012, Dark Horse began a new comic series called Conan the Conqueror. The first stories are an adaptation of The Hour of the Dragon.

The story has also been adapted by publishing company Ablaze in their Cimmerian series of comics.

== Sources ==
- Chalker, Jack L.; Mark Owings (1998). The Science-Fantasy Publishers: A Bibliographic History, 1923–1998. Westminster, MD and Baltimore: Mirage Press, Ltd. p. 299.
- Laughlin, Charlotte; Daniel J. H. Levack (1983). De Camp: An L. Sprague de Camp Bibliography. San Francisco: Underwood/Miller. pp. 110–111.

| Preceded by King Conan | Gnome series (chronological order) | Succeeded by The Return of Conan |
| Preceded by Conan the Usurper | Lancer/Ace Conan series (chronological order) | Succeeded by Conan the Avenger |
| Preceded by The Pool of the Black One | Grant Conan series (publication order) | Succeeded by none |
| Preceded by none | Berkley Conan series (publication order) | Succeeded by The People of the Black Circle |
| Preceded by "Shadows in Zamboula" | Original Howard Canon (publication order) | Succeeded by "Red Nails" |
| Preceded by "The Scarlet Citadel" | Original Howard Canon (Dale Rippke chronology) | Succeeded by none |
| Preceded by "The Scarlet Citadel" | Complete Conan Saga (William Galen Gray chronology) | Succeeded by The Return of Conan |
