= Red Nails =

Conan novella by Robert E. Howard

- Short story by Robert E. Howard
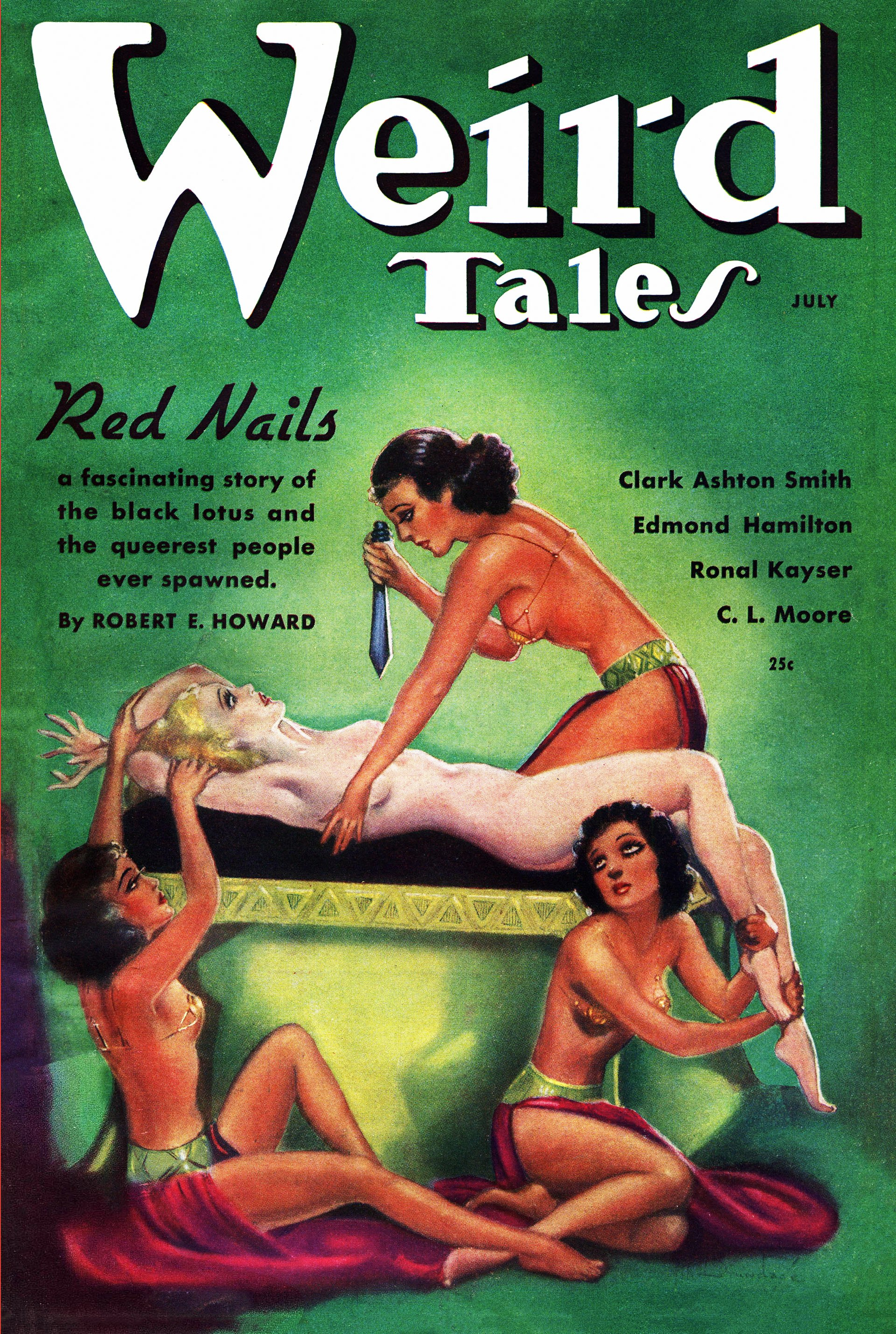
- Cover by Margaret Brundage of Weird Tales issue July 1936 featuring Valeria and Tascela
- Country: USA
- Language: English
- Genre: sword and sorcery

Publication
- Published in: Weird Tales
- Publication type: Pulp magazine
- Publication date: 1936
- Series: Conan the Cimmerian

"Red Nails" is the last of the stories featuring Conan the Cimmerian written by American author Robert E. Howard. A novella, it was originally serialized in Weird Tales magazine from July to October 1936, the months after Howard's suicide. It is set in the fictional Hyborian Age and concerns Conan entering a lost city whose degenerate inhabitants are entangled in a murderous blood feud. Due to its dark themes of decay and death, the story is considered a classic of Conan lore while also cited by Howard scholars as one of his best tales.

== Plot summary ==
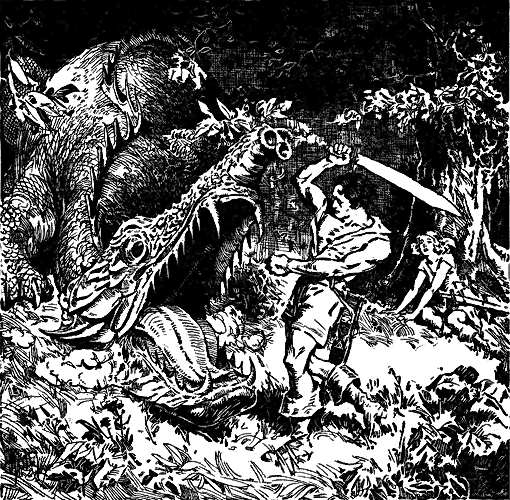
Harold S. Delay illustration of the story's "dragon"

In the jungles far to the south of any known civilized or barbarian kingdoms, Valeria of the Red Brotherhood flees persecution after murdering a would-be rapist. She is followed into the wilderness by Conan, a fellow adventurer who wishes for an alliance with Valeria as her lover. Conan's stand-off with Valeria is interrupted by a dragon (actually a dinosaur, described with the characteristics of a Stegosaurus and Allosaurus) which mauls their horses. Conan and Valeria escape the dragon by climbing onto a rocky outcropping. Though they are trapped there without food or water, Conan recognizes some poisonous fruit growing nearby. Acting quickly, he coats the tip of a spear in poison and pierces the dragon's lower jaw with a well-aimed throw. Although blinded, the enraged beast pursues the two fugitives by their scent, but dies from the poison seconds before devouring Conan.

The couple emerge from their shelter and journey towards a mysterious walled city, which Conan sighted from the hill. Without grazing livestock or cultivated fields, the city appears deserted. Conan pries open a gate, long since rusted shut, and they enter a bizarre twilight world. The city, which is known as Xuchotl, is a massive structure completely enclosed by an emerald dome. A single great hallway runs across the entire city, without other streets or open courtyards. The structure consists entirely of four levels of rooms, chambers, and passageways. Xuchotl itself is carved from jade and other exotic materials.

The two separate and search the city's empty corridors. Valeria encounters a man named Techotl, who she joins in his feud between the two factions which are all that remain of the once large population. Soon, Techotl invites Conan and Valeria into the stronghold of his tribe, the Tecuhltli, where are welcomed by the king and queen, Olmec and Tascela.

Olmec recounts that the city was built centuries before its current inhabitants arrived. One day, a slave—Tolkemec—betrayed his master and guided the newly arrived invaders into the city while slaying the original inhabitants. The conquerors were led by two brothers, Tecuhltli and Xotalanc, who ruled peacefully over their city until Tecuhltli stole Xotalanc's bride. Meanwhile, Tolkemec betrayed both sides for his own reasons and was exiled to the catacombs. Nails driven into a pillar inside of Olmec's stronghold keeps count the number of slain rivals, and provides the title for this story.

Tascela develops an interest in Valeria, and has a slave try to drug her with a narcotic plant. Valeria manages to capture the slave and interrogates her into revealing her mistress' treachery, but the slave escapes into the catacombs. Valeria's pursuit is interrupted when Xotalanc's army breaches the stronghold. Eventually, all of Xotalanc's troops are exterminated while Conan, Valeria, Olmec, Tascela, and fifteen Tecuhltli warriors remain alive. When Conan begins an expedition towards Xotalanc's stronghold, Valeria is left behind while her wounds are treated.

While Conan is away, Olmec tries to rape Valeria, but he is thwarted by Tascela. She reveals herself as a sorceress and the stolen bride who originally started the feud. Vampire-like, Tascela plans to sacrifice Valeria to restore her own youth. Olmec has secretly ordered his guards to execute Conan, but Conan kills the two warriors and hurries back for Valeria. Returning to Tecuhltli, Conan finds a bruised Olmec in a trap inside Tascela's dungeon. After rescuing him, Olmec attempts to betray Conan and is killed.

Conan faces off against Tascela, who has Valeria chained on an altar. Caught in a steel trap, Conan watches helplessly as Tascela proceeds with her ritual. Suddenly she is interrupted by Tolkemec, returned from his exile and wielding an ancient sceptre shooting lightning bolts. Desperate for assistance against her nemesis, Tascela releases Conan, who manages to grab the scepter and kill Tolkemec. After freeing herself, Valeria impales Tascela with a dagger through her heart, declaring, "I had to do that much for my self-respect!" With the last inhabitants of Xuchotl dead, Conan and Valeria depart the empty city and make for the pirate coast.

== Background ==
Robert E. Howard's stories often express the author's belief on how civilizations carry the seeds of their own destruction. Howard found in the lost city genre a vehicle for expressing these views. Howard's Puritan adventurer Solomon Kane explored the lost African city of Negari in "The Moon of Skulls", published in Weird Tales in 1930. In Howard's novella, one can discern the influence of She by H. Rider Haggard and the lost city of Opar which appears in the Tarzan novels by Edgar Rice Burroughs Howard's Negari is ruled by the seductive queen Nakari, recalling Haggard's Ayesha and Burroughs' La of Opar.

When Howard moved onto the Conan series, he began to place his own distinctive stamp on the lost city tale. In "Xuthal of the Dusk" (published in the September 1933 issue of Weird Tales as "The Slithering Shadow"), Conan and a female companion discover an inhabited lost city and encounter its resident femme fatale. Though not without merit, "Xuthal of the Dusk" is generally regarded as a second-rate Conan story. However, its themes such as the decadence of a stagnant and dying culture is clearly evident. "Xuthal" is commonly viewed as the direct precursor to "Red Nails".

The theme of cultural decadence maintained its grip on Howard's imagination. In early 1935, he remarked to Novalyne Price:

"You see, girl, when a civilization begins to decay and die, the only thing men or women think about is the gratification of their body's desires. They become preoccupied with sex. It colors their laws, their religion — every aspect of their lives.

[...]

"Girl, I'm working on a yarn like that now — a Conan yarn. Lauren to me. When you have a dying civilization, the normal, accepted life style ain't strong enough to satisfy the damned insatiable appetites of the courtesans and, finally, of all the people. They turn to Lesbianism and things like that to satisfy their desires...I am going to call it 'The Red Flame of Passion.'"

The idea that would become "Red Nails" continued to germinate in Howard's mind, and later that year he began the actual writing of the tale. It would be the last major fantasy story Howard would complete.

In 1935, Howard found himself burdened with medical expenses for the treatment of his ailing mother. Payment from Weird Tales was becoming increasingly unreliable. In early May, Howard wrote to his editor Farnsworth Wright, pleading for the money owed him. At that time, Weird Tales owed Howard over eight hundred dollars for stories already published, and payable upon publication. Wright had been paying Howard in a series of monthly installments, but these checks ceased just when Howard needed them most. Howard explained the circumstances surrounding his need and made it clear that he understood that Weird Tales was undergoing its own share of financial difficulties due to the Depression. However, he felt moved to state in no uncertain terms, "A monthly check from Weird Tales may well mean for me the difference between a life that is at least endurable and God alone knows what."

Howard received no immediate reply from Wright. A week later, he wrote to his agent, Otis Adelbert Kline, inquiring if Kline had any inside knowledge concerning the situation at the Weird Tales editorial offices. Howard was ultimately moved to concentrate on better-paying markets, primarily those for Western fiction. In a letter to H. P. Lovecraft he confided, "As for my own fantasy writing, whether or not I do any future work in that field depends a good deal on the editors themselves. I would hate to abandon weird writing entirely, but my financial needs are urgent, immediate and imperious. Slowness of payment in the fantastic field forces me into other lines against my will."

On July 22, 1935, Howard mailed his manuscript for "Red Nails" to Weird Tales. At the time, he shared his thoughts with Clark Ashton Smith, another colleague: "Sent a three-part serial to Wright yesterday: 'Red Nails,' which I devoutly hope he'll like. After Conan yarn, and the grimmest, bloodiest, and most merciless story of the series so far. Too much raw meat, maybe, but I merely portrayed what I honestly believe would be the reactions of certain types of people in the situations on which the plot of the story hung..."

Later in the year, Howard told Lovecraft, "The last yarn I sold to Weird Tales --and it well may be the last fantasy I'll ever write-- was a three-part Conan serial which was the bloodiest and most sexy weird story I ever wrote. I have been dissatisfied with my handling of decaying races in stories, for the reason that degeneracy is so prevalent in such races that it can not be ignored as a motive and as a fact if the fiction is to have any claim to realism. I have ignored it in all other stories, as one of the taboos, but I did not ignore it in this story..."

On the verge of abandoning fantasy for more commercial concerns, Howard devoted considerable thought and effort to his final allegorical statement.

== Reception ==
E. F. Bleiler placed "Red Nails" "among the better Conan stories," citing its "Extravagant adventure embodying a considerable amount of antiquarian lore and imagination."

== Publication history ==
The story was republished in the collections The Sword of Conan (Gnome Press, 1952) and Conan the Warrior (Lancer Books, 1967). It was first published by itself in book form by Donald M. Grant, Publisher in 1975 as volume IV of their deluxe Conan set. It has most recently been republished in the collections The Conan Chronicles Volume 2: The Hour of the Dragon (Gollancz, 2001) and The Conquering Sword of Conan (Del Rey, 2005) (published in the United Kingdom by Wandering Star as Conan of Cimmeria: Volume Three (1935-1936)), as well as The Best of Robert E. Howard, Volume 2: Grim Lands (Del Rey, 2007).

== Adaptations ==
The story was later adapted by Roy Thomas and Barry Windsor-Smith for issues #2-3 of the Marvel Comics magazine series Savage Tales. The Thomas/Smith tale was later reprinted in the 1987 black-and-white magazine Conan Saga issue #9 (Jan. 1988.) It has also been reprinted many times since then, both in black-and-white and in full color, by Marvel and more recently by Dark Horse. The story has also been adapted by publishing company Ablaze in their "Cimmerian" series of comics.

An unfinished and unreleased animated feature based on this story, Conan: Red Nails, went into production around 2005. Actor Ron Perlman was cast as providing the voice of Conan, while Tolkemec was to be voiced by Mark Hamill. The film was originally due to be released in 2010. However, production was stalled and since 2007 there have been no updates as to this film's status on its official website. IMDB still has the original listing for the (proposed) release of the film. Red Nails remains an unfinished film with no planned release.

== Sources ==
- Burke, Rusty. The Robert E. Howard Bookshelf. REHUPA. The Robert E. Howard Bookshelf
- Cerasini, Marc A and Charles Hoffman. (1987) Robert E. Howard. Mercer Island, WA; Starmont House.
- Ellis, Novalyne Price. (1986) One Who Walked Alone: Robert E. Howard: The Final Years. West Kingston, RI; Donald M. Grant, Publisher, Inc.
- Robert E. Howard Letter to Otis Adelbert Kline, May 6, 1935.
- Robert E. Howard Letter to H. P. Lovecraft, February 11, 1936.
- Robert E. Howard Letter to Clark Ashton Smith, July 23, 1935.
- Robert E. Howard Letter to Farnsworth Wright, May 6, 1935.
- (2005) "Red Nails", The Conquering Sword of Conan. New York: Del Rey. pp. 211–281.
- Louinet, Patrice. (2005) "Hyborian Genesis Part III", The Conquering Sword of Conan. New York: Del Rey. pp. 369–386.

Preceded by The Hour of the Dragon	Original Howard Canon (publication order)	Succeeded by "The Hyborian Age"
Preceded by "The Black Stranger"	Original Howard Canon (Dale Rippke chronology)	Succeeded by "Jewels of Gwahlur"
Preceded by The Tower of the Elephant	Grant Conan series (publication order)	Succeeded by The Devil in Iron
Preceded by Conan the Buccaneer	Complete Conan Saga (William Galen Gray chronology)	Succeeded by Conan and the Gods of the Mountain
