= King Conan =

Book by Robert E. Howard

- Cover of first edition
- Author: Robert E. Howard
- Language: English
- Series: Conan the Barbarian
- Genre: Sword and sorcery
- Publisher: Gnome Press
- Publication date: 1953
- Publication place: United States
- Media type: Print (hardback)

King Conan is a collection of five fantasy short stories by American writer Robert E. Howard featuring his sword and sorcery hero Conan the Barbarian. It is also the name of two separate comic book series featuring the character.

The book was first published in hardcover by Gnome Press in 1953. The stories originally appeared in the 1930s in the fantasy magazine Weird Tales. The collection never saw publication in paperback; instead, its component stories were divided and distributed among other "Conan" collections.

Chronologically, the five short stories collected as King Conan are the fourth in Gnome's Conan series; the novel Conan the Conqueror follows.

== Contents ==
- "Introduction" (L. Sprague de Camp)
  - July 1, 1931 note from H. P. Lovecraft to Robert E. Howard
- "Jewels of Gwahlur"
- "Beyond the Black River"
- "The Treasure of Tranicos" (edited/rewritten by de Camp from Howard's "The Black Stranger")
- "The Phoenix on the Sword"
- "The Scarlet Citadel"

== Comics ==
=== Marvel Comics ===
Marvel Comics published 55 issues of a King Conan series from 1980 to 1989 (retitled Conan the King from #20-onward).

=== Dark Horse Comics ===
Between 2011 and 2015, Dark Horse Comics published a new Conan comic book named King Conan. In this series the Cimmerian, now old and alone on his throne of Aquilonia, recalls his previous years adventures with a young royal scribe; his tales are set after he ascended to the throne. Dark Horse adapted a number of Howard's short stories plus The Hour of the Dragon:

- "The Scarlet Citadel" (2011)
- "The Phoenix On the Sword" (2012)
- "The Hour of the Dragon" (2013)
- "The Conqueror" (2014; originally, Dark Horse wanted to make 12 issues of The Hour of the Dragon; then they decided to split the story in two, publishing the second part with the alternate name of the novel.)
- "Wolves Beyond the Border" (2015)

== Reception ==
P. Schuyler Miller received the collection favorably, praising Howard's ability "to make the preposterous doings of his superhuman hero so real."

Everett F. Bleiler found that the original text of "The Black Stranger" "is much superior to the adaptation" provided here. He characterized the collection overall as "a weak selection", although singling out two scenes as effective.

== Film adaptation ==
A film adaptation is in development with Christopher McQuarrie set to write and direct, and Arnold Schwarzenegger reprising his role as Conan.

Preceded by The Sword of Conan	Gnome Conan series (chronological order)	Succeeded by Conan the Conqueror
