= The Phoenix on the Sword =

1932 Conan novelette by Robert E. Howard

- Short story by Robert E. Howard

Text available at Wikisource
- Country: United States
- Language: English
- Genre: Fantasy

Publication
- Published in: Weird Tales
- Publication type: Pulp magazine
- Publisher: Rural Publishing Corporation
- Publication date: December 1932

Chronology
- Series: Conan the Cimmerian
—	The Scarlet Citadel

"The Phoenix on the Sword" is one of the original short stories about Conan the Cimmerian written by American author Robert E. Howard and first published in Weird Tales magazine in December 1932. The tale, in which Howard created the character of Conan, was a rewrite of the unpublished Kull story "By This Axe I Rule!", with long passages being identical. The Conan version of the story was republished in the collections King Conan (Gnome Press, 1953) and Conan the Usurper (Lancer Books, 1967). It has most recently been republished in the collections The Conan Chronicles Volume 2: The Hour of the Dragon (Gollancz, 2001) and Conan of Cimmeria: Volume One (1932–1933) (Del Rey, 2003). It is set in the fictional Hyborian Age and details Conan foiling a plot to unseat him as king of Aquilonia.

== Plot summary ==
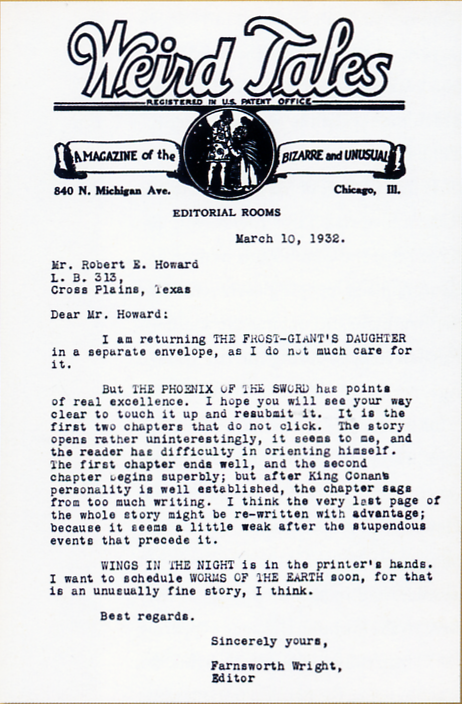
Letter from Farnsworth Wright, editor of Weird Tales, to Robert E. Howard

A middle-aged Conan of Cimmeria tries to govern the turbulent kingdom of Aquilonia.

Conan has recently seized the crown from King Numedides after strangling the tyrant on his throne, but the Cimmerian is more suited to swinging his broadsword than signing official documents. The Aquilonians who originally welcomed Conan as their liberator have turned against him due to his foreign blood, and construct a statue to Numedides' memory in the temple of Mitra; priests burn incense before their slain king, hailing it as the holy effigy of a saintly monarch who was killed by a red-handed barbarian.

A band known as the Rebel Four forms: Volmana, the dwarfish count of Karaban; Gromel, the giant commander of the Black Legion; Dion, the fat baron of Attalus; and Rinaldo, the hare-brained minstrel. Their goal is to put the crown in the hands of someone with royal blood, and to this end they recruit the services of a southern outlaw named Ascalante. However, Ascalante secretly plans to betray his employers and claim the crown. Ascalante also enslaves Thoth-Amon, a Stygian wizard who has fallen on hard times: A thief had stolen Thoth-Amon's ring and left him defenseless, forcing him to flee from Stygia; while disguised as a camel driver, he was waylaid in Koth by Ascalante's reavers. The rest of his caravan was slaughtered, but Thoth-Amon saved himself by revealing his identity and swearing to serve Ascalante.

The conspirators plan to assassinate King Conan when he is unprepared and defenseless, but Thoth-Amon discovers that his ring of power is in Dion's possession, murders him and summons a fanged ape-like demon to slay Ascalante. Conan in turn is warned of this event in a dream by a long-dead sage named Epemitreus, who marks Conan's sword with a mystical phoenix representing Mitra, a Hyborian god. Conan awakens and, prepared for the attack, slays the three remaining members of the Rebel Four, breaking his sword upon the helm of Gromel and using a battle-axe against the rest of his would-be assassins. Conan hesitates to kill Rinaldo, whose songs once touched the King's heart – this scruple proves costly, as Rinaldo manages to stab him before being killed. Ascalante, his goal in reach, moves to finish off the wounded king, but is killed by Thoth-Amon's demon before he can strike, and the demon is then slain by Conan with the shard of his enchanted sword.

Conan's courtiers hesitate to believe his tale, as the demon has evaporated, until they spot the shape its blood has left on the floor.

== Adaptation ==
Writer Roy Thomas and artists Vicente Alcázar and Yong Montano adapted the story in Conan the Barbarian Annual #2 (1976).

Writer Timothy Truman and artists Tomas Giorello and Jose Vilarrubia adapted the story in King Conan: The Phoenix on the Sword (2013).

== See also ==
- Robert E. Howard bibliography

Preceded by none	Original Howard Canon (publication order)	Succeeded by "The Scarlet Citadel"
Preceded by "Wolves Beyond the Border"	Original Howard Canon (Dale Rippke chronology)	Succeeded by "The Scarlet Citadel"
Preceded by Conan the Liberator	Complete Conan Saga (William Galen Gray chronology)	Succeeded by "The Scarlet Citadel"
