= Margaret Brundage =

American illustrator and painter (1900–1976)

- Margaret Brundage
- Born: December 9, 1900; Chicago, Illinois, U.S.
- Died: April 9, 1976 (aged 75)
- Education: McKinley High School
- Alma mater: Chicago Academy of Fine Arts
- Known for: Illustrating the pulp magazine Weird Tales
- Spouse: Myron "Slim" Brundage

Margaret Brundage (born Margaret Hedda Johnson; December 9, 1900 – April 9, 1976), was an American illustrator and painter who is remembered chiefly for having illustrated the pulp magazine Weird Tales. Working in pastels on illustration board, she created most of the covers for Weird Tales between 1933 and 1938.

== Early life ==
Brundage was born in Chicago, Illinois, of Swedish and Irish ancestry. Her father, Jonathan Emanuel Johnson, died when she was eight years old; she was raised by her mother Margaret Jane (Loutit) Johnson and grandmother Margaret (Houston) Loutit, for whom she was named, in a Christian Science household. Both her parents had come to Chicago from the Orkney Islands off the coast of Scotland. Brundage's mother remained both a widow and a devout Christian Scientist for the rest of her life, and supplemented their income by instructing beginning Christian Science disciples.

Margaret Hedda Johnson graduated from Girard Grammar School and attended McKinley High School in Chicago, where Walt Disney was a classmate ("I finished; he didn't", she later remarked). She graduated from McKinley in 1919. She was editor of the high school newspaper. Immediately after high school, Margaret worked providing illustrations for Chicago newspapers; she would draw fashion designs in both colour and in black-and-white, from ideas and descriptions provided by an agency. Her education continued at Art Institute of Chicago and the Chicago Academy of Fine Arts in the 1920s; she later stated that her failure to graduate was due to her inept lettering, though she continued her freelance work for the agency while she completed her coursework. During this period of the Prohibition, Margaret also worked at the Dill Pickle Club, a bohemian speakeasy affiliated with the Wobblies, where she met a sometime decorator and house painter nicknamed "Slim" due to his spare frame. This was Myron Reed Brundage, legendary writer, free thinker, and alleged womaniser.

In 1927, she married Brundage in Chicago. He was a former hobo, and later the founder of the College of Complexes. They had one son, Kerlyn Byrd Brundage (born August 27, 1927; died 1972), always called "Byrd". The marriage ended in divorce in 1939.

== Career ==
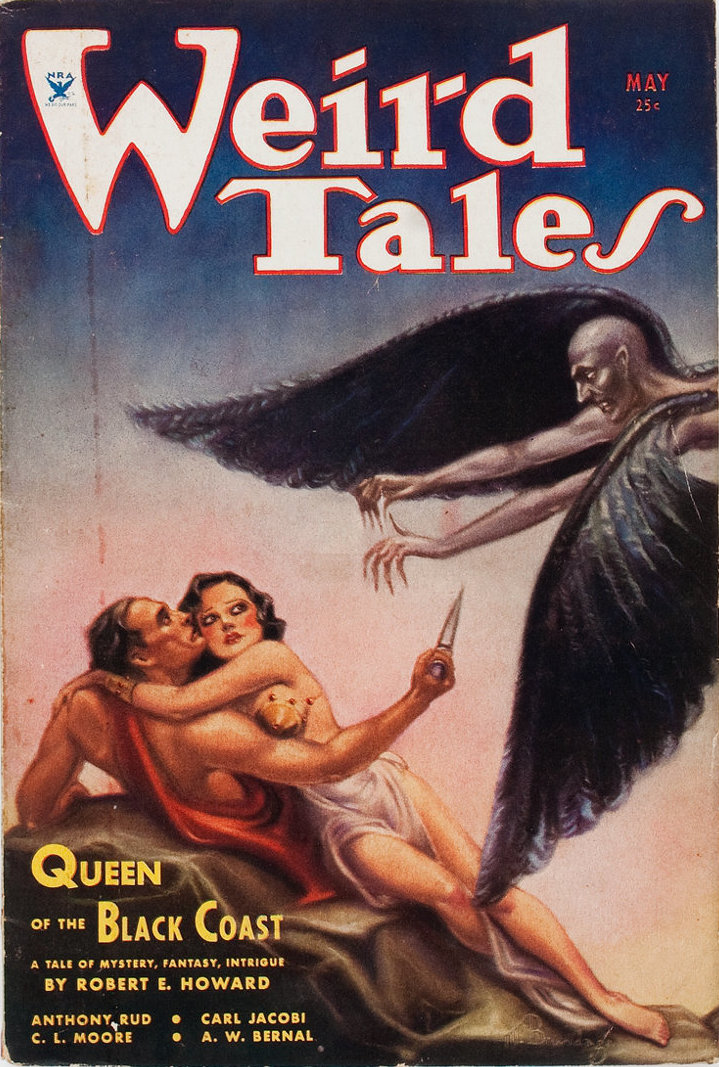
In Weird Tales, Brundage illustrates Robert E. Howard's Queen of the Black Coast, a story about Conan the Barbarian.

In 1932 Brundage was looking for more work, and found herself at the office of Farnsworth Wright, then editor of the weird fiction magazine Weird Tales. Brundage began working for Wright by doing a few covers for his side publication Oriental Stories, later known as The Magic Carpet. Wright was so impressed with these that he hired Brundage to draw for Weird Tales. Over the period from 1933 to 1938, Brundage executed cover art for Weird Tales. She was the most frequently-appearing cover artist on Weird Tales during her stint with the magazine. Her first cover appeared on the September 1932 issue; she created covers for 39 straight issues from June 1933 to August 1936. Her last original cover was for the January 1945 issue, for a total of 66 original-artwork covers. (The total of 67, often cited in sources, includes a repeat of that final 1945 cover on the November 1953 issue.) She was paid $90 per cover—enough to support herself, her son, and her invalid mother (died 1940). From 1936 through 1938, Brundage often alternated with others as cover artist; Virgil Finlay was her chief competitor.

Brundage's art frequently featured damsels in distress in various states of full or partial nudity; her whipping scenes were especially noteworthy and controversial. Her sensual images usually illustrated scenes from the pieces chosen by editor Farnsworth Wright as cover stories; her work was so popular among readers that some WT writers, like Seabury Quinn, cannily included scenes in their stories that would make good Brundage covers, since cover feature stories earned their authors more money.

Pulp covers were notorious for their explicit content, and Brundage's were no exception. During this time, it would have been seen as unacceptable for a woman to be creating such material so she signed her work "M. Brundage", to keep her identity in the dark for her readers. Complaints about the erotic nature of her work increased after October 1934, when editor Wright revealed that the "M." stood for "Margaret", disclosing that the artist was a woman. After 1938, when the magazine's editorial offices moved from Chicago to New York City, a new 'decency' standard was imposed (primarily through the efforts of then-mayor of New York Fiorello La Guardia) on pulp magazines sold at newsstands, and the nude or semi-nude young women that had been the primary subjects of Brundage's covers were out. Practical problems with shipping Brundage's fragile pastel art from Chicago to New York also diminished her appeal to the editorial regime that followed Wright's 1940 departure.

In 1939, Brundage painted two covers for Golden Fleece, a Chicago-based pulp magazine that specialized in historical fiction.

She continued to draw after her relationship with the magazine ended, and appeared at a number of science fiction conventions and art fairs, where some of her original period works were stolen. Yet she never fully recovered financially from the loss of regular work at WT; her later years were spent in relative poverty. She continued to work until her death.

== Reception ==
During her period as a Weird Tales cover artist, letters praising Brundage's work appeared in the magazine from Robert E. Howard, Henry Kuttner, and A. Merritt.

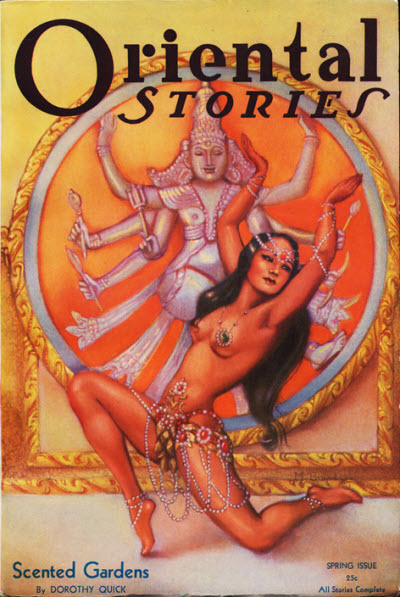
Brundage also did illustrations for Oriental Stories in the early 1930s.

L. Sprague de Camp is often quoted as claiming she used her daughters as models, but Brundage had no daughters. De Camp himself debunked the claim at one point, writing "About Margaret Brundage's luscious babes on the covers of Weird Tales, a rumor was once rife that Mrs. Brundage used her two daughters as models. Later she said she had no daughters and that, since she couldn't then afford professional models, she cut pictures from magazine advertisements for models. Hence the ubiquitous coiffures of the early 1930s." The claim had previously been refuted by Robert Weinberg, an authority on pulp magazines, who wrote in the letters page for Savage Tales magazine, No.5 (July 1974), "much as I hate to discredit a good story, WT cover artist Margaret Brundage did not have a daughter who posed for her. As Mrs. Brundage lives in Chicago and I have interviewed her, this is straight from the artist's mouth."

L. Sprague de Camp described the typical subject of her pictures as "naked heroines being tortured, raped, and disemboweled"; Forrest J. Ackerman similarly wrote of "Margaret Brundage, with her titillating pulchrinudes on the covers of Weird Tales: naked ladies being sacrificed, semi-clad heroines being menaced by all manner of monstrous beings."

Clark Ashton Smith was sharply critical of her illustrations. In December 1933 he wrote to H. P. Lovecraft: "The current W.T. design, though pleasing enough in color, is curiously suggestive of a Christmas card! [...] Mrs. Brundage [...] has about as much genuine feeling for the weird as a Jersey cow is likely to possess. The best angles in this picture (the hands of the Chinaman, etc) seem to have been swiped by unconscious cerebration from Utpatel's drawing for 'The Star-Spawn' by Derleth and Schorer." On September 9, 1937, he wrote to R. H. Barlow: "Query: why does Brundage try to make all her women look like wet-nurses? It's a funny, not to say tiresome, complex."

== Sources ==
- Stephen D. Korshak and J. David Spurlock, The Alluring Art of Margaret Brundage: Queen of Pulp Pin-Up Art. Foreword by Rowena (Vanguard/Shasta-Phoenix, 2013). ISBN 1-93433-151-1.
- L. Sprague de Camp. Lovecraft: a Biography. (Doubleday, 1975), ISBN 0-385-00578-4.
- R. Alain Everts, "Margaret Brundage", Etching & Odysseys 2 (53-61), 1983.
- Ray Russell, "Of Human Brundage". Playboy, Feb 1991 (vol 38, no. 2) pp. 106–109.
- Selected Letters of Clark Ashton Smith. Ed. Scott Connors and David E. Schulz (Arkham House, 2003), ISBN 0-87054-182-X.
