= Lancer Books =

Publisher of paperback books

- Status: Defunct (1973)
- Founded: 1961
- Founder: Irwin Stein and Walter Zacharius
- Successor: Kensington Books
- Country of origin: United States
- Headquarters location: 26 West 47th Street; later 185 Madison Avenue, New York City, New York
- Key people: Larry Shaw; Robert Hoskins
- Publication types: Books
- Fiction genres: Science fiction, fantasy

Lancer Books was a publisher of paperback books founded by Irwin Stein and Walter Zacharius that operated from 1961 through 1973. While it published stories of a number of genres, it was noted most for its science fiction and fantasy, particularly its 12 book series of Robert E. Howard's Conan the Barbarian tales, the first publication of many in paperback format. It published the controversial novel Candy by Terry Southern and Mason Hoffenberg, and Ted Mark's ribald series The Man from O.R.G.Y. Lancer paperbacks had a distinctive appearance, many bearing mauve or green page edging.

== History ==
=== The founders: Stein and Zacharius ===
Walter Zacharius was a Brooklyn native who served in the Army in World War II, taking part in D-Day and the liberation of Paris. In the 1940s and 50s he worked with Macfadden Publications, for magazines like True Confessions and True Story. Later, he moved to Ace Books, where he helped publisher A. A. Wyn create the Ace Double Novels line of paperbacks.

After working for a Chicago newspaper, in 1949 Irwin Stein returned to New York, where he wrote comic book scripts for Quality Comics (Doll Man, Plastic Man) and Hillman Periodicals before employment as the comic book editor with St. John Publications. In 1954, Stein and his wife Helen began a magazine company, Royal Publications, which published the pulp magazines Our Life and Celebrity from Royal's East 44th Street offices. During 1955, Stein added the magazines Infinity Science Fiction and Suspect Detective Stories (which became Science Fiction Adventures with its fifth issue). During 1958–59, Stein published two monster magazines, Monster Parade and Monsters and Things.

=== Foundation of Lancer ===
As various genre magazines became less common, Stein decided to close down Royal Publications and begin publishing paperback originals. He and Zacharius launched Lancer Books in June 1961 at 26 West 47th Street. Larry Shaw, who had edited Infinity Science Fiction and Royal's monster magazines, returned as the editor of Lancer Books in 1963. It was Shaw who negotiated the Conan series in 1966. When Shaw left in 1968, his replacement as editor was Robert Hoskins. In 1970, Hoskins and Stein brought Infinity back as a series of paperback anthologies, labeled "a magazine of speculative fiction in book form."

Lancer Books imprints include: Domino (adults-only), Oracle Books (soft-porn), and Valentine Books (romance).

=== Bankruptcy and Kensington Books ===
The company filed for bankruptcy in September 1973. In 1974, Zacharius and Roberta Bender Grossman co-founded Kensington Books (with the Zebra Books and Pinnacle Books imprints following shortly). Kensington was initially known mostly for romance novels.

== Genres ==
Cover of Ted White's Phoenix Prime (Lancer Books, 1966), illustrated by Frank Frazetta.

Lancer's science fiction and science-fantasy books were noted for the frequent use of cover art by Frank Frazetta. Frazetta began doing covers for Lancer with John Benyon Harris's The Secret People (1964) and Ted White's Phoenix Prime (1966), and later did covers for eight of the twelve books in Lancer's Conan series.

In addition to science fiction and heroic fantasy, Lancer published private detective adventures with sexual themes, true crime and espionage stories, plus Gothic fiction such as Shadows (1970) by Jan Alexander (pseudonym for Victor J. Banis). Lesbian fiction authors published by Lancer included Rea Michaels (Duet in Darkness, Cloak of Evil), Sylvia Sharon (pseudonym used by Paul Little) and Florence Stonebraker.

Lancer Books published paperback editions of classic novels, reprinting public domain works. This series was designated Magnum Easy Eye Books, as the typography of the books was larger, enabling readers to avoid eye strain. Among the authors represented in this series were H. G. Wells, Jules Verne, Rudyard Kipling, Samuel Clemens, Charles Dickens, Robert Louis Stevenson, Jane Austen, Helen Keller and Bram Stoker. Besides the complete and unabridged text, each book included a brief, unsigned biographical article about the author. Because the works were in the public domain, Lancer included a copyright notice for the special contents (i.e., the biographical information) for each book.

Lancer also published books of social commentary, such as The Angry Black, edited by John Williams. Lancer's popular culture titles included The Beatle Book (1964). In 1971, Lancer published Broom-Hilda, a collection of the eponymous comic strips by Russell Myers.
