= Adaptations of works by Robert E. Howard =

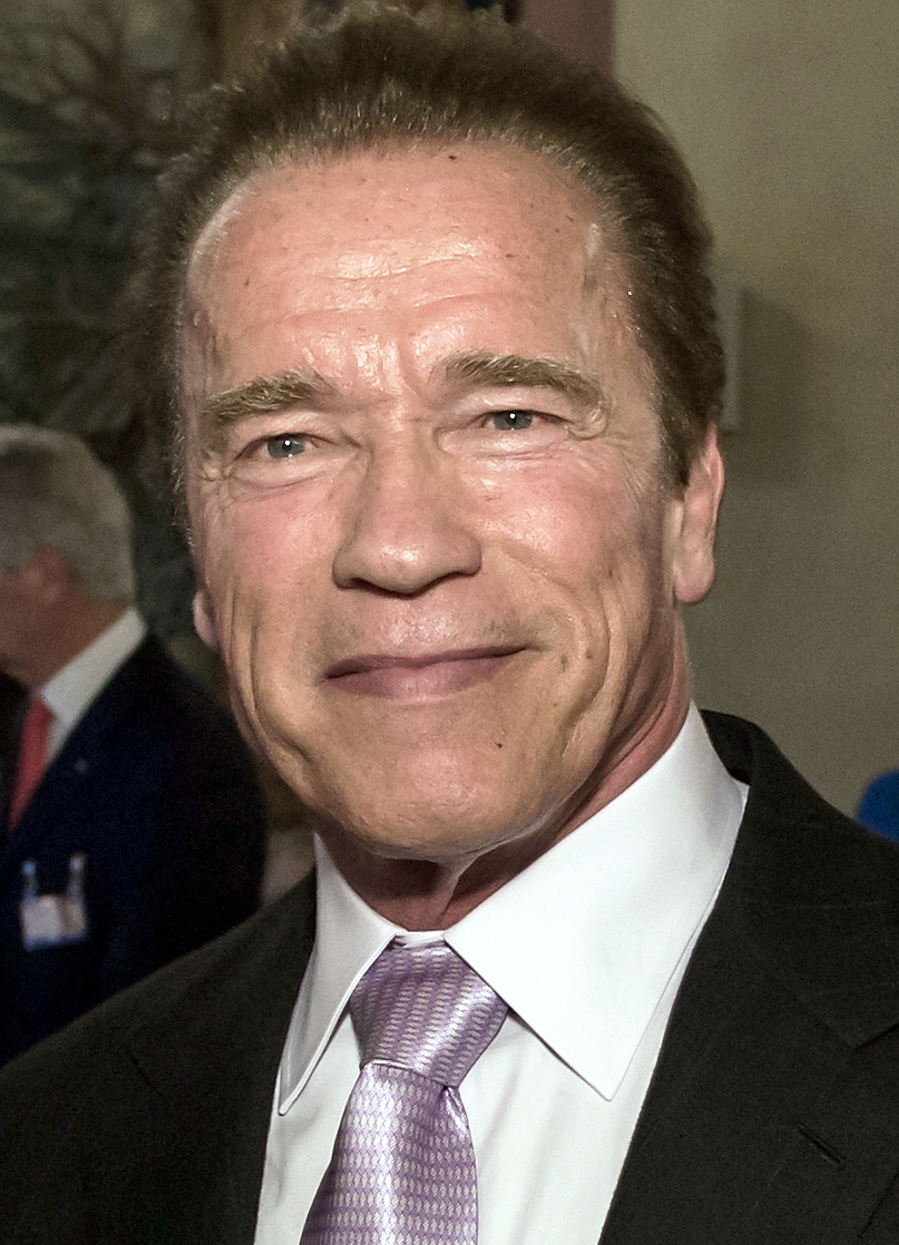
Arnold Schwarzenegger starred in two Howard based films and a Howard-inspired film.

The works of Robert E. Howard (1906–1936) have been adapted into multiple media, the most famous being the Conan films starring Arnold Schwarzenegger. In addition to the Conan films, other adaptations have included Kull the Conqueror (1997) and Solomon Kane (2009). In television, the anthology series Thriller (1961) led the adaptations with an episode based on the short story "Pigeons from Hell." The bulk of the adaptations have, however, been based on Conan with two animated and one live action series. Multiple audio dramas have been adapted, from professional audio books and plays to LibriVox recordings of works in the public domain. Computer games have focussed on Conan, beginning with Conan: Hall of Volta (1984) and continuing on to the MMO Age of Conan: Hyborian Adventures (2008). The first table-top roleplaying game based on Howard's works was TSR's "Conan Unchained!" (1984) for their game Advanced Dungeons & Dragons. The first comic book adaptation was in the Mexican Cuentos de abuelito - La reina de la Costa Negra #8 (1952). Howard-related comic books continued to be published to the present day. Howard is an ongoing inspiration for and influence on heavy metal music. Several bands have adapted Howard's works to tracks or entire albums. The British metal band Bal-Sagoth is named after Howard's story "The Gods of Bal-Sagoth."

== Film ==
Five films have been based on Howard's works: Conan the Barbarian (1982), Conan the Destroyer (1984), both starring Arnold Schwarzenegger; Kull the Conqueror (1997), starring Kevin Sorbo; Solomon Kane (2010); and Conan the Barbarian (2011) starring Jason Momoa. Another film, Red Sonja (1985), was based on a character created by Roy Thomas and Barry Windsor-Smith who had in turn based the character on a conflation of various Howard characters. A script for a third Conan film, called King Conan: Crown of Iron, was written in 2002 by John Milius. This film was to have again starred Arnold Schwarzenegger as an older Conan, now king of Aquilonia, alongside his adult son. The Wachowskis were reported as interested in producing the script but these plans were cancelled when Schwarzenegger became Governor of California in 2003. Howard himself was played by Vincent D'Onofrio in the 1996 biographical film The Whole Wide World, based on the books One Who Walked Alone and Day of the Stranger by Novalyne Price Ellis.

Several further movies were at one time in development. Conan: Red Nails, a direct-to-DVD animated version of "Red Nails" was announced in 2005. Ron Perlman was cast as Conan with Cree Summer as Valeria. Peter Berg was signed up in 2008 as the director of a film based on and titled Bran Mak Morn. Vultures, based on the novella "The Vultures of Wahpeton" was announced in 2006 and expected to be released in 2011.

In 2003, a short film adaptation of Howard's short story "Casonetto's Last Song", directed by Brenda Dau and Derek M. Koch, was featured as an official selection of the H. P. Lovecraft Film Festival.

== Television ==
The first Howard adaptation was not Conan related, although all subsequent examples were. Howard's short horror story "Pigeons from Hell" was adapted for television as an episode of the anthology series Thriller airing in 1961.

In the 1990s, Conan was adapted into two animated series. The first, Conan the Adventurer debuted in 1992 as a syndicated series created by Jetlag Productions, Graz Entertainment and Sunbow Productions. The second animated series, Conan and the Young Warriors, was produced by Sunbow for CBS television picked up from plot threads in the first series and was released in 1993. The second series was not a success and only lasted for 13 episodes.

A live-action syndicated series, called Conan the Adventurer, was released in 1997. The series starred Ralf Möller as Conan, with plot elements from the Schwarzenegger films, albeit toned down for a television audience; one 22-episode season was produced.

== Audio drama ==
An Austin, Texas, based radio drama recreation troupe, the Violet Crown Radio Players, have released numerous radio-play adaptations of Howard's "Sailor Steve Costigan" stories. These were adapted by Howard biographer Mark Finn, who also played the part of Steve Costigan.

LibriVox hosts several audiobooks of public domain Howard stories, including the some Breckinridge Elkins and Solomon Kane stories in addition to Conan. (Note: All LibriVox recordings can be found at LibriVox.org and should be available on Wikimedia Commons. All LibriVox recordings are in the public domain.)

New Zealand based non-profit audio drama group Broken Sea Audio Productions have recorded several Howard-related productions., including dramatic reading of Queen of the Black Coast and Red Nails as well as a full-cast audio drama version of Hour of the Dragon. However, in February 2009, Paradox Entertainment used New Zealand copyright laws to prevent further BrokenSea productions.

Official audiobooks of the Del Rey Books are being released by Tantor Media. These include Kull: Exile Of Atlantis read by Todd McLaren, The Savage Tales Of Solomon Kane (2010) read by Paul Boehmer and The Horror Stories of Robert E. Howard read by Robertson Dean.

In Germany, a German-language audio dramatisation of "Pigeons from Hell" (as "Tauben aus der Hölle") has been released by the label Titania-Medien in early 2011. The release of an audio dramatisation of "The Horror from the Mound" (as "Der Grabhügel") is scheduled for release in March 2012, followed by a dramatisation of "Black Talons" (as "Schwarze Krallen") in November 2012.

== Computer games ==
The first Conan computer game was Conan: Hall of Volta (1984), released by Datasoft for the Apple II and Commodore 64. This was followed by Conan: The Mysteries of Time (1991). This game was released by Mindscape, Inc. for the Nintendo Entertainment System, a Commodore 64 port by System 3. Another Conan game was released in the same year; Conan: The Cimmerian (1991) was developed by Synergistic Software and released by Virgin Interactive for Amiga and DOS computers. It was a roleplaying-style game based more on the Schwarzenegger films rather than the original Howard material.

Two Conan-based third-person action games were released in the early 21st century. The first, Conan (2004), by TDK Mediactive for Windows and consoles, was only released in Europe. The second, also called Conan (2007), by THQ and Nihilistic for PlayStation 3 and Xbox 360, had a wider release.

The Massively Multiplayer Online Role-Playing Game (MMORPG) Age of Conan: Hyborian Adventures was developed by Norwegian company Funcom and released in 2008 by Eidos Interactive on PC. The game received "generally favorable reviews". Seth Schiesel, writing for The New York Times, felt that the development of the game would have benefited from a few extra months of production, and that the game had "at least the potential to become the best new massively multiplayer game since World of Warcraft."

== Role-playing games ==
In tabletop role-playing games, the first Howard adaptation was again a Conan property. In 1984, TSR released two movie tie-in modules for Advanced Dungeons & Dragons: Conan Unchained! (by David Cook) and Conan Against Darkness! (by Ken Rolston). These were so successful that TSR released a separate game, Conan Role-Playing Game, in 1985, followed by three modules: Conan the Buccaneer (by Kim Eastland), Conan the Mercenary (Eastland) and Conan Triumphant (by William Carlson). TSR also released three Endless Quest books: Conan the Undaunted (by James M. Ward), Conan and the Prophecy (by Roger E. Moore) and Conan the Outlaw (Moore).

In 1986, Steve Jackson Games released its GURPS generic system and two years later, in 1988, acquired a license for a Conan role-playing game. In that same year its first Conan publication was the solo adventure Conan: Beyond Thunder River, written by W. G. Armintrout. As with the TSR game, this proved popular enough so that SJ Games released GURPS Conan, written by Curtis Scott and first published in 1989, a core rulebook constituting a GURPS standalone supplement by its own. Also in 1989, SJ Games continued publishing solo adventures with titles that completed the line started in 1988 by Conan: Beyond Thunder River: Conan: Moon of Blood (Armintrout, 1989), Conan: The Wyrmslayer (Armintrout, 1989) and Conan and the Queen of the Black Coast (Robert Traynor, 1989).

After having acquired a Conan license in 2003, the British editor Mongoose Publishing released Conan: The Roleplaying Game in January 2004, a game mainly written by Ian Sturrock. A few months later, in August 2004, an updated "Atlantean Edition" was released and finally, in September 2007, the second and last edition of the game saw light of day. The game used the d20 System under the Open Game License. Multiple supplements were released for this game.

Pinnacle Entertainment Group released Savage World of Solomon Kane in 2007, written by Paul Wade-Williams and Shane Lacy Hensley. This game was based on the company's Savage Worlds game system.

== Other games ==
In other gaming, Comic Images released the Conan Collectible Card Game (2006) designed by Jason Robinette. Fantasy Flight Games released the Age of Conan (2009) strategy board game, depicting warfare between the Hyborian nations.

== Comic books ==
The first comic book adaptation of a Howard story was the feature La reina de la Costa Negra (taken from the original Conan story, Queen of the Black Coast) in the miniature-size Mexican anthology title Cuentos de Abuelito #8 (1952) published by Corporacion Editorial Mexicana, SA. The series features the main characters, Conan and Bêlit, though Conan is depicted as a blonde rather than black-haired. Issues 8 through 12 adapted the original Howard story, while subsequent issues featured original material. The feature ran in nearly every issue of Cuentos de Abuelito up through number 61. " A digest-sized standalone La reina de la Costa Negra series was published by Ediciones Mexicanas Asocidas in 1958-1959 which lasted for at least eleven issues. In 1965-66 Ediciones Joma published a standard-size La reina de la Costa Negra comic that ran for at least 53 issues.

The first English-language comic book adaptation of a Howard story was in Star Studded Comics #14 (December 1968) which adapted "Gods of the North" (otherwise known as the Conan story "The Frost-Giant's Daughter").

Both Howard and H.P. Lovecraft were tremendous influences for Mike Mignola and his Hellboy series.

== Music ==
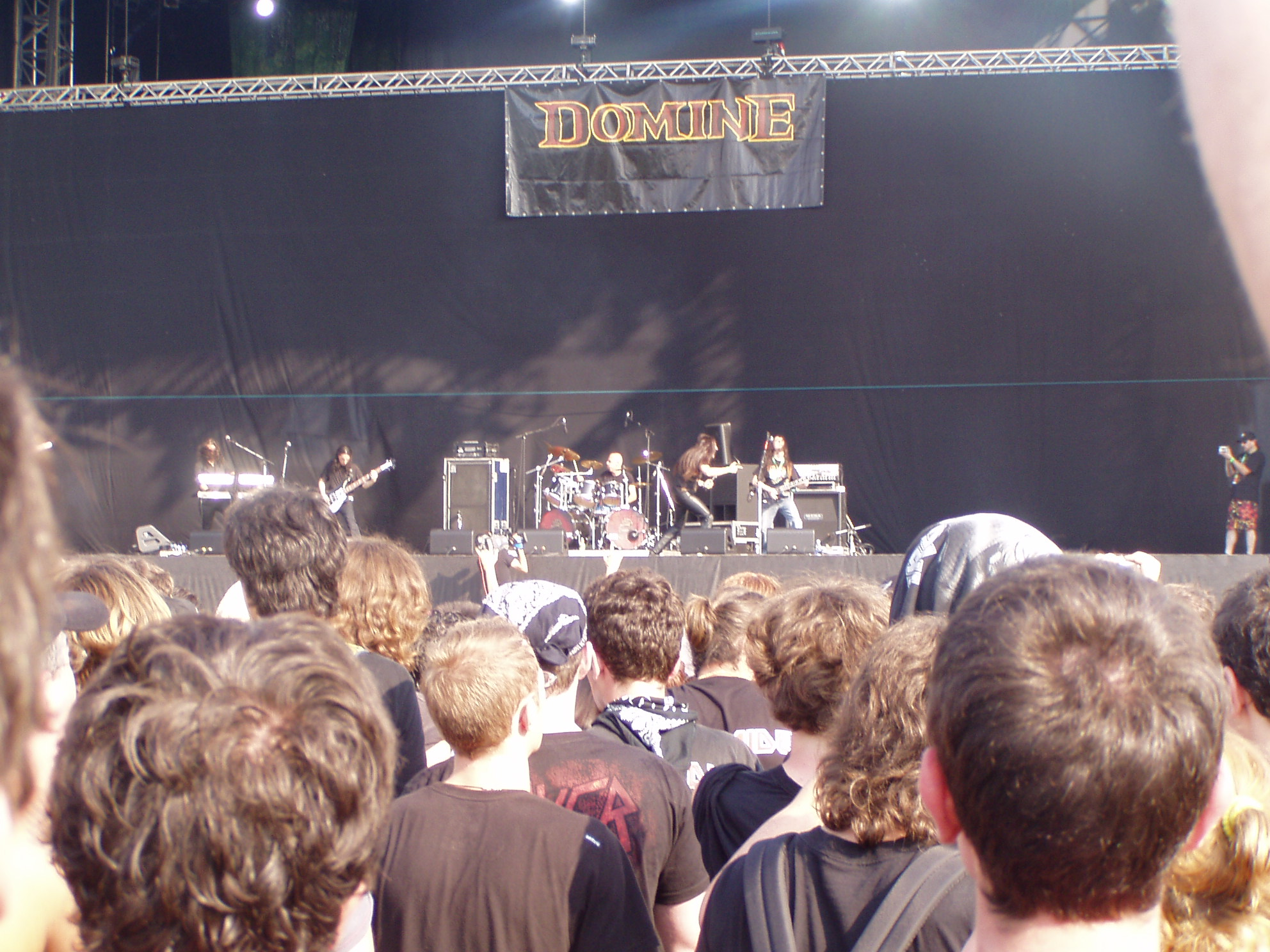
Italian metal band Domine at the Heineken Jammin' Festival 2007. The band is one of several to have released Howard-inspired tracks.

Howard is an ongoing inspiration for and influence on heavy metal. Domine's album Emperor of the Black Runes (2003) includes the Conan-inspired "Aquilonia Suite." Italian metal band Rosae Crucis released the concept album Worms of the Earth (2003) which is entirely based on Howard's Bran Mak Morn story of the same name. Ironsword's album Return of the Warrior (2004) includes "Nemedian Chronicles" and "Way of the Barbarian." Greek metal band Battleroar's Age of Chaos (2005) includes two Conan inspired tracks, "Tower of the Elephant" and "The Sword of Crom." Manilla Road have recorded several Howard-related tracks across multiple albums, including "Queen of the Black Coast" (Metal, 1982); "Road of Kings" and "Hour of the Dragon" (Open the Gates, 1985); "The Books of Skelos" (The Courts of Chaos, 2001); and a trilogy based on "The Frost-Giant's Daughter" - "Riddle of Steel," "Behind the Veil" and "When Giants Fall" (Gates of Fire, 2005). French band Mad Minstrel have similarly released multiple tracks over different albums, all based on Howard's poetry, including "The Gates of Nineveh" and "The Riders of Babylon" (Fallen Cities, 2001); "Black Chant Imperial," "To a Woman" and "Which Will Scarcely be Understood" (Prelude To Hate, 2003).

The British metal band Bal-Sagoth is named after Howard's story "The Gods of Bal-Sagoth." Bal-Sagoth have no individual tracks based on Howard's work but instead incorporate Howardian themes into their music. Vocalist and writer Byron Roberts has said "Howard and Lovecraft were powerful inspirations for me when I was coming up with the concept and thematic basis for this band. I wanted to create songs, which were infused with the dark essence of the 1930s pulp fantasy, which I love so much, creating my own baroque fantasy world within which all the band's songs would take place. And in tribute to those classic works of literature and that enduring, oft-maligned genre, I decided to call the band Bal-Sagoth."

== Stage shows ==
Based on the success of the 1982 film, Universal created a live-action show, The Adventures of Conan: A Sword and Sorcery Spectacular, that ran from 1983 to 1993 at Universal Studios Hollywood. Produced at a cost of $5 million, the 20-minute show featured action scenes executed to music composed by Basil Poledouris. The show's highlights were pyrotechnics, lasers, and an 18 feet (5.5 m) tall animatronic dragon that breathed fire.

In 2013, the first dramatic on-stage version of 'Conan the Barbarian' - a Play based on the stories of Robert E.Howard - made its premiere in Tasmania, Australia. The Play, presented by Stephen Beckett Productions, featured four of Howard's characters - Conan, Valeria, Zorathus and Tascela - and incorporated live sword-fighting.

In 1985, Yngwie Malmsteen's Rising Force filmed their first video on the set of The Adventures of Conan, making use of the pyrotechnics and other effects, as well as adding some of his own. The video was for the single "I'll See the Light" from their album "Marching Out".

== Footnotes ==
=== Sources ===
- Finn, Mark (2006), Blood & Thunder, Monkeybrain, Inc., ISBN 1-932265-21-X
- Fleming, Michael (11 June 2009), "Marcus Nispel to direct 'Conan' remake", Variety, archived from the original on 20 June 2009
- Hall, Scott (June 2007), Grin, Leo (ed.), "An Iron Harp Played Through a Marshall Amp", The Cimmerian, 4 (3): 4–11, ISSN 1548-3398
- Herman, Paul (2006), The Neverending Hunt (PDF), Wildside Press, ISBN 978-0-8095-6256-5, archived from the original (PDF) on 2012-04-01
- Koppl, Rudy; Poledouris, Basil (July 2, 2009), "Basil Poledouris: A Man and His Music", CinemaScore · Soundtrack · Archives, archived from the original on 2011-08-03 This interview was originally published in Soundtrack!. 16 (64). Belgium: Luc Van de Ven. December 1997. ISSN 0771-6303.
- Lord, Glenn (1976), The Last Celt, Berkley Windhover Books, ISBN 978-0-425-03630-3
- Moleski, Linda, ed. (October 5, 1985), "Video Track", Billboard, vol. 97, no. 40, New York, NY: Billboard Publications, p. 36A, ISSN 0006-2510
- McKenzie, Steven (3 October 2008), "Hollywood tackles 'King of Picts'", BBC News
- Sammon, Paul M. (2007), Conan the Phenomenon, Dark Horse Books, ISBN 978-1-59307-653-5
- Shanks, Jeffrey (Spring 2013), "La reina de la Costa Negra: The Mystery of the Mexican Conan Comics", Comic Book Quarterly (11): 3–6, archived from the original on 2014-03-12
- Schiesel, Seth (4 June 2008), ""At Play in a World of Savagery, but Not This One"", The New York Times
- Thom, William; Herman, Paul; Woods, Todd, Howardworks
- Weiner, Stephen; Hall, Jason; Blake, Victoria; Mignola, Mike (2006), The Hellboy Companion, Dark Horse Comics, ISBN 978-1-59307-655-9
- Willis, Jesse (24 February 2009), Conan Attacks Fans, SFFaudio
- "Age of Conan: Hyborian Adventures (PC)", Metacritic
- Robert E. Howard's Conan: Red Nails, Swordplay Entertainment, archived from the original on 29 May 2012
- Robert E. Howard, Tantor Media
- Universal Studios (June 24, 1983), "Movie Making Magic", The Enterprise Newspapers, Washington, DC: The Herald's staff, p. 10A
