= List of games based on Conan the Barbarian =

The Conan the Barbarian saga has appeared in a variety of forms in the gaming community from simple boardgames to high tech multiplayer online games. The intention of all these games is to immerse the player in the sword and sorcery world of Hyboria. Robert E. Howard created the original Conan story but he had no hand in creating various games other than they were based on his works.

== Board games ==
=== Collectible card game ===
Hyborian Gates is a collectible trading card game.

=== Board games ===
- Hyborian Risk is an unofficial variant for the Risk boardgame based on the Conan mythos, published in The Space Gamer magazine in issue 37 (March, 1981).
- Age of Conan: The Strategy Board Game is a board game published by Fantasy Flight Games (2009)
- Conan (2016) is a board game with miniatures, published in 2016 by Monolith and Asmodee. One player controls the evil creatures (Necromancer, Picts, monsters, etc.) and the other players control Conan and his companions. The game launched through Kickstarter in January 2015, and released worldwide in November 2016. Numerous supplements rounded out the entire Conan mythos, through several more Kickstarter campaigns (2017, 2018, 2021, 2024).
  - Conan: Baal-pteor
  - Conan: Black Dragons
  - Conan: The Black Ones
  - Conan: Book of Set
  - Conan: Brom guest box
  - Conan: Crossbowmen
  - Conan: Demon of the Earth
  - Conan: Dragon
  - Conan: Giant Wolves
  - Conan: Khitai
  - Conan: Kushite Witch Hunters
  - Conan: The Legend of the Devil in Iron
  - Conan: The Monolith Sourcebook
  - Conan: Nordheim
  - Conan: The Overlord I
  - Conan: Paolo Parente guest box
  - Conan: Sabertooth Tiger
  - Conan: Stygia
  - Conan: Vanir Valkyrie
  - Conan: Xavier Collette guest box
  - Conan: Yogah of Yag
  - Conan the Conqueror
  - Conan the Conqueror: Hidden Chambers
  - Conan the Conqueror: Tome of Skelos
  - Conan the Conqueror: The Shadow Kingdom
  - Conan the Conqueror: Tales of the Red Brotherhood
  - Conan: Red Nails
  - Conan: Red Nails: Frank Frazetta box
  - Conan: Red Nails: Versus Mode
  - Conan: Red Nails: Worms of the Earth

== Role-playing games ==
=== Earliest Appearances ===
Conan's first appearance in Dungeons & Dragons with game statistics was in Supplement IV: Gods, Demi-Gods & Heroes (TSR, 1976), in a section of the book devoted to ROBERT E. HOWARD'S HYBOREA.

Conan was defined by Gary Gygax for the first time for Dungeons & Dragons in his article "Conan!", an installment of Gygax's regular "From the Sorcerer's Scroll" column, in The Dragon Magazine #36 (April 1980).

=== Conan (D&D supplements) ===
Capitalizing on the release of the Conan movies, TSR created two licensed Conan adventures for their Dungeons & Dragons role-playing game in 1984. The line sold very poorly and in time was discontinued; the adventures (called "modules" in the Dungeons & Dragons community) often found their way to the bargain bin in most hobby shops but are now often prized by collectors.

- CB1 Conan Unchained!
- CB2 Conan Against Darkness!
- RS1 Red Sonja Unconquered (Although not strictly based on Conan, it features a female character adventuring through the lands of the Hyborian Age, as featured in the Conan stories).

=== Conan Role-Playing Game ===
The Conan Role-Playing Game was published by TSR, Inc. in 1985. This boxed game was designed for players age 10 and up contained a full-color map, a 32-page will book, a 16-page reference guide and a 48-page notebook about the land of Hyboria plus two 10 sided dice. The series was very short-lived producing only three adventures each based on novels from the Conan series.

Supplements:

- CN1 Conan the Buccaneer
- CN2 Conan the Mercenary
- CN3 Conan Triumphant

=== GURPS Conan ===
GURPS Conan for the GURPS roleplaying system was produced in 1989 by Steve Jackson Games. The other GURPS Conan books were GURPS solo adventures and started a year before, with GURPS Conan: Beyond Thunder River

Supplements:

- GURPS Conan: Beyond Thunder River (1988)
- GURPS Conan and the Queen of the Black Coast (1989)
- GURPS Conan: Moon of Blood (1989)
- GURPS Conan the Wyrmslayer (1989)

=== Conan: The Roleplaying Game ===
Conan: The Roleplaying Game, by Mongoose Publishing, was published under the Open Game License using a custom adaptation of the d20 System. The game comprises a 352-page rulebook (a second edition was expanded to 424 pages) and various add-on adventures and sourcebooks for both the first and second editions.

- Conan: The Roleplaying Game (hardcover, 352 pages, January 2004)
- Conan: The Roleplaying Game (Atlantean Edition, hardcover, 352 pages, August 2004: revised and corrected second printing of the original edition)
- Conan: The Roleplaying Game (Pocket Edition, softcover, January 2005)
- Conan: The Roleplaying Game (2nd Edition, hardcover, 424 pages, September 2007)

Supplements:

- Across the Thunder River
- Adventures in the Hyborian Age (2nd Edition)
- Aquilonia - Flower of the West
- Argos and Zingara
- Bestiary of the Hyborian Age (2nd Edition)
- Betrayer of Asgard (2nd Edition)
- The Black Stones of Kovag-Re
- Catacombs of Hyboria (2nd Edition)
- Cimmeria (2nd Edition)
- Cities of Hyboria (2nd Edition)
- The Coming of Hanuman
- The Compendium
- Faith and Fervour
- The Free Companies
- Game Master's Screen
- The Heretics of Tarantia
- Hyboria's Fallen - Pirates, Thieves and Temptresses
- Hyboria's Fiercest - Barbarians, Borderers and Nomads
- Hyboria's Finest - Nobles, Scholars and Soldiers
- Khitai (2nd Edition)
- The Lurking Terror of Nahab
- Messantia - City of Riches
- The Pirate Isles
- Player's Guide to the Hyborian Age (2nd Edition)
- Reavers of the Vilayet
- Return to the Road of Kings (The Road of Kings 2nd Edition)
- The Road of Kings
- Ruins of Hyboria
- The Scrolls of Skelos
- The Secrets of Skelos (The Scrolls of Skelos 2nd Edition)
- Shadizar - City of Wickedness
- Shem - Gateway to the South
- Stygia - Serpent of the South
- Tales of the Black Kingdoms
- Tito's Trading Post
- The Tower of the Elephant
- Trial of Blood (2nd Edition)
- The Warrior's Companion (2nd Edition)

=== Robert E. Howard's Conan: Adventures in an Age Undreamed Of ===
Conan: Adventures in an Age Undreamed Of, by Modiphius Entertainment, was officially licensed from Conan Properties Inc. The main game consisted of a 368-page full colour hardcover book using their 2d20 system. The game was launched in 2017 through a successful Kickstarter crowd-funding campaign, and a number of supplements followed. The line ended in 2022 when the license was transferred to Monolith.

- Player's Guide
- Conan the Thief
- Perilous Ruins & Forgotten Cities
- Blessing of Mitra
- Conan the Barbarian
- Conan the Mercenary
- The Book of Skelos
- Jeweled Thrones of the Earth
- Forbidden Places & Pits of Horror
- Conan the Pirate
- Horrors of the Hyborian Age
- Conan the Brigand
- Nameless Cults
- Ancient Ruins & Cursed Cities

=== Conan: The Hyborian Age ===
Following a successful Kickstarter in 2024, Paris-based game company Monolith Board Games launched a new licensed Conan RPG in English and French.

This release featured several products:

- The Core Book
- Tales of the Hyborian Age: Volume 1 (a campaign consisting of seven episodic adventures)
- Tales of the Hyborian Age: Volume 2 (eleven short prewritten scenarios)
- GM Screen and Game Master’s Companion booklet

A second Kickstarter in 2026, “Conan by Monolith: Tales of Tortage and Zamora” included two new supplements: Upon a Blood Red Tide and Shadows of Zamora and new miniatures.

== Miniatures and strategy games ==
Royal Armies of the Hyborean Age is a wargame published by Fantasy Games Unlimited in 1975. Designed by Scott Bizar and Lin Carter. See the Board Game Geek entry for more details.

Hyborian War is a play-by-mail strategy game published by Reality Simulations as of 1985. The game gives players strategic control of a Hyborian nation.

There is also an Age of Conan Strategy Board Game published by Nexus Editrice.

== Video games ==
=== Conan: Hall of Volta ===
Conan: Hall of Volta was released for the Apple II, Atari 8-bit computers, and Commodore 64 in 1984.

=== Conan: The Mysteries of Time ===
A version of the game Myth: History in the Making programmed by System 3 was rebranded as Conan: The Mysteries of Time and released for the Nintendo Entertainment System. Published by Mindscape in 1990, this was a side scrolling game reminiscent of Castlevania.

=== Conan: The Cimmerian ===
This version was released for MS-DOS and Amiga in 1991 by Virgin Games, Inc.

=== Conan (2004) ===
Conan (2004) is a third-person perspective action adventure developed by Cauldron Software and published by TDK in 2004, "Conan - The Dark Axe" was a lengthy tale that saw Conan visit and fight in nearly all parts of the Hyborian world. The game was based primarily on R. E. Howard's stories but also paid homage to John Milius's movie, as well as to some of the Conan tales written by Lin Carter and Lyon Sprague de Camp.

=== Conan (2007) ===
For the Xbox 360 and Sony PlayStation 3. It was released in the US on October 23, 2007. Conan (2007) is a single player, third-person perspective videogame. The game combines a range of traditional video game challenges with a focus on particularly brutal game-play featuring decapitations and dismemberment. The game also features the voice-acting of Ron Perlman as Conan.

=== Age of Conan: Unchained ===
Age of Conan: Unchained is an MMORPG created by Funcom. In addition to typical MMO gameplay, it features PvP siege gameplay where players build and attack each other's cities.

=== Conan: Tower of the Elephant ===
Conan: Tower of the Elephant is a game made for the iOS by Chillingo Ltd.

=== Conan Exiles ===
Conan Exiles is an open-world survival game made for the PC, PS4 and Xbox One made by Funcom. The playable character is a player created character who is rescued by Conan.

=== Conan Unconquered ===
Conan Unconquered is a real-time survival strategy game set in the barbaric world of Conan the Barbarian where you must build your stronghold and assemble an unconquerable army to survive the savage hordes of Hyboria. Conan Unconquered was released on 29 May 2019.

=== Conan Chop Chop ===
Conan Chop Chop is an action-adventure rogue-like game, released on March 1, 2022.
