= Belit (disambiguation) =

Bêlit is a character from the world of Conan the Barbarian

Belit may also refer to:

- Bel (mythology) or Belit, a title for various gods in Babylonian religion

== See also ==
- Belet-Seri, an underworld goddess in Babylonian religion
- Belit Ilani, a mistress of the gods in Babylonian religion
