= Conan: Adventures in an Age Undreamed Of =

2017 Tabletop role-playing game

- Cover illustration by Gerald Brom
- Designers: Chris Birch
- Publishers: Modiphius Entertainment
- Publication: PDF: January 31, 2017; Physical book: June 2017
- Genres: Sword and sorcery
- Systems: 2d20 System

Robert E. Howard's Conan: Adventures in an Age Undreamed Of is a sword and sorcery pen-and-paper role-playing game set in the world of Conan the Barbarian, the fictional Hyborian Age. Both the character and the setting were first imagined by author Robert E. Howard. Howard's original literary work has since spawned a vast franchise of novels, comic books, films, video games, board games, role-playing games, etc. Following this tradition, Conan: Adventures in an Age Undreamed Of is the third officially licensed Conan role-playing game. The two precedent games were Conan Role-Playing Game (1985–1988) and Conan: The Roleplaying Game (2004–2010), although there also had been supplements for independent generic systems, like GURPS Conan (1988–1989).

Conan: Adventures in an Age Undreamed Of was developed by a team of game designers, writers and artists, all led by Chris Birch of Modiphius Entertainment. The rights to publish this derivative work were licensed from Conan Properties International. Modiphius discontinued support for the game at the end of 2022.

== Development ==
In February 2015, British game company Modiphius announced that it would be releasing Robert E. Howard's Conan: Adventures in an Age Undreamed Of for launch August of the same year. Actually, the core rulebook was not launched until a whole year later, via Kickstarter, on 16 February 2016. A free Quickstart Guide was made available for download, which came with a short adventure. The Kickstarter was fully funded within hours of launch and in March 2016 its planned duration expired with a huge success (£45,000 required / £436,755 reached). Despite that the Kickstarter ended successfully in Summer 2016, the core rulebook was still being the subject of printing tests in January 2017. The Kickstarter raised almost ten times the goal amount.

== Publication ==
In January 2017, Modiphius Entertainment released Robert E. Howard's Conan: Adventures in an Age Undreamed Of in PDF form through DriveThruRPG. The first adventure supplement, Conan: Jeweled Thrones of the Earth, was also released in PDF form via DriveThruRPG on the same day as the PDF core rulebook.

In hardcover physical format, the core rulebook and the supplements Player's Guide and Jeweled Thrones of the Earth were all three printed in May 2017 and started distribution as of June 2017.

The line expanded to 20 titles before being discontinued at the end of 2022. The license to produce Conan roleplaying games passed to Monolith Games, which had previously produced a Conan board game.

== Core rulebook ==
The core rulebook for Conan: Adventures in an Age Undreamed Of, published in 2017, is a 368-page full colour hardcover book containing everything needed to adventure in the world of Robert E. Howard's hero, Conan. It is based entirely on the canonical Conan stories, and uses the 2d20 system developed by Modiphius, which was previously used in the role-playing games Mutant Chronicles 3rd Edition (2015), Corvus Belli's Infinity (2016), Star Trek Adventures (2017), and John Carter: Warlord of Mars (2018).

Jeffrey Shanks, award-winning Robert E. Howard scholar and essayist (Conan Meets the Academy and The Dark Man: The Journal of REH Studies) has been hard at work guiding the Modiphius team during initial development in 2015.

== List of published books ==
- Conan: Adventures in an Age Undreamed Of (June 2017), the core rulebook
- Player's Guide (June 2017), a player-focused version of the core rulebook
- Jeweled Thrones of the Earth (June 2017), a collection of seven standalone adventures
- Gamemaster's Toolkit, which includes the GM screen as well as a 32-page insert with random tables and rules references
- Conan the Barbarian, a sourcebook focusing on barbarian characters and adventures and featuring the Hyborian fictional lands of Asgard, Vanaheim, Hyperborea and Cimmeria
- Conan the Thief, a sourcebook focusing on thief characters and campaigns and featuring the Hyborian fictional lands of Nemedia, Brythunia, Corinthia and Zamora
- Conan the Mercenary, a sourcebook focusing on mercenary characters and adventures, including company-level mass combat rules and featuring the Hyborian fictional lands of Koth, Ophir and Shem
- The Book of Skelos, a magic sourcebook providing additional spells, rituals, alchemy, herbalism, astrology, enchantments, artifacts, etc.
- Forbidden Places & Pits of Horror, a set of 16 tiles (8 large and 8 medium) representing forbidden temples, monster-haunted spaces and other dangerous exotic locales
- Perilous Ruins & Forgotten Cities, a set of 16 tiles (8 large and 8 medium) representing lost places and ruins
- Dens of Iniquity & Streets of Terror, a set of 16 tiles (8 large and 8 medium) representing streets and building interiors
- Fields of Glory & Thrilling Encounters, a set of 16 tiles (8 large and 8 medium) representing dungeons and battlefields
- Blessing of Mitra, double-sided posters, maps and art, one of which includes a Hyborian map vs Gerald Brom cover art (all posters folded to US letter size)
- Conan the Pirate, a sourcebook focusing on pirate characters and adventures, including rules for ship combat and featuring the Hyborian fictional lands of Argos, Zingara, the Pictish coast, the Barachan Isles, the Vilayet Sea and the southwestern coast
- The Monolith Sourcebook, an adventure sourcebook crossing over with Monolith's upcoming Conan board game with extra board game scenarios, bonus content for the role-playing game plus a full adventure
- Horrors of the Hyborian Age, a bestiary covering monsters, undead, demons and other horrors
- Conan the Brigand, a sourcebook focusing on brigand characters and adventures and featuring the Hyborian fictional lands of Khoraja, Khauran and Turan
- Nameless Cults, a sourcebook describing the cults, gods, rituals and divine magic of the Hyborian Age
- Ancient Ruins & Cursed Cities, a sourcebook covering ruins, lost cities and other forgotten places
- Conan the Wanderer, a sourcebook focusing on adventuring in the Hyborian fictional lands of Iranistan, Ghulistan, Kosala, Vendhya, and Khitai
- Conan the Adventurer, a sourcebook focusing on adventures in the Hyborian fictional lands of Stygia, Kush, Keshan, Darfar, Punt, Zembabwei and the Black Kingdoms
- Conan the Scout, a sourcebook focusing on scout-based characters and adventures and featuring the Hyborian fictional lands of Gunderland, the Westermarck, the Bossonian Marches and the Border Kingdom
- Conan the King, a sourcebook focusing on noble characters and adventures, including king-level mass combat rules and featuring the Hyborian fictional lands of Aquilonia, Poitain, Nemedia and Koth
- Kull of Atlantis, a sourcebook detailing the Thurian Age of King Kull, with character options, a gazetteer, a roster of famous characters and creatures, and more on this pre-Cataclysmic age.
- The Exiles Sourcebook, a sourcebook focusing on the video game of the same name.
- The Age of Conan, a sourcebook focusing on the video game of the same name.
- Waves Stained Crimson Campaign, a campaign sourcebook.

== See also ==
- Conan Unchained!
- Conan Against Darkness!
- Conan Role-Playing Game
- Conan: The Roleplaying Game
- GURPS Conan
