= Red Sonja Unconquered =

Dungeons & Dragons adventure module

- Code: RS1
- TSR product code: 9183
- Rules required: Dungeons & Dragons
- Character levels: 10–14
- Campaign setting: CM
- Authors: Anne Gray McCready
- First published: 1986

Linked modules
- RS1

Red Sonja Unconquered (ISBN 0-88038-324-0) is a 1986 adventure module for the Dungeons & Dragons roleplaying game based on the barbarian heroine, Red Sonja. Its module code is RS1 and its TSR product code is TSR 9183. Like the similar barbarian-hero inspired Conan modules (CB1 and CB2), this module was not very popular.

== Plot summary ==
Red Sonja Unconquered is an adventure scenario intended for high-level player characters, featuring Red Sonja.

== Publication history ==
RS1 Red Sonja Unconquered was written by Anne G. McCready, with art by Clyde Caldwell, and was published by TSR in 1986 as a 32-page booklet with a large color map, and an outer folder.

=== Credits ===
- Anne Gray McCready: Author
- Tim Kilpin: Editing
- Clyde Caldwell: Cover & interior art
- Dennis Kauth: Cartography
- Betty Elmore: Typography

== Reception ==
Lawrence Schick, in his 1991 book Heroic Worlds, says that Sonja gets "to an ancient burial ground, where she finds a whole lot of trouble".

== See also ==
- List of Dungeons & Dragons modules
