= Conan the Barbarian =

Fictional character created by Robert E. Howard

- Illustration of Conan by Mark Schultz
- First appearance: Weird Tales (December 1932)
- Created by: Robert E. Howard
- Portrayed by: Arnold Schwarzenegger (1982 and 1984 films); Jorge Sanz (1982 film, Young); Ralf Möller (Television series); Jason Momoa (2011 film); Leo Howard (2011 film, Young)
- Voiced by: Michael Donovan (Conan the Adventurer); Phil Hayes (Conan and the Young Warriors); Ron Perlman (2007 video game); Matthew Waterson (Conan Exiles); Chris Cox (Mortal Kombat 1)

In-universe information
- Species: Human
- Gender: Male
- Occupation: Current: King; Former: Adventurer; Pirate; Warrior; Slave; Gladiator; Thief
- Origin: Cimmeria, Hyboria
- Nationality: Cimmerian

Conan the Barbarian (also known as Conan the Cimmerian) is a fictional sword and sorcery hero created by American author Robert E. Howard (1906–1936). He debuted in 1932 and went on to appear in a series of fantasy stories published in Weird Tales magazine. After first appearing in pulp magazines, the character has since been adapted to books, comics, films (including Conan the Barbarian and Conan the Destroyer), television programmes (animated and live action), video games, and role-playing games.

The earliest appearance of a Robert E. Howard character named Conan was that of a black-haired barbarian with heroic attributes in the 1931 short story "People of the Dark". Howard wrote 21 stories featuring Conan in his lifetime. Many other writers have since written additional Conan stories over the years.

Many Conan the Barbarian stories feature Conan embarking on heroic adventures filled with common fantasy elements such as princesses and wizards. Howard's mythopoeia has the stories set in the legendary Hyborian Age, set between the destruction of Atlantis and the beginning of recorded history. Conan is a Cimmerian, who are descendants of the Atlanteans and ancestors of the modern Gaels. Conan is himself a descendant of Kull of Atlantis (an earlier adventurer of Howard's). He was born on a battlefield and raised by his father, a blacksmith.

Conan is characterized as chivalric due to his penchant to save damsels in distress and fight for causes that do not directly benefit him. He possesses great strength, combativeness, intelligence, agility, and endurance. The barbarian's appearance is iconic, with square-cut black hair, blue eyes, tanned skin, and giant stature.

Conan books increased in popularity thanks to covers painted by Frank Frazetta, which cemented the current popular appearance of Conan. Comics published in the 1970s by Marvel Comics drew further popularity to the character, introducing the now iconic image of Conan in his loincloth. The most popular cinematic adaptation is the 1982 film Conan the Barbarian directed by John Milius and starring Arnold Schwarzenegger as Conan.

== Publication history ==
Robert E. Howard created Conan the Barbarian in a series of fantasy stories published in Weird Tales from 1932. Howard was searching for a new character to market to the burgeoning pulp outlets of the early 1930s. In October 1931, he submitted the short story "People of the Dark" to Clayton Publications' new magazine, Strange Tales of Mystery and Terror (June 1932). "People of the Dark" is a story about the remembrance of "past lives", and in its first-person narrative, the protagonist describes one of his previous incarnations: Conan is a black-haired barbarian hero who swears by a deity called Crom. Some Howard scholars believe this Conan to be a forerunner of the more famous character.

In February 1932, Howard vacationed at a border town on the lower Rio Grande. During this trip, he further conceived the character of Conan and also wrote the poem "Cimmeria", much of which echoes specific passages in Plutarch's Lives. According to some scholars, reading Thomas Bulfinch inspired Howard to "coalesce into a coherent whole his literary aspirations and the strong physical, autobiographical elements underlying the creation of Conan".

Having digested these influences upon returning from his trip, Howard rewrote a rejected story, "By This Axe I Rule!" (May 1929), replacing his existing character Kull of Atlantis with his new hero and re-titling it "The Phoenix on the Sword". Howard also wrote "The Scarlet Citadel" and "The Frost-Giant's Daughter", inspired by the Greek myth of Daphne, and submitted both stories to Weird Tales magazine. Although "The Frost-Giant's Daughter" was rejected, the magazine accepted "The Phoenix on the Sword" after it received the requested polishing, and published it in the December 1932 issue. "The Scarlet Citadel" was published the following month.

"The Phoenix on the Sword" appeared in Weird Tales cover-dated December 1932. Editor Farnsworth Wright subsequently prompted Howard to write an 8,000-word essay for personal use detailing "the Hyborian Age", the fictional setting for Conan. Using this essay as his guideline, Howard began plotting "The Tower of the Elephant", a new Conan story that was the first to integrate his new conception of the Hyborian world.

The publication and success of "The Tower of the Elephant" spurred Howard to write more Conan stories for Weird Tales. By the time of Howard's suicide in 1936, he had written 21 complete stories, 17 of which had been published, as well as multiple unfinished fragments.

Following Howard's death, the copyright of the Conan stories passed through several hands. Eventually L. Sprague de Camp was entrusted with management of the fiction line and, beginning with 1967's Conan released by Lancer Books, oversaw a paperback series collecting all of Howard's stories (Lancer folded in 1973 and Ace Books picked up the line, reprinting the older volumes with new trade dress and continuing to release new ones). Howard's original stories received additional edits by de Camp, and de Camp also decided to create additional Conan stories to publish alongside the originals, working with Björn Nyberg and especially Lin Carter. These new stories were created from a mixture of already-complete Howard stories with different settings and characters that were altered to feature Conan and the Hyborian setting instead, incomplete fragments and outlines for Conan stories that were never completed by Howard, and all-new pastiches. Lastly, de Camp created prefaces for each story, fitting them into a timeline of Conan's life that he created.

For roughly 40 years, the original versions of Howard's Conan stories remained out of print. In 1977, the publisher Berkley Books issued three volumes using the earliest published form of the texts from Weird Tales and thus no de Camp edits, with Karl Edward Wagner as series editor, but these were halted by action from de Camp before the remaining three intended volumes could be released. In the 1980s and 1990s, the copyright holders permitted Howard's stories to go out of print entirely as the public demand for sword & sorcery dwindled, but continued to release the occasional new Conan novel by other authors such as Leonard Carpenter, Roland Green, and Harry Turtledove.

In 2000, the British publisher Gollancz Science Fiction issued a two-volume, complete edition of Howard's Conan stories as part of its Fantasy Masterworks imprint, which included several stories that had never seen print in their original form. The Gollancz edition mostly used the versions of the stories as published in Weird Tales.

The two volumes were combined and the stories restored to chronological order as The Complete Chronicles of Conan: Centenary Edition (Gollancz Science Fiction, 2006; edited and with an Afterword by Steve Jones).

In 2003, another British publisher, Wandering Star Books, made an effort both to restore Howard's original manuscripts and to provide a more scholarly and historical view of the Conan stories. It published hardcover editions in England, which were republished in the United States by the Del Rey imprint of Ballantine Books. The first book, Conan of Cimmeria: Volume One (1932–1933) (2003; published in the US as The Coming of Conan the Cimmerian) includes Howard's notes on his fictional setting as well as letters and poems concerning the genesis of his ideas. This was followed by Conan of Cimmeria: Volume Two (1934) (2004; published in the US as The Bloody Crown of Conan) and Conan of Cimmeria: Volume Three (1935–1936) (2005; published in the US as The Conquering Sword of Conan). These three volumes include all the original Conan stories.

== Setting ==
The stories occur in the fictional "Hyborian Age", set after the destruction of Atlantis and before the rise of any historical ancient civilization. This is a specific epoch in a fictional timeline created by Howard for many of the low fantasy tales of his artificial legendary.

Howard invented the Hyborian Age as a useful literary device. He had an intense love for history and historical dramas, but he also recognized the difficulties and the time-consuming research work needed in maintaining historical accuracy. Also, the poorly-stocked libraries in the rural part of Texas where Howard lived did not have the material needed for such research. By conceiving a fictional "vanished age" and choosing names that resembled historical ones, Howard avoided anachronisms and the need for lengthy exposition.

According to "The Phoenix on the Sword", the adventures of Conan take place "Between the years when the oceans drank Atlantis and the gleaming cities, and the years of the rise of the Sons of Aryas."

== Personality and character ==
Hither came Conan, the Cimmerian, black-haired, sullen-eyed, sword in hand, a thief, a reaver, a slayer, with gigantic melancholies and gigantic mirth, to tread the jeweled thrones of the Earth under his sandalled feet."

— Robert E. Howard, The Phoenix on the Sword, 1932

Conan is a Cimmerian. The writings of Robert E. Howard (particularly his essay "The Hyborian Age") suggest that his Cimmerians are based on the Celts or perhaps the historic Cimmerians. Conan was born on a battlefield and is the son of a village blacksmith. Conan matured quickly as a youth and, by age fifteen, he was already a respected warrior who had participated in the destruction of the Aquilonian fortress of Venarium. After its demise, he was struck by wanderlust and began the adventures chronicled by Howard, encountering skulking monsters, evil wizards, tavern wenches, and beautiful princesses. He roamed throughout the Hyborian Age nations as a thief, outlaw, mercenary, and pirate. As he grew older, he began commanding vast units of warriors and escalating his ambitions. In his forties, he seized the crown from the tyrannical king of Aquilonia, the most powerful kingdom of the Hyborian Age, having strangled the previous ruler on the steps of his own throne. Conan's adventures often result in him performing heroic feats, though his motivation for doing so is largely to protect his own survival or for personal gain.

A conspicuous element of Conan's character is his chivalry. He is extremely reluctant to fight women (even when they fight him) and has a strong tendency to save a damsel in distress. In "Jewels of Gwahlur", he has to make a split-second decision whether to save the dancing girl Muriela or the chest of priceless gems which he spent months in search of. So, without hesitation, he rescues Muriela and allows for the treasure to be irrevocably lost. In "The Black Stranger", Conan saves the exile Zingaran Lady Belesa at considerable risk to himself, giving her as a parting gift his fortune in gems big enough to have a comfortable and wealthy life in Zingara, while asking for no favors in return. Reviewer Jennifer Bard also noted that when Conan is in a pirate crew or a robber gang led by another male, his tendency is to subvert and undermine the leader's authority, and eventually supplant (and often, kill) him (e.g. "Pool of the Black One", "A Witch Shall be Born", "Shadows in the Moonlight"). Conversely, in "Queen of the Black Coast", it is noted that Conan "generally agreed to Belit's plan. Hers was the mind that directed their raids, his the arm that carried out her ideas. It was a good life." And at the end of "Red Nails", Conan and Valeria seem to be headed towards a reasonably amicable piratical partnership.

=== Appearance ===
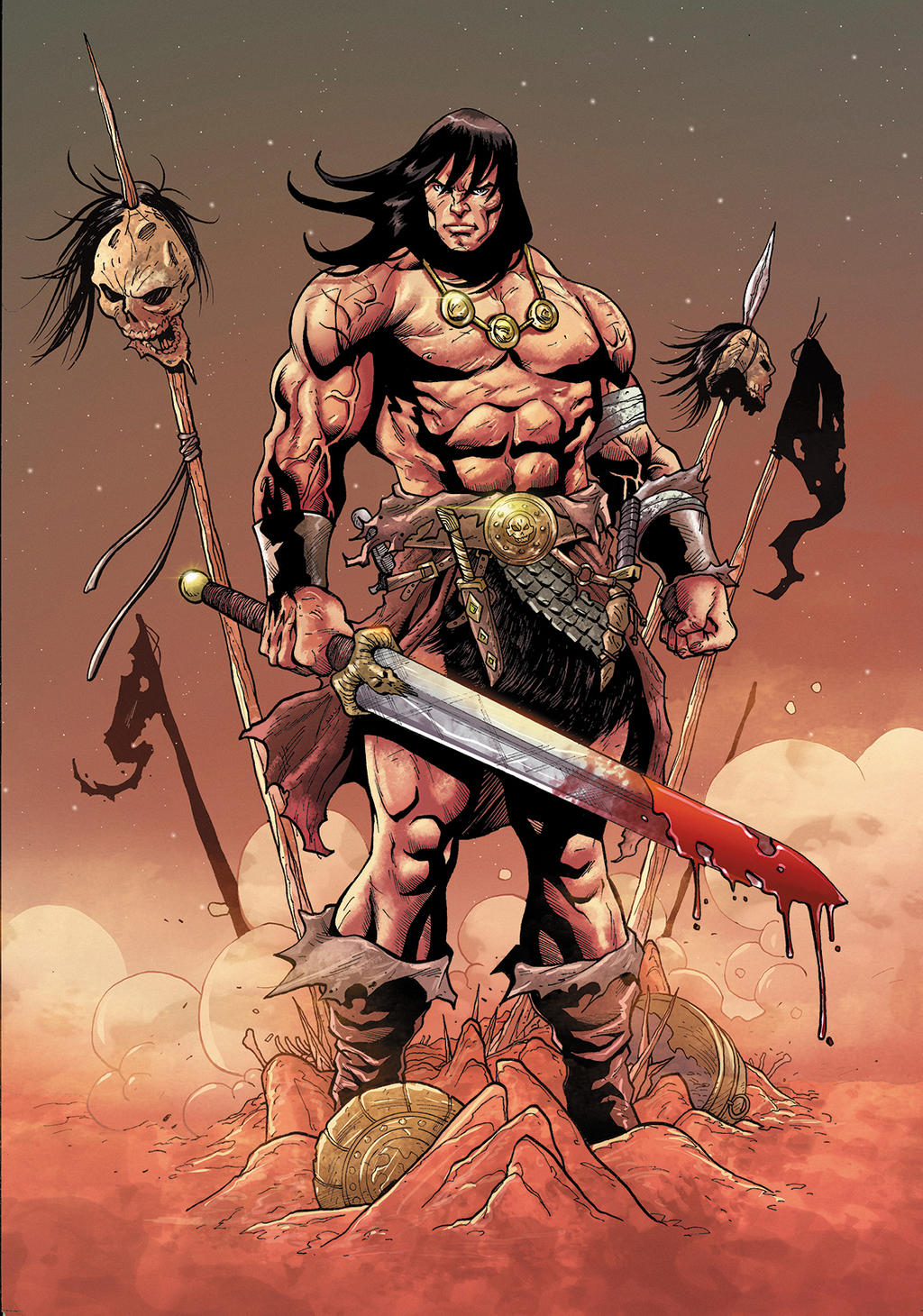
Fan art of Conan the Barbarian in his iconic loincloth

Conan has "sullen", "smoldering", and "volcanic" blue eyes with a black "square-cut mane". Howard once describes him as having a hairy chest and, while comic book interpretations often portray Conan as wearing a loincloth or other minimalist clothing to give him a more barbaric image, Howard describes the character as wearing whatever garb is typical for the kingdom and culture in which Conan finds himself. Howard never gave a strict height or weight for Conan in a story, only describing him in loose terms like "giant" and "massive".

According to a report by The Independent, Den Beauvais, a Canadian artist known for his illustrations in the role-playing game Dungeons & Dragons and at the well-known U.S. comic book publisher Dark Horse Comics claimed that Rob De La Torre's Conan was adapted from Turkish actor Yavuz Selekman. Torre did not make a direct statement regarding the allegation, but shared an image on his Facebook page showing a drawing of Conan the Barbarian alongside Selekman's face.

In an interview, longtime Conan artist Mahmud Asrar confirmed that "it is true that De La Torre's Conan drew inspiration from Selekman," but he also pointed that De La Torre's most significant influence was actually from old Conan illustrations of John Buscema.

In the tales, no human is ever described as being stronger than Conan, although a few are mentioned as taller (including the strangler, Baal-Pteor) or of larger bulk. In a letter to P. Schuyler Miller and John D. Clark in 1936, only three months before Howard's death, Conan is described as standing 6 feet (1.8 m) and weighing 180 pounds (82 kg) when he takes part in an attack on Venarium at only 15 years old, though being far from fully grown. At one point, when he is meeting Juma in Kush, he describes Conan as tall as his friend, at nearly 7 feet (2.1 m) in height.

Conan himself says in "Beyond the Black River" that he had "not yet seen 15 snows" at the Battle of Venarium: "At Vanarium he was already a formidable antagonist, though only fifteen, He stood six feet tall [1.83 m] and weighed 180 pounds [82 kg], though he lacked much of having his full growth." Although Conan is muscular, Howard frequently compares his agility and way of moving to that of a panther (see, for instance, "Jewels of Gwahlur", "Beyond the Black River", or "Rogues in the House"). His skin is frequently characterized as bronzed from constant exposure to the sun. In his younger years, he is often depicted wearing a light chain shirt and a horned helmet, though appearances vary with different stories.

During his reign as king of Aquilonia, Conan was

[...] a tall man, mightily shouldered and deep of chest, with a massive corded neck and heavily muscled limbs. He was clad in silk and velvet, with the royal lions of Aquilonia worked in gold upon his rich jupon, and the crown of Aquilonia shone on his square-cut black mane; but the great sword at his side seemed more natural to him than the regal accoutrements. His brow was low and broad, his eyes a volcanic blue that smoldered as if with some inner fire. His dark, scarred, almost sinister face was that of a fighting-man, and his velvet garments could not conceal the hard, dangerous lines of his limbs.

Howard imagined the Cimmerians as a pre-Celtic people with mostly black hair and blue or grey eyes. Ethnically, the Cimmerians to which Conan belongs are descendants of the Atlanteans, though they do not remember their ancestry. In his fictional historical essay "The Hyborian Age", Howard describes how the people of Atlantis—the land where his character King Kull originated—had to move east after a great cataclysm changed the face of the world and sank their island, settling where Ireland and Scotland would eventually be located. Thus they are (in Howard's work) the ancestors of the Irish and Scottish (the Celtic Gaels) and not the Picts, the other ancestor of modern Scots who also appear in Howard's work. In the same work, Howard also described how the Cimmerians eventually moved south and east after the age of Conan (presumably in the vicinity of the Black Sea, where the historical Cimmerians dwelt).

Conan's current popular appearance was as illustrated by Frank Frazetta for the covers of Lancer Paperbacks which began selling in the millions, largely credited to Frazetta's covers.

=== Abilities ===
Despite his brutish appearance, Conan uses his brains as well as his brawn. The Cimmerian is a highly skilled warrior, possibly without peer with a sword, but his travels have given him vast experience in other trades, especially as a thief. He's also a talented commander, tactician, and strategist, as well as a born leader. In addition, Conan has advanced knowledge of languages and codes and is able to recognize, or even decipher, certain ancient or secret signs and writings. For example, in "Jewels of Gwahlur" Howard states: "In his roaming about the world the giant adventurer had picked up a wide smattering of knowledge, particularly including the speaking and reading of many alien tongues. Many a sheltered scholar would have been astonished at the Cimmerian's linguistic abilities." He also has incredible stamina, enabling him to go without sleep for a few days. In "A Witch Shall be Born", Conan fights armed men until he is overwhelmed, captured, and crucified, before going an entire night and day without water. However, Conan still possesses the strength to pull the nails from his feet, while hoisting himself into a horse's saddle and riding for ten miles.

Another noticeable trait is his sense of humor, largely absent in the comics and movies, but very much a part of Howard's original vision of the character (particularly apparent in "Xuthal of the Dusk", also known as "The Slithering Shadow".) His sense of humor can also be rather grimly ironic, as was demonstrated by how he unleashes his own version of justice on the treacherous—and ill-fated—innkeeper Aram Baksh in "Shadows in Zamboula".

He is characterized as a loyal friend to those true to him, with a barbaric code of conduct that often marks him as more honorable than the more sophisticated people he meets in his travels. His straightforward nature and barbarism are constants in all the tales.

Conan is a formidable combatant both armed and unarmed. With his back to the wall, Conan is capable of engaging and killing opponents by the score. This is seen in several stories, such as "Queen of the Black Coast", "The Scarlet Citadel", and "A Witch Shall Be Born". Conan is not superhuman, though; he needed the providential help of Zelata's wolf to defeat four Nemedian soldiers in Howard's novel The Hour of the Dragon. Some of his hardest victories have come from fighting single opponents of inhuman strength: one such as Thak, an ape-like humanoid from "Rogues in the House", or the strangler Baal-Pteor in "Shadows in Zamboula". Conan is far from untouchable and has been captured or defeated several times (on one occasion, knocking himself out after drunkenly running into a wall).

=== Influences ===
Howard frequently corresponded with H. P. Lovecraft, and the two would sometimes insert references or elements of each other's settings in their works. Later editors reworked many of the original Conan stories by Howard, thus diluting this connection. Nevertheless, many of Howard's unedited Conan stories are arguably part of the Cthulhu Mythos. Additionally, many of the Conan stories by Howard, de Camp, and Carter used geographical place names from Clark Ashton Smith's Hyperborean Cycle.

== Original Robert E. Howard Conan stories ==
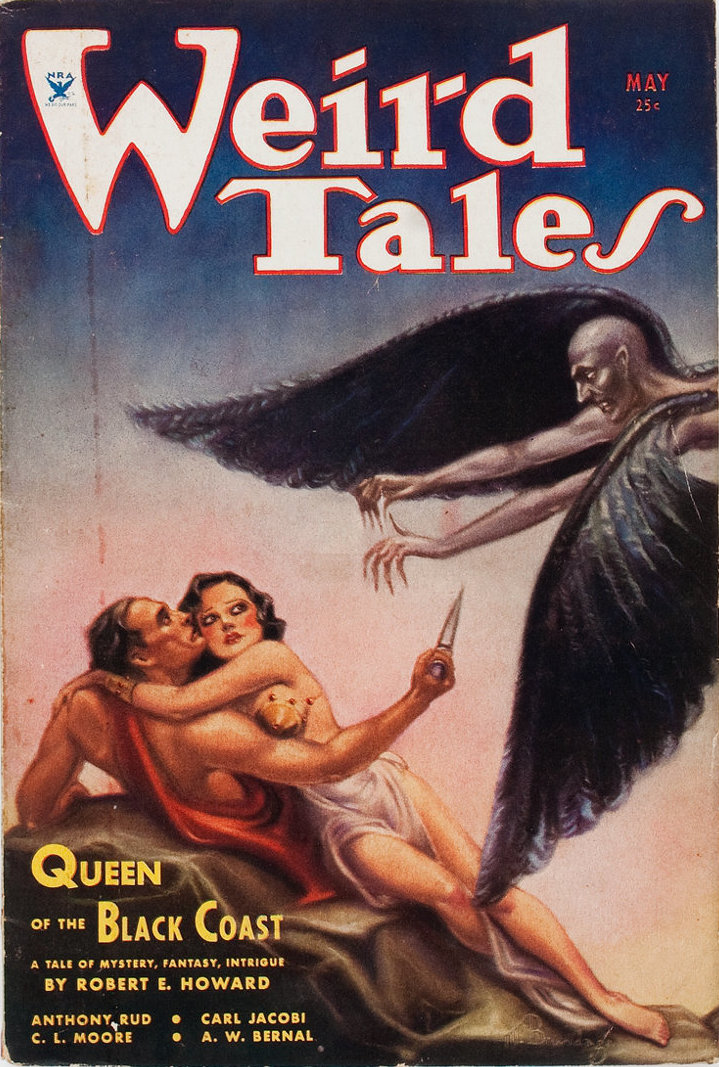
Cover of Weird Tales (May 1934) depicting Conan and Bêlit in "Queen of the Black Coast", one of Robert E. Howard's original Conan stories

=== Conan stories published in Weird Tales ===
1. "The Phoenix on the Sword" (novelette; vol. 20, #6, December 1932)
2. "The Scarlet Citadel" (novelette; vol. 21, #1, January 1, 1933)
3. "The Tower of the Elephant" (novelette; vol. 21, #3, March 1933)
4. "Black Colossus" (novelette; vol. 21, #6, June 1933)
5. "The Slithering Shadow" (novelette; vol. 22, #3, September 1933, alternate title "Xuthal of the Dusk")
6. "The Pool of the Black One" (novelette; vol. 22, #4, October 1933)
7. "Rogues in the House" (novelette; vol. 23, #1, January 1934)
8. "Iron Shadows in the Moon" (novelette; vol. 23, #4, April 1934, published as "Shadows in the Moonlight")
9. "Queen of the Black Coast" (novelette; vol. 23, #5, May 1934)
10. "The Devil in Iron" (novelette; vol. 24, #2, August 1934)
11. "The People of the Black Circle" (novella; vol. 24, #3–5, September–November 1934)
12. "A Witch Shall Be Born" (novelette; vol. 24, #6, December 1934)
13. "Jewels of Gwahlur" (novelette; vol. 25, #3, March 1935, author's original title "The Servants of Bit-Yakin")
14. "Beyond the Black River" (novella; vol. 25, #5–6, May–June 1935)
15. "Shadows in Zamboula" (novelette; vol. 26, #5, November 1935, author's original title "The Man-Eaters of Zamboula")
16. "The Hour of the Dragon" (novel; vol. 26, #6 & vol. 27, #1–4, December 1935, January–April 1936)
17. "Red Nails" (novella; vol. 28, #1–3, July, September, October 1936)

=== Conan stories published in Fantasy Fan magazine ===
- "Gods of the North" (March 1934) – published as The Frost-Giant's Daughter in The Coming of Conan, 1953

=== Conan stories not published in Howard's lifetime ===
- "The God in the Bowl" – Published in Space Science Fiction, Sep. 1952
- "The Black Stranger" – Published in Fantasy Magazine, Feb. 1953
- "The Vale of Lost Women" – Published in The Magazine of Horror, Spring 1967

=== Unfinished Conan stories by Howard ===
- "The Drums of Tombalku" – Fragment. Published in Conan the Adventurer, 1966
- "The Hall of the Dead" – Synopsis. Published in The Magazine of Fantasy and Science Fiction, February 1967
- "The Hand of Nergal" – Fragment. Published in Conan, 1967
- "The Snout in the Dark" – Fragment. Published in Conan of Cimmeria, 1969

A number of untitled synopses for Conan stories also exist.

=== Other Conan-related material by Howard ===
- "Wolves Beyond the Border" – A non-Conan story set in Conan's world. Fragment. Published in 1967 in Conan the Usurper
- "The Hyborian Age" – An essay written in 1932. Published in 1938 in The Hyborian Age
- "Cimmeria" – A poem written in 1932. Published in 1965 in The Howard Collector

== Book editions ==
The character of Conan has proven durably popular, resulting in Conan stories by later writers such as Poul Anderson, Leonard Carpenter, Lin Carter, L. Sprague de Camp, Roland J. Green, John C. Hocking, Robert Jordan, Sean A. Moore, Björn Nyberg, Andrew J. Offutt, Steve Perry, John Maddox Roberts, Harry Turtledove, and Karl Edward Wagner. Some of these writers have finished incomplete Conan manuscripts by Howard. Others were created by rewriting Howard stories which originally featured entirely different characters from entirely different milieus. Most, however, are completely original works. In total, more than fifty novels and dozens of short stories featuring the Conan character have been written by authors other than Howard.

The Gnome Press edition (1950–1957) was the first hardcover collection of Howard's Conan stories, including all the original Howard material known to exist at the time, some left unpublished in his lifetime. The later volumes contain some stories rewritten by L. Sprague de Camp (like "The Treasure of Tranicos"), including several non-Conan Howard stories, mostly historical exotica situated in the Levant at the time of the Crusades, which he turned into Conan yarns. The Gnome edition also issued the first Conan story written by an author other than Howard—the final volume published, which is by Björn Nyberg and revised by de Camp.

The Lancer/Ace editions (1966–1977), under the direction of de Camp and Lin Carter collected the material published in the Gnome Press series together in an order based on Conan's fictional biography (as de Camp and Carter saw it) together with writing by Howard left unpublished in his lifetime, as well as fragments and outlines. The latter were completed by de Camp and Carter. The series also included Howard stories originally featuring other protagonists that were rewritten by de Camp into Conan stories. New Conan stories written by de Camp and Carter were added. Lancer Books went out of business before bringing out the entire series. The series was completed by Ace Books. Eight of the eventual twelve volumes published featured dynamic cover paintings by Frank Frazetta that, for many fans, presented the definitive, iconic impression of Conan and his world. For decades to come, most other portrayals of the Cimmerian and his imitators were based on Frazetta's cover paintings of this series.

Most editions after the Lancer/Ace series have been of either the original Howard stories or Conan material by others, but not both. The exception are the Ace Maroto editions (1978–1981), which include both new material by other authors and older material by Howard, though the latter are some of the non-Conan tales by Howard rewritten as Conan stories by de Camp. Notable later editions of the original Howard Conan stories include the Donald M. Grant editions (1974–1989, incomplete); Berkley editions (1977); Gollancz editions (2000–2006), and Wandering Star/Del Rey editions (2003–2005). Later series of new Conan material include the Bantam editions (1978–1982) and Tor editions (1982–2004).

== Conan chronologies ==
In an attempt to provide a coherent timeline which fit the numerous adventures of Conan penned by Robert E. Howard and later writers, various "Conan chronologies" have been prepared by many people from the 1930s onward. Note that no consistent timeline has yet accommodated every single Conan story. The following are the principal theories that have been advanced over the years.

- Miller/Clark chronology – A Probable Outline of Conan's Career (1936) was the first effort to put the tales in chronological order. Completed by P. Schuyler Miller and John Drury Clark, the chronology was later revised by Clark and L. Sprague de Camp in An Informal Biography of Conan the Cimmerian (1952).
- Robert Jordan chronology – A Conan Chronology by Robert Jordan (1987) was a new chronology written by Conan writer Robert Jordan that included all written Conan material up to that point. It was heavily influenced by the Miller/Clark/de Camp chronologies, though it departed from them in a number of idiosyncratic instances.
- William Galen Gray chronology – Timeline of Conan's Journeys (1997, rev. 2004), was fan William Galen Gray's attempt to create "a chronology of all the stories, both Howard and pastiche." Drawing on the earlier Miller/Clark and Jordan chronologies, it represents the ultimate expression of their tradition to date.
- Joe Marek chronology – Joe Marek's chronology is limited to stories written (or devised) by Howard, though within that context it is essentially a revision of the Miller/Clark tradition to better reflect the internal evidence of the stories and avoid forcing Conan into what he perceives as a "mad dash" around the Hyborian world within timeframes too rapid to be credible.
- Dale Rippke chronology – The Darkstorm Conan Chronology (2003) was a completely revised and heavily researched chronology, radically repositioning a number of stories and including only those stories written or devised by Howard. The Dark Horse comic series follows this chronology.

== Media ==
=== Films ===
==== Schwarzenegger as Conan (1980s) ====
The first Conan cinematic project was planned by Edward Summer. Summer envisioned a series of Conan films, much like the James Bond franchise. He outlined six stories for this film series, but none was ever made. An original screenplay by Summer and Roy Thomas was written, but their lore-authentic screen story was never filmed. However, the resulting film, Conan the Barbarian (1982), was a combination of director John Milius's ideas and plots from Conan stories (written also by Howard's successors, notably Lin Carter and L. Sprague de Camp). A Nietzschean motto and Conan's life philosophy were notably added in this adaptation.

The plot of Conan the Barbarian (1982) begins with Conan being enslaved by the Vanir raiders of Thulsa Doom, a malevolent warlord who is responsible for the slaying of Conan's parents and the genocide of his people. Later, Thulsa Doom becomes a cult leader of a religion that worships Set, a Snake God. The vengeful Conan, the archer Subotai and the thief Valeria set out on a quest to rescue a princess held captive by Thulsa Doom. The film was directed by John Milius and produced by Dino De Laurentiis. The character of Conan was played by Jorge Sanz as a child and Arnold Schwarzenegger as an adult. It was Schwarzenegger's break-through role as an actor.

This film was followed by a less popular sequel, Conan the Destroyer in 1984. This sequel was a more typical fantasy-genre film and was even less faithful to Howard's Conan stories, being just a picaresque story of an assorted bunch of adventurers.

A third film was planned for 1987 to be titled Conan the Conqueror. The director was to be either Guy Hamilton or John Guillermin. Since Arnold Schwarzenegger was committed to the film Predator and De Laurentiis's contract with the star had expired after his obligation to Red Sonja and Raw Deal, he was not keen to negotiate a new one; thus the third Conan film sank into development hell. The script was eventually turned into Kull the Conqueror. In March 2026, during the Arnold Sports Festival, Schwarzenegger revealed that King Conan, a sequel to Conan the Destroyer, was in development at 20th Century Studios, with Christopher McQuarrie set to write and direct.

==== Momoa as Conan (2011) ====
There were rumors in the late 1990s of another Conan sequel, a story about an older Conan titled King Conan: Crown of Iron, but Schwarzenegger's election in 2003 as governor of California ended this project. Warner Bros. spent seven years trying to get the project off the ground. However, in June 2007 the rights reverted to Paradox Entertainment, though all drafts made under Warner remained with them. In August 2007, it was announced that Millennium Films had acquired the rights to the project. Production was aimed for a Spring 2006 start, with the intention of having stories more faithful to the Robert E. Howard creation. In June 2009, Millennium hired Marcus Nispel to direct. In January 2010, Jason Momoa was selected for the role of Conan. The film was released in August 2011, and met poor critical reviews and box office results.

==== Unproduced: Legend of Conan ====
In 2012, producers Chris Morgan and Frederick Malmberg announced plans for a sequel to the 1982 Conan the Barbarian titled The Legend of Conan, with Arnold Schwarzenegger reprising his role as Conan. A year later, Deadline reported that Andrea Berloff would write the script. Years passed since the initial announcement as Schwarzenegger worked on other films, but as late as 2016, Schwarzenegger affirmed his enthusiasm for making the film, saying, "Interest is high ... but we are not rushing." The script was finished, and Schwarzenegger and Morgan were meeting with possible directors. In April 2017, producer Chris Morgan stated that Universal had dropped the project, although there was a possibility of a TV show. The story of the film was supposed to be set 30 years after the first, with some inspiration from Clint Eastwood's Unforgiven.

==== She Is Conann ====
In 2023, French film director Bertrand Mandico released She Is Conann, a gender-flipped version of Conan the Barbarian which stars five different actresses playing a female Conann at different stages in her life.

==== King Conan ====
In 2026 it was announced Schwarzenneger would return playing an aged Conan in King Conan. The movie had Christopher Maquarie as writer and director, and filming was announced as to begin in late 2026. In this story Conan has been king for 40 years, but is forced off his throne and has to win back his kingdom.

=== Live action stage show ===
A play loosely based on the "Conan the Barbarian" movie from 1982 was an attraction at Universal Studios California. The attraction ran for 10 years from 1983 to 1993 and the play's full title was "The Adventures of Conan: A Sword and Sorcery Spectacular". The live shows featured Richard Brose portraying Conan and Robyn Blythe portraying Red Sonja.

=== Television ===
There have been four television series related to Conan:

- Conan the Adventurer is an animated television series produced by Jetlag Productions and Sunbow Productions that debuted on September 13, 1992, ran for 65 episodes and concluded on November 23, 1993. The series involved Conan chasing Serpent Men across the world in an attempt to release his parents from eternal imprisonment as living statues.
- Conan and the Young Warriors is an animated television series that premiered in 1994 and ran for 13 episodes. Sunbow Productions produced the show and CBS aired this series as a spin-off to the previous animated series. This cartoon took place after the finale of Conan the Adventurer with Wrath-Amon vanquished and Conan's family returned to life from living stone. Conan soon finds that the family of one of his friends are being turned into wolves by an evil sorceress and he must train three warriors in order to aid him in rescuing them.
- Conan the Adventurer is a live-action television series that premiered on September 22, 1997, and ran for 22 episodes. It starred German bodybuilder Ralf Möller as Conan, Danny Woodburn (Otli), Robert McRay (Zzeben), and TJ Storm (Bayu) as his sidekicks. The storyline was quite different from the Conan lore of Howard. In this adaptation, Conan is a pleasant and jovial person. Also in this version, Conan is not a loner but one member of a merry band of adventurers.
- In September 2020, it was announced that Netflix will develop a new Conan TV series as a part of a larger deal involving Fredrik Malmberg and Mark Wheeler from Pathfinder Media between Netflix and Conan Properties International, owned by Cabinet Entertainment, for the exclusive rights to the Conan library for the rights for live-action and animated films and TV shows. Deadline had previously reported that a Conan show was in the works at Amazon Prime, but nothing came of it. According to Robert Rodriguez while as a guest on Joe Rogan Experience, he pitched a Conan trilogy film with James Cameron involved but revealed that Netflix has lost the rights to make a series.
- In June 2026 at the Annecy film festival, it was announced Genndy Tartakovsky would be creating and executive producing an animated series based off Conan. The series is being produced in collaboration with Cartoon Network Studios and will air on Prime Video.

=== Comics ===
Comic adaptations of Conan are arguably, apart from the books, the vehicle that had the greatest influence on the longevity and popularity of the character. The earliest comic book adaptation of Conan was written in Spanish and first published in Mexico in the fifties. This version, which was done without authorization from the estate of Robert E. Howard, is loosely based on the short story Queen of the Black Coast. The first licensed comic adaptations were written in English and first published by Marvel Comics in the seventies, beginning with Conan the Barbarian (1970–1993) and the classic Savage Sword of Conan (1974–1995). Dark Horse Comics launched their Conan series in 2003. Dark Horse Comics published compilations of the 1970s Marvel Comics series in trade paperback format.

Barack Obama, former President of the United States, is a fan of the character and collects Conan the Barbarian comic books. Obama also appeared as a character in a comic book called Barack the Barbarian from Devil's Due.

Marvel Comics introduced a relatively lore-faithful version of Conan the Barbarian in 1970 with Conan the Barbarian, written by Roy Thomas and illustrated by Barry Windsor-Smith. Smith was succeeded by penciller John Buscema, while Thomas continued to write for many years. Later writers included J. M. DeMatteis, Bruce Jones, Michael Fleisher, Doug Moench, Jim Owsley, Alan Zelenetz, Chuck Dixon and Don Kraar. In 1974, Conan the Barbarian series spawned the more adult-oriented, black-and-white comics magazine Savage Sword of Conan, written by Thomas with art mostly by Buscema or Alfredo Alcala. Marvel also published several graphic novels starring the character, and a handbook with detailed information about the Hyborian world. Conan the Barbarian is also officially considered to be part of the larger Marvel Universe and has interacted with heroes and villains alike.

The Marvel Conan stories were also adapted as a newspaper comic strip which appeared daily and Sunday from 4 September 1978 to 12 April 1981. Originally written by Roy Thomas and illustrated by John Buscema, the strip was continued by several different Marvel artists and writers.

Dark Horse Comics began their comic adaptation of the Conan saga in 2003. Entitled simply Conan, the series was first written by Kurt Busiek and pencilled by Cary Nord. Tim Truman replaced Busiek, when Busiek signed an exclusive contract with DC Comics. However, Busiek issues were sometimes used for filler. This series is an interpretation of the original Conan material by Robert E. Howard with no connection whatsoever to the earlier Marvel comics or any Conan story not written or envisioned by Howard supplemented by wholly original material.

A second series, Conan the Cimmerian was released in 2008 by Tim Truman (writer) and Tomás Giorello (artist). The series ran for twenty-six issues, including an introductory "zero" issue.

Dark Horse's third series, Conan: Road of Kings, began in December 2010 by Roy Thomas (writer) and Mike Hawthorne (artist) and ran for twelve issues.

A fourth series, Conan the Barbarian, began in February 2012 by Brian Wood (writer) and Becky Cloonan (artist). It ran for twenty-five issues, and expanded on Robert E. Howard's Queen of the Black Coast.

A fifth series, Conan the Avenger, began in April 2014 by Fred Van Lente (writer) and Brian Ching (artist). It ran for twenty-five issues, and expanded on Robert E. Howard's The Snout in the Dark and A Witch Shall Be Born.

Dark Horse's sixth series, Conan the Slayer, began in July 2016 by Cullen Bunn (writer) and Sergio Dávila (artist).

In 2018, Marvel reacquired the rights and started new runs of both Conan the Barbarian and Savage Sword of Conan in January/February 2019. Conan is also a lead in the Savage Avengers title, which launched in 2019 and received a second volume in 2022.

In 2022, it was revealed that Titan Publishing Group had acquired the rights from Heroic Signatures to make Conan comics, with a new ongoing series set to release in May 2023.

=== Games ===
==== Board games ====
- Hyborian Risk is an unofficial variant for the Risk boardgame based on the Conan mythos, published in The Space Gamer magazine in issue 37 (March, 1981).
- In 2009, Fantasy Flight Games released the Age of Conan strategy board game, depicting warfare between the Hyborian nations in the Conan's adventures.
- In 2016, Monolith Board Games LLC released a new boardgame with miniatures directly based on Howard's short stories. Conan (previously known as Conan: Hyborian Quests) pits one player, controlling the evil forces, against 2-4 other players controlling Conan and his companions.

==== Collectible card games ====
- In 2006, Comic Images released the Conan Collectible Card Game designed by Jason Robinette.

==== Play-by-mail games ====
- Hyborian War, introduced by Reality Simulations, Inc. as of 1985, is a play-by-mail game set in the Hyborian Age.

==== Role-playing games ====
TSR, Inc., which in 1982 had introduced a barbarian character class inspired by the Conan character, made a licensing agreement in 1984 to publish Conan-related gaming material:

- Two modules for Advanced Dungeons & Dragons:
  - CB1 Conan Unchained! (1984)
  - CB2 Conan Against Darkness! (1984)
- The Conan Role-Playing Game (1985), with 3 official game adventures:
  - CN1 Conan the Buccaneer (1985)
  - CN2 Conan the Mercenary (1985)
  - CN3 Conan Triumphant (1985)
- Three Endless Quest books by TSR allow the reader to play the role of Conan:
  - Conan the Undaunted (1984)
  - Conan and the Prophecy (1984)
  - Conan the Outlaw (1984)

In 1988 Steve Jackson Games acquired a Conan license and started publishing Conan solo adventures for its GURPS generic system of rules as of 1988 and a GURPS Conan core rulebook in 1989:

- GURPS Conan: Beyond Thunder River (1988, solo adventure)
- GURPS Conan (1989, core rulebook)
- GURPS Conan and the Queen of the Black Coast (1989, solo adventure)
- GURPS Conan: Moon of Blood (1989, solo adventure)
- GURPS Conan the Wyrmslayer (1989, solo adventure)

In 2003 the British company Mongoose Publishing bought a license and acquired in turn the rights to make use of the Conan gaming franchise, publishing a Conan role-playing game from 2004 until 2010. The game ran the OGL System of rules that Mongoose established for its OGL series of games:

- Conan: The Roleplaying Game (2004), with many supplements.

In 2010 Mongoose Publishing dropped the Conan license. In February 2015, another British company, Modiphius Entertainment, acquired the license, announcing plans to put out a new Conan role-playing game in August of that year. Actually, the core rulebook was not launched (via Kickstarter) until a whole year later, in February 2016, reaching by far all funds needed for publication. Long after the Kickstarter ended the core rulebook was launched in PDF format on January 31, 2017. The physical core rulebook finally started distribution in June 2017:

- Conan: Adventures in an Age Undreamed Of (hardcover, 368 pages, 2017), with two hardcover supplements already published and at least 17 additional supplements in the works (as planned following the Kickstarter).

==== Video games ====
Multiple video games have been released based on the Conan mythos.

- In 1984, Datasoft released Conan: Hall of Volta for Apple II, Atari 8-bit computers, and Commodore 64.
- In 1991, Mindscape released Conan: The Mysteries of Time for NES and a Commodore 64 version by System 3.
- In 1991, Virgin Games and Synergistic released Conan: The Cimmerian for Amiga and MS-DOS.
- In 2004, TDK Mediactive released Conan, a third-person action game for Windows, PlayStation 2, Xbox, and GameCube.
- In 2007, THQ and Nihilistic released Conan, a third-person action game for PlayStation 3 and Xbox 360.
- In 2008, Funcom released Age of Conan, a MMORPG, on May 20 in the US and May 23 in Europe.
- A RPG game titled Conan: The Tower of the Elephant was released for the iOS around the time of the release of the movie Conan the Barbarian as a promotion. The game is based on the short story of the same name.
- In 2013, the side-scrolling shooter game Broforce introduced a playable character known as Bronan the Brobarian. In the game, he is one of the few characters who does not fight with a firearm or an explosive. Instead, Bronan fights with a sword that can cause massive shockwaves depending on how long the player holds the attack button.
- On January 31, 2017, Funcom released Conan Exiles for PS4, Xbox One, and Windows. The title is an open-world survival game. The game was released in early access, and was released on May 8, 2018.
- In 2019, Funcom released a real-time strategy game named Conan Unconquered.
- Conan the Barbarian, based on Schwarzenegger's likeness, appears as a playable character in Mortal Kombat 1 via the "Khaos Reigns" DLC pack, voiced by Chris Cox.

== Characters ==
=== Prose fiction ===
- Bêlit – Self-styled Shemite Queen of the Black Coast, captain of the pirate ship Tigress, and Conan's first serious lover ("Queen of the Black Coast").
- Ctesphon - The king of Stygia is mentioned only once and in passing, in "The Phoenix on the Sword". He is a priest king, like Thugra-Khotan in the Stygian daughter-kingdom of Kutchemes.
- Thoth-Amon – Stygian wizard of great power who appeared in the first Conan story written ("The Phoenix on the Sword") and was mentioned in "The God in the Bowl" and The Hour of the Dragon. L. Sprague de Camp and Lin Carter made Thoth-Amon the nemesis of Conan. In the Marvel comics, Thoth-Amon was also Conan's lifelong opponent and had a striking appearance designed by Barry Windsor-Smith; he wore a distinctive ram-horn ornamental headdress. In "The Phoenix on the Sword" though, where Thoth has been robbed of his magical ring, he doesn't at all seem very impressive, yet less admirable. He is portrayed by Pat Roach in Conan the Destroyer.
- Valeria – Aquilonian female mercenary affiliated with the Red Brotherhood ("Red Nails").
- Yara – Evil wizard and adversary of Conan ("The Tower of the Elephant") who enslaved Yag-Kosha, an extraterrestrial being resembling the Hindu god Ganesh.
- Yasmina- Brave, proud, feisty, wise, and warmhearted queen over the ancient kingdom of Vendhya, homeland and stronghold of Asura-worship.
- Zenobia – Seraglio concubine Conan promises to wed and make queen of Aquilonia (The Hour of the Dragon).

=== Comic books ===
- Fafnir – A pastiche of Fafhrd from the sword-and-sorcery stories of Fafhrd and the Gray Mouser by Fritz Leiber. He is a mighty red-bearded Vanir warrior and pirate captain. At first he and Conan are enemies, but they soon become allies after being shipwrecked.
- Zula - (Marvel comics character); a Darfarian warrior reluctantly educated in the ways of sorcery. He was of royal blood and the last of his tribe. Zula also is an ally of Conan and Red Sonja.
- Jenna – (Marvel comics character). A dancing girl from the city of Shadizar. She becomes Conan's girlfriend after he saves her from a monstrous bat, but later betrays him to the authorities. Conan gets his revenge by throwing her into a pool of sewage. Based on an unnamed character in the prose story "Rogues in the House".
- Mikhal "the Vulture" Oglu – In Marvel comics' Conan the Barbarian #23, Mikhal Oglu is Yezdigerd's enforcer and the greatest swordsman in Turan. He challenges Conan but is defeated and his severed head is sent to Yezdigerd in an ornate casket intended for Conan's head. He was inspired by a character in a non-Conan story by Robert E. Howard ("The Shadow of the Vulture").
- Kulan Gath – a prominent evil wizard appearing initially in the Marvel Conan comics and later fully integrated into the Marvel Universe. He has also appeared in Red Sonya comics by Dynamite Entertainment.
- Red Sonja – An Hyrkanian warrior created by Roy Thomas and Barry Windsor-Smith for the Conan comics. She was based on the Howard character, Red Sonya of Rogatino, who appeared in "The Shadow of the Vulture", a novella set in the 16th century.
- Yezdigerd – Ruler of Turan, a Turkish empire-based civilization. He employs Conan as a mercenary but betrays him after he outlived his usefulness
- Zukala – A character from the Conan comics published by Marvel, inspired by a poem by Robert E. Howard. Zukala is an evil sorcerer who gains his powers from a mask. His daughter, Zephra, falls in love with Conan.
- Elric – A powerful magician and ruler of the ancient empire of Melnibone who befriends Conan and unsuccessfully attempts to prevent Zephra's death. Based on the character created by Michael Moorcock.

=== Films ===
- Akiro – A character from the two Schwarzenegger Conan films. He is a powerful wizard, known as the Wizard of the Mounds, who befriends Conan and Subotai; also serves as the narrator and Conan's chronicler. He is played by Japanese actor Mako Iwamatsu.
- Subotai – Hyrkanian thief and archer. He is Conan's companion in the 1982 film. Played by Gerry Lopez.
- Princess Yasmina - Princess of Zamora and daughter of King Osric in the 1982 film, brainwashed by Thulsa Doom into part of his snake cult until rescued by Conan; becoming one of his closest comrades and lover by the end. Played by French actress Valérie Quennessen.
- Thorgrim – Hammer-wielding minion of Thulsa Doom in the 1982 film. Played by Sven-Ole Thorsen.
- Rexor – In the 1982 film, the chief priest of Thulsa Doom's snake cult, who stole the sword of Conan's father. Played by Ben Davidson.
- Thulsa Doom – A skull-faced necromancer from a King Kull story, a recurring villain in the Kull comics, and the antagonist in the 1982 film, played by James Earl Jones.
- Princess Jehnna - Young princess of Shadizar in the 1984 sequel, she joins Conan on a quest set by her aunt Queen Taramis to find and retrieve a mystical horn that had the power to restore an ancient God of Shadizar; gaining unrequited feelings for him all the while. Played by British actress Olivia d'Abo in her debut.
- Malak – A thief. He is Conan's traveling companion in the 1984 sequel. Played by Tracey Walter.
- Zula - Based on the character from the comics, but made female in the 1984 sequel, Zula is the last of her tribe and became a thief/raider until she was captured and tortured by a village only to be rescued by Conan and becoming a devoted ally of his (with possible hints of attraction towards him). Played by Jamaican actress and model Grace Jones.
- Bombaata - Servant of Queen Taramis and captain of the Shadizar royal guard in the 1984 sequel, Bombaata travels with Conan's team under the guise of Princess Jehnna's bodyguard in order to get the Jeweled Horn of Dagoth. Played by Wilt Chamberlain.
- Queen Taramis - Ruling Queen of Shadizar and aunt of Princess Jehnna, Taramis hires Conan to escort her niece on a perilous journey to retrieve the Jeweled Horn of Dagoth; with the empty promise of returning his lost love back to life as his reward. Played by British actress Sarah Douglas.

== Copyright and trademark status ==
The name Conan and the names of some of Robert E. Howard's other characters are claimed as trademarked by Conan Properties International and licensed to Cabinet Entertainment, both entities controlled by CEO Fredrik Malmberg.

Since Robert E. Howard's Conan stories were published at a time when the date of publication was the marker (1932–1963), however, and any new owners failed to renew them to maintain the copyrights, the exact copyright status of all of Howard's 'Conan' works is in question. The majority of Howard's Conan fiction exist in at least two versions, subject to different copyright standards, namely 1) the original Weird Tales publications before or shortly after Howard's death, which are generally understood to be public domain and 2) restored versions based upon manuscripts which were unpublished during Howard's lifetime.

The character of Conan is considered to be in the public domain already in the United States due to the 1932 story not renewing its copyright in 1961, 28 years after it was published. Despite claims to the contrary from some sources claiming Conan won't enter the public domain until 2028.

The Australian site of Project Gutenberg hosts digital copies of many of Howard's stories, including several works about Conan.

In the United Kingdom and the European Union, works are released into the public domain 70 years after the death of an author. Howard died in 1936, so his works have been in the public domain there since 2007, including in Malmberg's home country of Sweden.

In August 2018, Conan Properties International LLC won by default a suit against Spanish sculptor Ricardo Jove Sanchez after he failed to appear at court in the United States. Jove had started a crowdfunding campaign that raised around €3000 on Kickstarter, with the intent of selling barbarian figurines to online customers, including those in the United States (despite Conan already being public domain there due to the first story's lapsed copyright renewal). The Magistrate Judge originally recommended statutory damages for infringement on three Robert E. Howard characters not including Conan, but Jove was eventually fined $3,000 per character used in the campaign, including Conan, for a total of $21,000.

In September 2020, it was announced that Netflix had made a larger deal involving Malmberg and Mark Wheeler from Pathfinder Media between Netflix and Conan Properties International for the exclusive rights to the Conan library for the rights for live-action and animated films and TV shows.

In 2024, British author and Eisner Award winner John Allison started to publish a Conan serial online, with a tongue-in-cheek narrative heavily intermingled with characters from his own works. However, he took the unfinished comic down in late April, after receiving a cease-and-desist letter from Conan Properties International. Allison notes that to his understanding Conan "is in the public domain in the UK (where I live and work)", but that he does not have "the time or energy to contest this".
