= John C. Hocking =

American novelist

- Born: 1960 (age 65–66)
- Occupations: Novelist, short story author
- Writing career
- Genre: Fantasy
- Notable work: Conan and the Emerald Lotus

John C. Hocking (born 1960) is an American fantasy writer, the author of a Conan novel published by Tor Books and a number of short stories. One of his stories, "The Face in the Sea", won the 2009 Harper's Pen Award for Sword and Sorcery fiction.

== Writing career ==
According to Hocking, he wrote his Conan novel Conan and the Emerald Lotus out of dissatisfaction with the Conan novels being published in the early 1990s, "trying to put into the story all the things I thought were missing from Conan pastiche at that time." After taking three years to write it, he was proud enough of the result that he "didn't want to just drop it into a drawer ....[s]o I sent out a handful of letters, and L. Sprague de Camp responded ...that if I sent him my book he'd look it over. He liked it a lot and LOTUS was published." After its success he spent two years writing a second Conan novel, Conan and the Living Plague, under contract with Conan Properties, which was "sufficiently pleased with the book that they wanted to use it to attract a new publisher for Conan and try to break into hardcover." Publication of it and a third Conan novel Hocking had started were canceled due to a change in ownership of Conan Properties. In June 2024 an omnibus hardcover containing Conan and the Emerald Lotus and Conan and the Living Plague was published by Titan Books under the title Conan: City of the Dead.

Hocking has also published a number of fantasy stories, most forming a series featuring the original character Brand the Viking.

== Bibliography ==
=== Conan series ===
- Conan: City of the Dead (2024, Omnibus of)
  - Conan and the Emerald Lotus (1995)
  - Conan and the Living Plague
- Black Starlight (novella, 2023)

=== Short stories ===
==== Brand the Viking ====
- "Vali's Wound" (2004)
- "The Face in the Sea" (2009)
- "The Bonestealer's Mirror" (2010)

==== Other ====
- "A River Through Darkness and Light" (2011)

== See also ==
- Conan the Barbarian
