= Conan the Cimmerian (video game) =

1991 video game

- Developer: Synergistic Software
- Publisher: Virgin Games
- Series: Conan the Barbarian
- Platforms: Amiga, MS-DOS
- Release: 1991
- Genre: Action-adventure
- Mode: Single-player

Conan the Cimmerian is an action-adventure video game with RPG elements developed by Synergistic Software. It was published by Virgin Games in 1991 for Amiga and MS-DOS.

== Gameplay ==
The player takes on the role of the titular Conan, a blacksmith living in the village of Irskuld, Cimmeria, who takes revenge on those who raided his home and killed his beloved wife. He discovers that the one responsible for this act was a wizard named Thoth Amon - a high priest of Cult of Set. Conan travels to the land of Hyborea, to the city of Shadizar. The game consists of three types of areas. The first one is an overland map in which travel between towns or other places is possible. The second one is horizontal third person movement through the city or underneath it, talking to people and visiting buildings. The last one is viewed in vertical third person and occurs when the player enters a building or starts a fight.

== Reception ==
Charles Ardai reviewed the game for Computer Gaming World, and stated that "At least, unlike most games of this ilk, Virgin has taken a stab at making Conan a creature of flesh and blood, rather than just another bunch of testosterone-tinted pixels. By letting players participate in the birth of their hero, an added layer of interest, if not actual depth, takes shape. Nietzsche it ain't, but Howard it is!"

Jim Trunzo reviewed Conan, the Cimmerian in White Wolf #30 (Feb., 1992), rating it a 4 out of 5 and stated that "There aren't many fantasy heroes who stir the imagination as readily as Conan. Virgin Games gives us a chance to experience a little of what it must be like to be Robert E. Howard's infamous warrior king."
