= Bêlit =

Fictional character created by Robert E. Howard

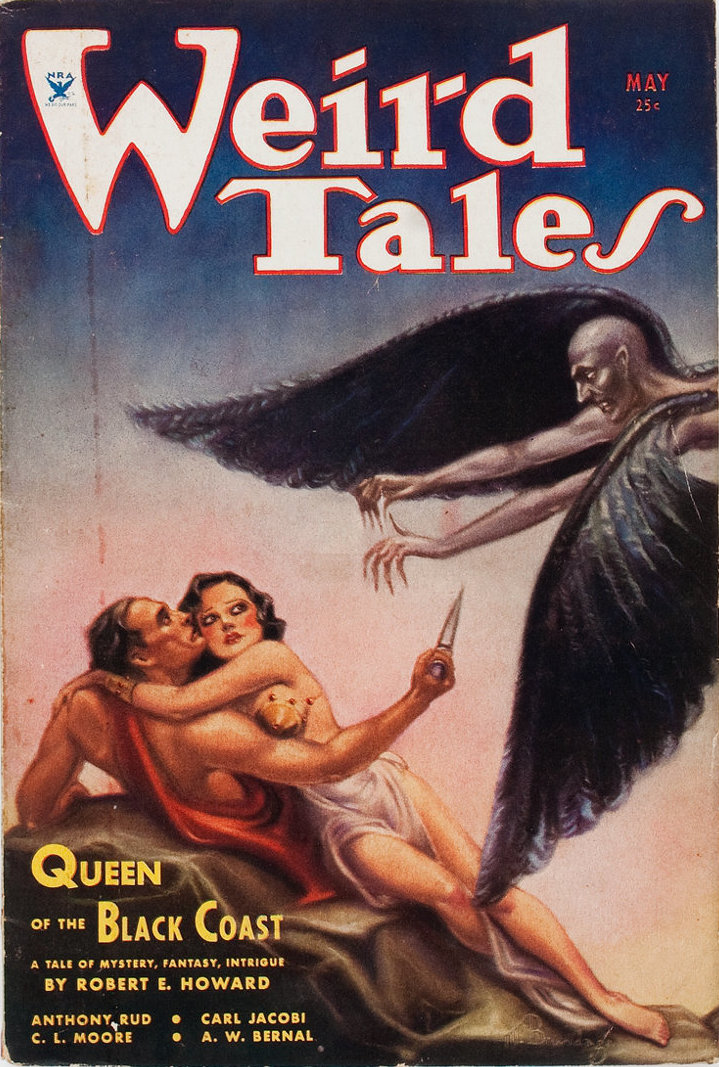
Bêlit and Conan under attack A Margaret Brundage painting for the cover of the May 1934 issue of Weird Tales

Bêlit is a character appearing in the fictional universe of Robert E. Howard's Conan the Barbarian. She is a pirate queen who has a romantic relationship with Conan. She appears in Howard's Conan short story "Queen of the Black Coast", first published in Weird Tales #23 (5 May 1934). She is the first substantial female character to appear in Howard's Conan stories. Partly thanks to her substantial appearance in the Marvel Comics' Conan series, the character is recognized as being Conan's "true love".

She was selected as the fourth-greatest pirate by Wired magazine's Geekdad blog.

== Appearance ==
As a native of the Hyborian nation of Shem, Bêlit is Shemite. Her name may have been taken from Bel, god of thieves in her native land. (Historically, Bêlit was an Akkadian (meaning "lady, mistress"), and appearing in Greek form as Beltis (Βελτις), considered to be the name of the wife of the god Bêl.)

Apart from jewellery, she wears only sandals and a red silk girdle. Despite her race and her lack of clothing in the tropical sun, her skin is "ivory white".

She is described in her first appearance:

She turned toward Conan, her bosom heaving, her eyes flashing. Fierce fingers of wonder caught at his heart. She was slender, yet formed like a goddess: at once lithe and voluptuous. Her only garment was a broad silken girdle. Her white ivory limbs and the ivory globes of her breasts drove a beat of fierce passion through the Cimmerian's pulse, even in the panting fury of battle. Her rich black hair, black as a Stygian night, fell in rippling burnished clusters down her supple back. Her dark eyes burned on the Cimmerian.

— Robert E. Howard, "Queen of the Black Coast'

== Character ==
"Who is Bêlit?" The wildest she-devil unhanged. Unless I read the signs awrong, it was her butchers who destroyed that village on the bay. May I some day see her dangling from the yard-arm! She is called the queen of the black coast. She is a Shemite woman, who leads black raiders. They harry the shipping and have sent many a good tradesman to the bottom.

— Robert E. Howard, "Queen of the Black Coast"

As a pirate Bêlit ranges across the coast of Kush (Hyborian Africa) and as far north as Zingara (Hyborian Spain) aboard her ship, the Tigress. She calls herself the "Queen of the Black Coast" and her crew appear to regard her with awe. She seems to have no problem as the only woman in a ship with an all-male pirate crew, evidently having made it abundantly clear to them that any sexual approach against her will would be out of the question, nor do any of the crew manifest jealousy when she takes up Conan as her lover.

She is described as a passionate and elemental woman. She and Conan fall in love at first sight - even though that first sight is in the middle of a battle, both facing each other with swords in their hands and Conan having just killed many of Bêlit's crew.

Despite her strength as a warrior, she is rendered subservient by her love for Conan, as Imola Bulgodzi writes in Conan Meets the Academy: Multidisciplinary Essays on the Enduring Barbarian: "The fact that Bêlit strips naked, tears off her ornaments and performs her mating-dance on the blood-stained deck, then throws herself at Conan's feet, clearly shows that she gives herself to this man and by giving herself she also takes a subordinate position. Despite her successful command of a pirate ship and a crew of black giants, Howard allows Bêlit no equality with Conan; she experiences their lovemaking as well in terms of subordination: 'you have held and crushed and conquered me'."

Bêlit is, however, strongly avaricious which is described as a racial trait: "The Shemite soul finds a bright drunkenness in riches and material splendor, and the sight of this treasure might have shaken the soul of a sated emperor of Shushan." It is this that leads to her death, killed by an ancient winged ape-like creature - hanged from the yard arm of her own ship by a ruby necklace stolen from a city of the "old ones".

She temporarily returns from death, as she had vowed, to protect her lover from the same creature's attack later in the story.

It was from Bêlit that Conan—native of a landlocked country and a complete landlubber at the beginning of "Queen of the Black Coast"—learned how to be a sailor and a pirate. During their entire time together, Conan was content to follow Bêlit's lead, and never disputed her authority: "Conan generally agreed to her plans. Hers was the mind that directed their raids, his the arm that carried out her ideas. It was a good life." Conan proved an apt pupil, and after Bêlit's death had a long piratical career on his own.

== Fiction ==
Bêlit was a fearsome yet beautiful pirate queen of the Hyborian Age who became the lover of Conan the Cimmerian. Often regarded as Conan's first and greatest love, she was tragically killed at the height of their romance. Bêlit was originally created in 1934 by fantasy author Robert E. Howard. She made her first appearance in the anthology magazine Weird Tales as the titular character of the short story "Queen of the Black Coast". In the Howard canon she had only this one appearance, being killed at the end of the same short story where she was introduced. However, Poul Anderson added a book-length description of Conan's life and adventures with Bêlit in the 1980 Conan the Rebel.

== Comics ==
Bêlit made her first unofficial comic book appearance in 1952 in Mexico, starring in her own series called Reina de la Costa Negra (Spanish for Queen of the Black Coast), written by Loa and Víctor Rodríguez and drawn by Salvador Lavalle. In 1976, Bêlit made her first official American comic book appearance in Marvel's Conan the Barbarian #58, written by Roy Thomas and drawn by John Buscema and Steven Gan.

=== Mexican comics ===
Bêlit's earliest known comic book appearance was in a Mexican comic book series first published in 1952 by Ediciones JOMA. Though unlicensed, the stories were loosely based on the adventures of Howard's most popular character, Conan. But the publishers regarded Bêlit as the more interesting character, so she became the protagonist of the series and it was titled La Reina de La Costa Negra (The Queen of the Black Coast) after her. Conan himself was relegated to sidekick status and was blond and Viking-like instead of dark. There were other notable differences between the Mexican Bêlit and Howard's original: her ship was called the Venganza ("Vengeance") instead of the Tigress, and it was crewed by Vikings rather than black corsairs. Because the Mexican Bêlit was the star of the series, she survived the deadly encounter with the winged monster that killed her in Howard's story arc. When publication of the title finally ended in the early 1960s, her character was still alive and well.

The Mexican Bêlit wore an animal pelt skirt, a Spanish Conquistador-like helmet, and round metal breastplates very similar to those later worn by Marvel's Valkyrie. In early issues the breastplates were the only clothing she wore above the waist, giving her a metal bikini top. Later she usually wore a chain mail shirt along with the breastplates. Though generally depicted as a strong warrior woman, Bêlit was often shown in peril or in bondage on the covers, as was typical of pulp comic covers of the 1950s and 1960s.

=== Marvel ===
In the 1970s, Bêlit appeared as a major supporting character in Marvel's ongoing Conan the Barbarian title. For her Marvel comic book appearance, Bêlit was given a costume that was essentially a female version of what Marvel's Conan wore: a fur loincloth, along with a matching fur sling-bikini top. She also was depicted, notably on the colored covers of Conan the Barbarian magazine issues by John Buscema, as having an explicitly clear-toned skin in contrast to Conan's bronzed skin tone. Marvel expanded upon Howard's original "Queen of the Black Coast" story in the series, culminating in her tragic death in Conan the Barbarian #100 in 1979.

Though her first appearance occurs in Conan the Barbarian #58, Bêlit was first mentioned by name in Giant-Size Conan #1 (1974) along with Valeria of the Red Brotherhood, which has led to some confusion about her appearance in this issue since only Valeria is pictured.

=== Dark Horse ===
More recently, Dark Horse acquired the rights to Conan and published their own ongoing Conan title, with Bêlit appearing in their retelling of the "Queen of the Black Coast" story arc. Dark Horse's Bêlit had an ivory-white skin as originally described by Howard, though her costume varied: she was shown wearing skimpy metal bikini tops very similar to Red Sonja's, along with silk girdles (purple rather than red), and a brown cloak, tunic, and pants for colder climates. Her depiction by Dark Horse was more frightening and feral than was depicted by Marvel.

== Appearances in other media ==
- An action figure of Bêlit was released by McFarlane Toys in 2004, as part of their first Conan series. The facial features, as in the original pulp cover, are more Hyborian (European) than Shemitish (Semitic).
- Bêlit appeared in the Marvel comic book series Conan the Barbarian as a major character in issues 58 to 100. Unlike in Robert E. Howard's original short story, Bêlit, as written by Roy Thomas, is a major character in Conan's young life. Dark Horse Comics has adapted their own version of the same story in their Conan series.
- Bêlit also appeared as a NPC in Dragon Magazine issue #57, January 1982. She was recorded in the "Giants In The Earth" section.
- Bêlit is one of the playable characters in the board game published by monolith "Conan" .
- The character Valeria featured in the film Conan the Barbarian borrowed some aspects of Howard's Bêlit, such as vowing to return from the dead to save Conan.
- Bêlit is also featured in Conan-themed products from GURPS, including the Conan campaign sourcebook and the adventure module Conan and the Queen of the Black Coast, written by Robert Traynor.
