= Paul Wade-Williams =

Role-playing game designer

- Occupation: Game designer

Paul "Wiggy" Wade-Williams is a game designer. He primarily worked on role-playing games.

== Career ==
Paul Wade-Williams was the Creative Director of Pinnacle Entertainment Group. Wade-Williams created the science-fiction horror Necropolis (2006) and the pulp science-fiction Slipstream (2008), which were the last two original settings published by Pinnacle for Savage Worlds for several years. Wade Williams founded Triple Ace Games in 2008 with Robin Eliott to publish Savage Worlds supplements. Wade-Williams created and expanded settings for Savage Worlds at Triple Ace and getting wider distribution because of a partnership with Cubicle 7 Entertainment.
