= Battleroar =

Greek metal band

Battleroar is a Greek epic metal band. They have released six studio albums.

After releasing Age of Chaos on Black Lotus Records, the band signed with Cruz del Sur Music.

== Discography ==
- Battleroar (2003)
- Age of Chaos (2005)
- To Death and Beyond... (2008)
- Blood of Legends (2014)
- Codex Epicus (2018)
- Petrichor (2026)
