= Conan Collectible Card Game =

2006 collectible card game

- Cardback to the Conan CCG
- Designers: Jason Robinette
- Publishers: Comic Images / Frogcatcher Games
- Players: 2-9
- Playing time: Approx 30 min
- Chance: Some
- Age range: 12+
- Skills: Card playing Arithmetic; Basic Reading Ability

The Conan Collectible Card Game is an out-of-print collectible card game set in the fictional Hyborian Age of Conan the Barbarian. The game was designed by Jason Robinette, and produced by Comic Images and released in 2006.

== Game summary ==
Each player in the Conan Collectible Card Game takes on the role of Conan, attempting to earn renown throughout the land for his deeds and adventures. While each player has his or her own Conan, they are considered to be in parallel dimensions, so each exists only when it is the respective player's active turn. During this time, the opponent takes on the role of Conan's foes, attempting to defeat Conan. Victory is achieved either through earning 40 renown for one's own Conan, or through defeating the opponent's Conan.

This mechanism, where a player controls the hero forces during their turn, and the enemies during the opponent's turn, is also used in games such as The Lord of the Rings Trading Card Game.

== Card types ==
- Conan - The legendary barbarian himself. Each player begins with a Conan, but the two never directly interact.
- Foes - Enemies of Conan controlled by the rival player. Foes form their own separate Foe Deck and Foe Discard Pile.
- Allies - Friends and others who would lend assistance to Conan. Allies often have a requirement which must be met before they can be played, but stay in play until defeated or until Conan rests.
- Regions - Portions of Cimmeria and other lands. Regions influence other cards in play, but only one region may be in play at a time for any given active Conan.
- Moves - Cards played during combat which provide bonuses or other abilities. In order to play moves, the prowess cost of the card must be paid.
- Items - Weapons and gear to assist Conan on his journeys. Most items have a minimum scar requirement which must be met before they can be played.
- Actions - Cards which can be played at various times (as indicated on the card) for their effects.

== Turn sequence ==
Players alternate turns with each turn consisting of the following phases:

- Start of Turn where renown is checked to determine if the player has won. There are also other actions which may be resolved at the start of the turn.
- Prepare Step where any number of actions, allies, and items that have the prepare keyword can be played. A player is limited to one weapon item card, one shield item card, and one body item card at a time.
- Warrior Step where foes are deployed against Conan and he battles them. After the battle is resolved, Conan can choose to press on (by moving back to the prepare step) or to rest.
- Rest Step where, if Conan chooses to rest, Conan's prowess is reset, he may spend prowess to heal, and players replenish their hands.

Since players earn renown by defeating foes, it is in their best interest to do so as quickly as possible, without getting their Conan killed. Hence, the ability to press on represents a calculated risk, where one does not receive an opportunity for prowess or hand replenishment. Players also have the option of playing more conservatively with their own Conan, and hoping that they are able to kill the rival Conan during the opponent's turns.

== Deck composition ==
Each player must provide two decks which meet the appropriate requirements. The Draw Deck must contain at least 34 non-foe cards. No more than 3 copies of any given card are allowed, with no more than 1 copy of any unique card. The Foe Deck must contain at least 21 foe cards. No more than 3 copies of any given foe card (or 1 copy of any unique card) are permitted. The total renown of the foes in the Foe Deck must total from 91 to 105 points. This brings the total cards to 55, as reflected in the 55 card starter decks, made up of a 34 cards "Draw Deck" and 21 cards "Foe Deck".
