= Belit Ilani =

Mistress of the gods in Babylonian religion

In Babylonian religion, Belit Ilani or Belet Ilani was a title described as meaning "mistress of the gods" and the name of the "evening star of desire". It has been associated with Inanna, Astarte, and Ishtar, and has been found inscribed on portraits of a woman blessing a suckling child with her right hand. Theophilus G. Pinches noted that Belit Ilani had seven different names (such as Inanna, etc.) for seven different localities in ancient Sumer.
