= Conan: Hall of Volta =

1984 video game

Conan
- Developer: SE Software
- Publishers: NA: Datasoft; EU: U.S. Gold
- Designers: Eric Robinson; Eric Parker
- Platforms: Apple II, Atari 8-bit, Commodore 64, FM-7, PC-88, Sharp X1
- Release: 1984
- Genre: Platform
- Mode: Single-player

Conan: Hall of Volta (or simply Conan on the box cover and title screen) is a platform game from American developers Eric Robinson and Eric Parker and published by Datasoft in 1984. It is based on the character Conan created by Robert E. Howard. This game was originally written for the Apple II and ported to the Commodore 64 and Atari 8-bit computers.

Released in 1984, the game's launch coincided with the debut of the film Conan the Destroyer. The box shows a painting of Arnold Schwarzenegger as the muscular warrior with his new costume for Destroyer. Despite this attempted tie-in, the game has little to do with the film besides the Cimmerian in the title role, having originally been designed as a boomerang-throwing game titled Visigoth. One of the screenshots on the back of the box is from a prototype version and shows a boomerang instead of a sword.

== Gameplay ==
Conan needs a gem.

The player controls Conan as he attacks the evil Volta in his castle fortress. Conan is armed with 10 boomerang swords. From time to time, Conan may be aided by an "Avian Ally" as he tries to defeat Volta's sinister hordes, which includes bats, scorpions, giant ants, fire-breathing dragons and floating eyeballs.

The game includes seven diverse levels requiring the player to navigate lava pits, geysers, spike pits, and floating platforms. Along the way, the player often needs to collect magic gems or keys in order to progress.

In the game, Conan does not jump, he somersaults. If he falls, he launches into a dive.

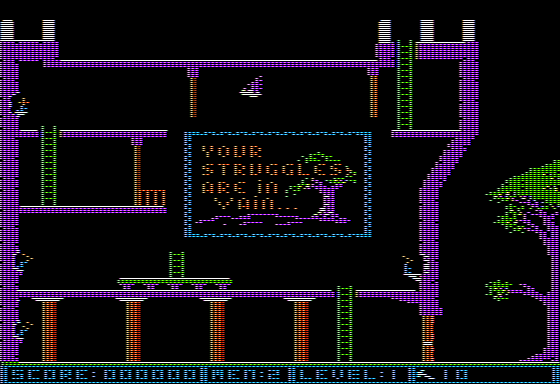
One of the four death messages on Level 1.

One innovate and original feature of the game's time was a random close-up picture that would be shown upon the player's last death. For example, dying in the first level might show a close-up picture of a bat with the caption "Bats in your Belfry". Deaths in other levels would yield a picture of a hazard unique to that level. Each level has 4 possible random death messages that can be shown:

All death messages in Conan

- 1a: Back to Cimmeria barbarian!!
- 1b: Bats in your belfry
- 1c: Your Struggles are in Vain
- 1d: Your odyssey has ended before it had begun
- 2a: A watery barrier
- 2b: Quest terminated
- 2c: There is no glory for you here
- 2d: You withdraw battered and torn
- 3a: Death at thy feet, life from above...
- 3b: You beat a heated retreat...
- 3c: Only a cleric can help you now
- 3d: You Succumb to Lassitude
- 4a: Thus, the story ended...
- 4b: Conan's Bane!
- 4c: The End
- 4d: You sink slowly into a peaceful bliss
- 5a: You shuffle off defeated for now
- 5b: To be continued...
- 5c: Adveture's End... [NOTE: Adventure is misspelt.]
- 5d: The glow from the pyre lights the room
- 6a: The eyes have it
- 6b: Thy fate is sealed
- 6c: A Shocking End
- 6d Crom awaits
- 7a: Volta's minions take you to the Loph-ka slave pits
- 7b: Volta is victorious
- 7c: You retire more dead than alive
- 7d: The Crimson Orb recedes on your horizon

== Technical Information ==
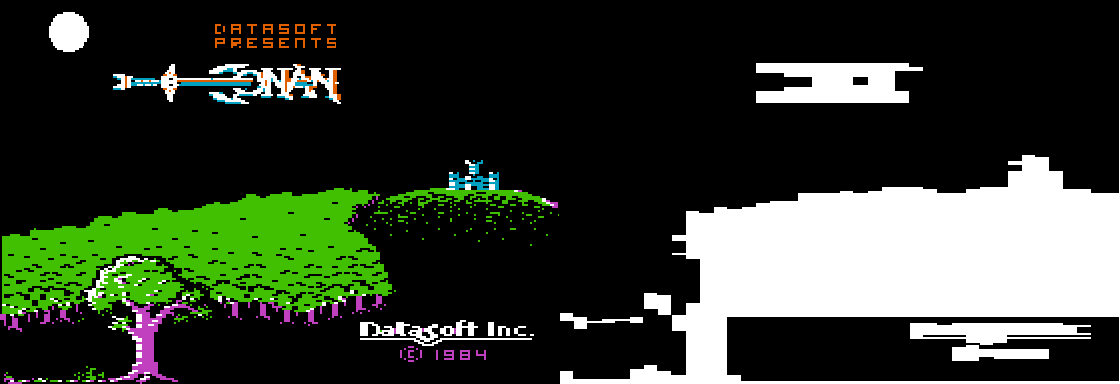
Software color buffer (page 1) and stencil buffer (page 2) on the title screen on the Apple 2

Conan was one of the earliest games to use a software 1-bit Stencil buffer for masking foreground and background objects.

== Release ==
In Bulgaria, where Conan the Barbarian was generally unknown, the Apple II version was translated into Bulgarian and distributed by ZMD Pazarjik under the name "Добрия рицар" (The Good Knight).

== Reception ==
Reception

Review score
Publication	Score
Computer+Video Games	8/10
