= Conan Role-Playing Game =

1984 Tabletop fantasy role-playing game

- Cover art by Jeffrey Butler
- Designers: Zeb Cook
- Publishers: TSR, Inc.
- Publication: 1985
- Genres: Sword and sorcery
- Systems: ZeFRS

The Conan Role-Playing Game is a fantasy role-playing game published by TSR, Inc. in 1985 that is based on the Conan the Barbarian stories by Robert E. Howard, Lin Carter, Andrew J. Offutt. and Robert Jordan.

== Description ==
Conan is a role-playing game where the players take on the roles of Conan and his companions, following adventures similar in nature and theme to Howard's stories.

=== Character generation ===
A player decides on a country of origin for their character, and then purchases talents using an allotment of 35 points. Players can gain more points by voluntarily adding a flaw to their character, such as "fear of heights" or "weakness for drink." The talents are grouped into several categories; no more than 5 points can be spent on any one talent, and at least one talent must be purchased from each category. Completing an adventure provides the player with more points with which to improve old talents or purchase new ones.

=== Skill resolution ===
To resolve any action, including combat, the player rolls a die against their character's ability in that area, then cross references the result on a color-coded result table that indicates success or failure, and the consequences.

=== Scenario ===
The game comes with an introductory scenario, The Tower of the Elephant, adapted from Howard's story of the same name.

== Publication history ==
In 1984, TSR published Marvel Super Heroes, a role-playing game designed by Jeff Grubb, although Grubb acknowledged he received assistance from Zeb Cook.

The following year, Zeb Cook adapted the rules from Marvel Super Heroes for a new role-playing game, Conan. This boxed set, with cover art by Jeffrey Butler and interior art by Jeff Easley, was designed for players age 10 and up and contained a full-color map, a 32-page rule book, a 16-page reference guide of talents, weaknesses, and charts, and a 48-page notebook about the land of Hyboria plus two 10 sided dice.

TSR produced three adventures for the game in 1985:

- Conan the Buccaneer (based on the novel by Lin Carter)
- Conan the Mercenary (based on the novel by Andrew J. Offutt)
- Conan the Triumphant (based on the novel by Robert Jordan)

=== ZeFRS ===
Mark Krawec, a member of the RPGnet community, recovered the system from the past in 2007, named it ZeFRS (Zeb's Fantasy Roleplaying System) and published a free PDF document where the game mechanics had been completely expurgated from any licensed Conan material. Two years later, in 2009, a ZeFRS paperback book was printed and distributed.

== Reception ==
Mike Dean reviewed Conan RPG for Imagine magazine, and stated that "In conclusion, this game has some interesting concepts but is lacking in certain respects, notably the magic system and the slant towards the younger gamer."

Pete Tamlyn reviewed Conan for White Dwarf #69, giving it an overall rating of 7 out of 10, and stated that "It's a great shame. With a bit of care it could have been a very good product. Most of the errors are essentially cosmetic and even with them I still prefer it to AD&D."

In Issue 45 of Different Worlds C.J. Henderson found the rules "not particularly well-organized, and there are occasional references to things which are either poorly explained or not covered at all. Henderson noted that "Compared to many other roleplaying combat systems, Conan can best be described as crude. This is not to say ill-conceived, but rather that it does not bog gamemasters and players down with infinite, time-consuming detail." XXX did not like the introductory scenario, pointing out that anyone familiar with Howard's stories would know the entire plot. Henderson also felt the adventure "railroaded" the players along only one possible storyline. Henderson concluded by giving the game a rating of 3 out of 4, saying, "If you can enjoy the freedom of using an easily-learned rules set that leaves plenty of options, Conan is great. It makes a pleasant break from more detailed fantasy campaigning and it is certain to have its players rereading the Conan stories in search of inspiration."

In his 1990 book The Complete Guide to Role-Playing Games, game critic Rick Swan thought this game was perfect for beginners, writing, "Though clearly not as sophisticated as say, Advanced Dungeons & Dragons, the game's streamlined rules and clearly defined characters make it an excellent introduction to fantasy role-playing." Swan did note "That Conan remains true to its source material is both a strong point and a weakness. Fans of the Howard stories will feel right at home, but others may feel frustrated by the narrow focus; magic, for instance, is downplayed here, as it is in the stories." Swan concluded by giving the game a rating of 3 out of 4, saying, "As for solving the game's biggest problem — namely, which player gets to play Conan — the referee is on his own."

== See also ==
- Conan Unchained!
- Conan Against Darkness!
- GURPS Conan
- Conan: The Roleplaying Game
- Conan: Adventures in an Age Undreamed Of
