= Conan: The Roleplaying Game =

2004 Tabletop role-playing game

Conan
The Roleplaying Game
- First-edition cover by Chris Quilliams
- Designers: Ian Sturrock; Paul Tucker; Harvey Barker; Vincent Darlage; Gareth Hanrahan (second edition only)
- Publishers: Mongoose Publishing
- Publication: 2004; 22 years ago
- Genres: Sword and sorcery
- Systems: d20 System/OGL System

Conan: The Roleplaying Game is a sword and sorcery British role-playing game based on the d20 System first published in January 2004 by Mongoose Publishing, mainly designed by Ian Sturrock and set in the fictional Hyborian Age of Conan the Barbarian, created by Robert E. Howard in the 1930s.

== Development ==
The game's development started when Mongoose Publishing acquired the license for a Conan roleplaying game in 2003. In December 2003, the first printing was ready, and Mongoose published and distributed the game in January 2004. This first printing included an illustrated map of the Thurian continent during the Hyborian Age, painted by Spanish artist Jesús Barony. In August 2004, Mongoose released a reprint of the first edition, subtitled the Atlantean Edition, and Barony's map was replaced by another map from American cartographer Clayton Bunce. Bunce's map also released in a folded poster format with the gamemaster's screen.

Mongoose published a second edition in 2007, with numerous supplements compatible with both editions. In 2010, Mongoose dropped the license and canceled the entire line.

== Translations ==
During the game's run, the Atlantean Edition was translated into Spanish, in Spain, by the Spanish publishing house Edge Entertainment in 2005 and into French, in France, by the UbIK editor (based in Toulouse) in 2007. In September 2008, both editors, the French UbIK and the Spanish Edge Entertainment, merged, but the French partner moved its headquarters from France to Spain and adopted the Spanish name as Edge Entertainment France.

In 2006, the Atlantean Edition was also translated into Italian (as Conan il gioco di ruolo) by the publishing houses Stratelibri and Wyrd Edizioni.

== Setting ==
The core rulebooks include a volume of information and data sourced from Howard's material and literature.

== System ==
The game's game mechanics is Mongoose's adaptation of the d20 System as licensed by the OGL System.

=== Character creation ===
The game does not feature non-human races at all. Instead, players choose a race from one of the ethnicities depicted in the fictional world.

== Books ==
=== Core rulebooks ===
- Conan: The Roleplaying Game (1st Edition, hardcover, 352 p., January 2004)
- Conan: The Roleplaying Game (Atlantean Edition, hardcover, 352 p., August 2004: second printing of the 1st Edition)
- Conan: The Roleplaying Game (Pocket Edition, softcover, January 2005)
- Conan: The Roleplaying Game (2nd Edition, hardcover, 424 p., September 2007)

=== Supplements ===
- Across the Thunder River
- Adventures in the Hyborian Age (2nd Edition)
- Aquilonia - Flower of the West
- Argos and Zingara
- Bestiary of the Hyborian Age (2nd Edition)
- Betrayer of Asgard (2nd Edition)
- The Black Stones of Kovag-Re
- Catacombs of Hyboria (2nd Edition)
- Cimmeria (2nd Edition)
- Cities of Hyboria (2nd Edition)
- The Coming of Hanuman
- The Compendium
- Faith and Fervour
- The Free Companies
- Game Master's Screen
- The Heretics of Tarantia
- Hyboria's Fallen - Pirates, Thieves and Temptresses
- Hyboria's Fiercest - Barbarians, Borderers and Nomads
- Hyboria's Finest - Nobles, Scholars and Soldiers
- Khitai (2nd Edition)
- The Lurking Terror of Nahab
- Messantia - City of Riches
- The Pirate Isles
- Player's Guide to the Hyborian Age (2nd Edition)
- Reavers of the Vilayet
- Return to the Road of Kings (The Road of Kings 2nd Edition)
- The Road of Kings
- Ruins of Hyboria
- The Scrolls of Skelos
- The Secrets of Skelos (The Scrolls of Skelos 2nd Edition)
- Shadizar - City of Wickedness
- Shem - Gateway to the South
- Stygia - Serpent of the South
- Tales of the Black Kingdoms
- Tito's Trading Post
- The Tower of the Elephant
- Trial of Blood (2nd Edition)
- The Warrior's Companion (2nd Edition)

== Reviews ==
- Backstab #47
- Rebel Times #3

== See also ==
- Conan Unchained!
- Conan Against Darkness!
- Conan Role-Playing Game
- Conan: Adventures in an Age Undreamed Of
- GURPS Conan
