= Conan: The Mysteries of Time =

1991 video game

Conan
- Cover art (NES)
- Developer: Eastridge Technology
- Publisher: Mindscape
- Composer: Nick Eastridge
- Platform: NES
- Release: NA: February 1991
- Genre: Action
- Mode: Single-player

Conan (also known as Conan: The Mysteries of Time) is a side-scrolling action video game for the Nintendo Entertainment System released in 1991. It was developed by Eastridge Technology and published by Mindscape. While it features the Conan the Barbarian character, it is an adaptation of the computer game Myth: History in the Making developed by System 3, not the 1982 film starring Arnold Schwarzenegger.

== Gameplay ==
One night, the titular Conan, who seeks the throne of Aquilonia, is informed of a legend by a mysterious old man named Nemonios popping out of a campfire; there are Four Urns of the kingdom's Early Kings that have vanished from their location in the Crypt of Cahalla, and whoever returns these Urns shall gain the throne.

Conan is an action-adventure video game that lasts six levels: the Catacombs of Belveras, the Ruins of Ry-leeh in Brythunia, Kordavo at the "mouth" of the Black River, the Forests of Asgard, the Sky Castle of Vanaheim, and the Tombs of Zamboula, the location of the four Urns. It is also a puzzle game, as the player has to figure out the hidden locations of special weapons to complete bosses; info about the items are in the game's instruction manual, except for the location.

== Reception ==
Reception

Review scores
| Publication | Score |
|---|---|
| AllGame | 1/5 |
| Exposed | 1.5/10 |
| GamePro | 3.6/5 (Note: GamePro gave Conan 5/5 for challenge, 2/5 for gameplay, 3/5 for sound, and two 4/5 ratings for graphics and fun factor.) |

Critical reviews for Conan were mixed-to-negative; Skyler Miller of AllGame called it one of the worst NES titles ever, the author of Video Game Bible, 1985–2002, Andy Slaven, labeled it "platform gaming at its worst," and Game Players journalist Jeff Lundrigan described it as an interesting "combat puzzle" gameplay idea marred by poor execution.

The difficulty was frequently criticized, with reviewers claiming that it's near impossible to get past the first level and beat the game without cheat codes. Lundrigan noted that while the character jumps in the air, his movement stops when hit by an enemy, leading to instant kills as a result of falling in bottomless pits. Brett Weiss wrote the player had to work with "pitiful, sluggish attacks (including short-range punches, limp swordsmanship, and hard-to-execute jump kicks)."

Reviews, even a positive one from GamePro also attributed the difficulty to the awkward controls, criticizing decisions of pressing down to jump and having to push both an A-or-B button and the D-pad to perform movements like ducking. The backgrounds were also dismissed as bland.
