= Conan (2004 video game) =

- Developer: Cauldron
- Publisher: TDK Mediactive Europe
- Platforms: Windows, Xbox, GameCube, PlayStation 2
- Release: EU: April 7, 2004; UK: April 8, 2004
- Genres: Action-adventure, hack and slash
- Modes: Single-player, multiplayer

Conan is a 2004 action-adventure game based on the literary character Conan the Barbarian created by Robert E. Howard. It was developed by Slovak developer Cauldron and released for the Xbox, GameCube, PlayStation 2, and Microsoft Windows in Europe.

== Gameplay ==
Conan is a third-person action-adventure game with the majority of the action being real-time hack and slash combat, with additional puzzles. The player can acquire up to 14 different weapons and learn new fighting techniques similar to other role-playing video games. There are more than 70 levels, spanning from volcanoes to jungles, in which Conan faces 12 bosses and collects pieces of a legendary Atlantean sword.

There was a multiplayer mode via Xbox Live where players could compete in three different game modes, play in more than 16 different maps, and had 16 different characters to play as. Although Xbox Live support for original Xbox games was terminated in 2010, Conan is now supported on the revival online servers for the Xbox called Insignia.

== Plot ==
The events take place in the mythical era from the original books and comics known as the "Hyborian Age". When Conan sees his home village of Grannach burnt to the ground by the mysterious Vulture cult, he begins his quest for revenge against them.

== Development ==
Conan was developed by Cauldron. After completion of their previous game, they got the idea of making a Conan the Barbarian video game. Publisher TDK Mediactive Europe obtained the licenses for Robert E. Howard's works, enabling them to make a game based on the intellectual property. The plot was written by Jan Kanturek, a Czech translator of Howard's work, and was inspired by the novels and comics. Meanwhile, the combat and music took inspiration from the films. The game was developed using the Conan 3D Engine,

== Reception ==
Reception

Aggregate score
Aggregator	Score
GameRankings	61% (Xbox); 51% (PC)

Review scores
Publication	Score
Official Xbox Magazine (UK)	7.7/10
PC Gamer (UK)	55/100
PC Zone	45/100

Conan received average reviews. It holds an average of 61% for Xbox and 51% for PC on aggregate website GameRankings.
