= GURPS Conan =

1989 supplement for the GURPS role-playing game

The World of Robert E. Howard's Barbarian Hero
- Cover by Kirk Reinert
- Designers: Curtis M. Scott
- Publishers: Steve Jackson Games
- Publication: 1989; 37 years ago
- Genres: Sword and sorcery
- Systems: GURPS

GURPS Conan is an sword and sorcery sourcebook for the GURPS (Generic Universal Role-Playing System), written by Curtis M. Scott, and published by Steve Jackson Games in 1991. It is based on Robert E. Howard's Conan the Barbarian, and also contains a series of solo adventures.

== Publication history ==
GURPS Conan was one of the earliest products from a licensed property produced by Steve Jackson Games. The company, after launching GURPS in 1986, acquired a Conan game license from Conan Properties International in 1988. The same year, Steve Jackson Games published a solo adventure titled GURPS Conan: Beyond Thunder River. In 1989, GURPS Conan, The World of Robert E. Howard's Barbarian Hero was published. It was written by Curtis M. Scott, with a cover by Kirk Reinert and illustrations by Butch Burcham, and was published by Steve Jackson Games as a 128-page book. Three other solo adventures followed this setting supplement, all of them also in 1989: GURPS Conan and the Queen of the Black Coast, GURPS Conan: Moon of Blood and GURPS Conan the Wyrmslayer.

=== GURPS Conan publications ===
- GURPS Conan: Beyond Thunder River (1988, a solo adventure, based on the story Beyond the Black River)
- GURPS Conan: The World of Robert E. Howard's Barbarian Hero (1989, the supplement setting for GURPS)
- GURPS Conan and the Queen of the Black Coast (1989, a solo adventure, based on the story Queen of the Black Coast)
- GURPS Conan: Moon of Blood (1989, a solo adventure, based on the story of the same name)
- GURPS Conan the Wyrmslayer (1989, a solo adventure, based on the story The Lair of the Ice Worm)

== Contents ==
GURPS Conan is a GURPS campaign setting supplement describing how to use fantasy role-playing in the Hyborian Age, including rules for character creation and running a campaign, and an introduction written by L. Sprague de Camp.

== Reception ==
In the September–October 1989 edition of Games International (Issue #9), Mike Jarvis admired the production quality of the book, calling the cover art "a nicely rendered painting showing everyone's favourite barabrian." Jarvis pointed out that "GURPS fantasy campaigns tend to be a little lacking in interesting sword fodder", so he found the seven pages of new monsters "a rare treat indeed! [...] a joy for any fantasy referee. This section would almost warrant the book's purchase." Although Jarvis found the chapter on religions "functional but uninspired", he enjoyed the gazetteer, saying, "It is here that the book really comes into its own. Each country is covered in a detail which I found surprising for such a book." However, Jarvis thought the lack of a scenario to be a detriment. He concluded by giving the book an above-average rating of 4 stars out of 5, saying, "Overall this is a most accomplished work, suitable for anyone who wants a world for the GURPS fantasy campaign, whether they're Conan fans or not. My only reservations are the reliance on [the previously published] GURPS Magic and the lack of a complete referee scenario."

== Reviews ==
- Casus Belli #76

== See also ==
- Conan Unchained! – 1984 Dungeons & Dragons adventure module
- Conan Against Darkness! – 1984 Dungeons & Dragons adventure module
- Conan Role-Playing Game – 1984 Tabletop fantasy role-playing game
- Conan: The Roleplaying Game – 2004 Tabletop role-playing game
- Conan: Adventures in an Age Undreamed Of – 2017 Tabletop role-playing game
- List of GURPS publications
