= Conan Unchained! =

1984 Dungeons & Dragons adventure module

- The cover of the module, showing Arnold Schwarzenegger as Conan.
- Code: CB1
- TSR product code: 9123
- Rules required: Advanced Dungeons & Dragons, 1st edition
- Character levels: 10–14
- Campaign setting: Conan Hyboria
- Authors: David Cook
- First published: 1984
- ISBN: 0-88038-152-3

Linked modules
- CB1, CB2

Conan Unchained! is a 1984 adventure module for the Dungeons & Dragons roleplaying game that centers on an adventure of the fictional hero Conan the Barbarian and his companions.

== Plot summary ==
Conan Unchained! is an adventure scenario that takes place while Conan is a Kozak raider and pirate operating on the Sea of Vilayet. The module includes rules for using the Hyborian Age with AD&D rules and provides game statistics and descriptions of the characters Conan, Valeria, Juma, and Nestor from the Conan novels. Some of the scenes include being captured by Kozaks and traveling to a mysterious Island to rescue Princess Amrastisi.

== Publication history ==
CB1 Conan Unchained! was written by David Cook, with art by Jeff Butler, and was published by TSR in 1984 as a 32-page booklet with an outer folder. Its TSR product code is TSR 9123.

== Reception ==
Steve Hampshire gave the module a mixed review in Imagine magazine. Hampshire felt that the module did have "some uniquely 'Conan' features", such as an almost total absence of normal AD&D monsters, which were replaced by humans. Although he thought the plot was "simple and derivative", Hampshire noted that the module provided some interesting settings and encounters. Hampshire stated that the module played well in general despite some minor glitches, and felt the module would be good for introducing players to the Conan universe, but added that further installments in the series would need stronger plot lines.

Rick Swan reviewed the adventure in The Space Gamer No. 73. Swan felt that designer David Cook gave a good shot at what he thought was "a pretty cheesy assignment" by adding new rules such as a Fear Factor for monsters to inspire terror, Luck Points to allow player characters to perform heroic feats, and a healing rule to mend wounded characters faster. Swan felt Cook had approached the Conan universe with respect although it "isn't a particularly good choice for the D&D system" due to its more grounded world building and lack of magic. Swan concluded by saying that "Conan and D&D go together like peanut butter and tuna fish—it can be done, but you can bet there's going to be a funny taste".

In his 2023 book Monsters, Aliens, and Holes in the Ground, RPG historian Stu Horvath noted, "Conan Unchained is a great example of an unenthusiastic attempt at a licensed RPG product. .. Aside from Jeff Butler's interior art ... the rest of the module is a disappointing cash-in." Horvath concluded by pointing out "the adventure is designed for pre-generated characters, and, since only one of them is Conan, three of the four players are likely to be disappointed when they're cast as the sidekicks."

== Credits ==
- David Cook: Design
- Anne Gray: Editing
- Elizabeth Riedel: Graphic design
- Kitty Thompson: Graphic design
- Jeff Butler: Interior art

== See also ==
- List of Dungeons & Dragons modules
- Conan Against Darkness!
- GURPS Conan
- Conan Role-Playing Game
- Conan: The Roleplaying Game
