= Conan Against Darkness! =

1984 Dungeons & Dragons adventure module

- The cover of the module, showing Arnold Schwarzenegger as Conan.
- Code: CB2
- TSR product code: 9124
- Rules required: Advanced Dungeons & Dragons 1st edition
- Character levels: 10-14
- Campaign setting: Hyborian
- Authors: Ken Rolston
- First published: 1984

Linked modules
- CB1, CB2

Conan Against Darkness! is a 1984 adventure module for the first edition of the Advanced Dungeons & Dragons fantasy roleplaying game, set in the Hyborian universe of Robert E. Howard's character Conan the Barbarian. It is designed for four player characters at character level 10-14 and uses some minor rule variations in an attempt to recreate the setting's atmosphere. It was publicized as containing a "journey of epic proportions".

== Plot summary ==
Conan Against Darkness! is an adventure that takes place while Conan was King of Aquilonia and features a battle against Thoth-Amon.

The adventure requires the use of some variant rules specified in the publication. These include "Fear", a faster healing rate, and "Heroism".

The publication includes four new monsters (Winged Gaunts, Crawler in the Dark, Serpent Folk, and Fire Guardians), several new magical items, and game statistics for the four suggested player characters - Conan, Pelias the Sorcerer, Nzinga the Amazon, and Prospero the General.

== Publication history ==
Conan Against Darkness! was written by Ken Rolston, with art by Jeffrey Butler and Jeff Easley, and was published by TSR in 1984 as a 32-page booklet with an outer folder.

Its module code is CB2 and its TSR product code is TSR 9124.

The module was edited by Anne C. Gray, with graphic design by Elizabeth Riedel and cartography by "Diesel".

== Reception ==
Jez Keen of Imagine magazine gave it a mixed review. He praised the cover and the overall "attractive package" of the module. However, he noted that the game could only be played effectively as Conan and his companions. Criticisms included the "disjointed and sometimes purposeless" gameplay, mundane and overwritten encounters, and that the "extreme violence and lack of clerics" made survival difficult.

== See also ==
- List of Dungeons & Dragons modules
- Conan Unchained!
- Conan Role-Playing Game
- GURPS Conan
- Conan: The Roleplaying Game
