= The Complete Chronicles of Conan =

2006 collection of short stories written by Robert E. Howard

- Cover of the first edition
- Author: Robert E. Howard
- Illustrator: Les Edwards
- Language: English
- Series: Gollancz Conan Chronicles
- Genre: Fantasy
- Publisher: Gollancz
- Publication date: 2006
- Publication place: United Kingdom
- Media type: Print (hardback)
- Pages: 925 pp
- ISBN: 0-575-07766-2
- OCLC: 62225437

The Complete Chronicles of Conan: Centenary Edition is a collection of fantasy short stories written by Robert E. Howard featuring his sword and sorcery hero Conan the Barbarian. The book was published in 2006 by Gollancz and is an omnibus of their earlier collections The Conan Chronicles, Volume 1: The People of the Black Circle and The Conan Chronicles, Volume 2: The Hour of the Dragon, though the stories are rearranged. The collection is edited by Stephen Jones and was issued to celebrate the centenary of Howard's birth. Most of the stories originally appeared in the magazines The Phantagraph, Weird Tales, Super-Science Fiction, Magazine of Horror, Fantasy Fiction, Fantasy Magazine and The Howard Collector.

== Contents ==
- "The Hyborian Age"
- "Cimmeria"
- "The Phoenix on the Sword"
- "The Scarlet Citadel"
- "The Tower of the Elephant"
- "Black Colossus"
- "The Slithering Shadow"
- "The Pool of the Black One"
- "Rogues in the House"
- "Shadows in the Moonlight"
- "Queen of the Black Coast"
- "The Devil in Iron"
- "The People of the Black Circle"
- "A Witch Shall Be Born"
- "Jewels of Gwahlur"
- "Beyond the Black River"
- "Shadows in Zamboula"
- "Red Nails"
- "The Hour of the Dragon" (poem)
- "The Hour of the Dragon"
- "The God in the Bowl"
- "The Black Stranger"
- "The Frost-Giant's Daughter"
- "Drums of Tombalku" (draft)
- "The Vale of Lost Women"
- "Wolves Beyond the Border" (Draft)
- "The Snout in the Dark" (draft)
- "The Hall of the Dead" (synopsis)
- "The Hand of Nergal" (fragment)
- Notes on Various Peoples of the Hyborian Age
- Robert E. Howard and Conan, by Stephen Jones
