= Savage Sword of Conan =

American comic series

- Cover of The Savage Sword of Conan #1 (Aug. 1974). Art by Boris Vallejo

Publication information
- Publisher: Marvel Comics
- Schedule: Monthly
- Format: Ongoing series
- Publication date: August 1974 – July 1995
- No. of issues: 235
- Main character: List: Conan Red Sonja King Kull Solomon Kane

Creative team
- Written by: List: Roy Thomas Michael Fleisher Don Kraar Larry Yakata Chuck Dixon
- Penciller: List: John Buscema Esteban Maroto Gil Kane Neal Adams Dick Giordano Ernie Chan Frank Brunner Carmine Infantino Mike Vosburg Val Mayerik Gary Kwapisz Rudy Nebres Mike Docherty
- Inker: List: Alfredo Alcala Sonny Trinidad Pablo Marcos Tony DeZuniga Danny Bulanadi
- Editor: Roy Thomas

The Savage Sword of Conan is a black-and-white magazine-format comic book series published beginning in 1974 by Curtis Magazines, an imprint of American company Marvel Comics, and then later by Marvel itself. Savage Sword of Conan starred Robert E. Howard's most famous creation, Conan the Barbarian, and has the distinction of being the longest-surviving title of the short-lived Curtis imprint.

As a "magazine", Savage Sword of Conan did not have to conform to the Comics Code Authority, making it a publication of choice for many illustrators. It soon became one of the most popular comic series of the 1970s and is now considered a cult classic. Roy Thomas was the editor and primary writer for the series' first few years (until issue 60), which featured art by illustrators such as Neal Adams, Dick Giordano, Barry Windsor-Smith, John Buscema, Alfredo Alcala, Jim Starlin, Al Milgrom, Pablo Marcos, and Walter Simonson. Painted covers were provided by such artists as Earl Norem, Bob Larkin, Joe Jusko, and Boris Vallejo.

Savage Sword of Conan was published under the Curtis imprint until issue 60, when it became part of the Marvel Magazine Group. Stories from the comic were reprinted in the Marvel UK title of the same name. The original run of Savage Sword of Conan ran until issue #235 (July 1995).

Marvel Comics reacquired the publishing rights in 2018, and started a new run of Savage Sword of Conan collected editions beginning in February 2019. In 2022, Titan Comics acquired the license to reprint the magazine in new collected editions.

In April 2019, Marvel also started a new run of Savage Sword of Conan with new material. This title ran for 12 issues until February 2020.

== Publication history ==
The adventures in Savage Sword of Conan are not always consecutive (as they are in the color Marvel title Conan the Barbarian), and they cover different eras of Conan's life. The Savage Sword stories mostly feature an older Conan, and adapt Robert E. Howard stories and pastiches starting from "Black Colossus" (according to the Miller/Clark chronology), thus following the Roy Thomas stories in Conan the Barbarian.

The first issue leads off with Thomas and Barry Windsor-Smith's adaptation of one of Howard's shortest but most well-known Conan tales, "The Frost-Giant's Daughter". This is one of Conan’s earliest tales chronologically. Still a teenager, he encounters a beautiful woman in the frozen north who leads him into an ambush by her giant brothers. Issue #2 featured another Howard adaptation, "Black Colossus", in which Conan faces off against a three-thousand-year-old sorcerer. This story teams long time Conan penciler John Buscema with his frequent partner Alcala. The cover of issue #5 sports a Boris Vallejo painting of Conan being crucified, from the story "A Witch Shall Be Born". This story features Conan at his most resilient, surviving a desert crucifixion to get revenge on the man who put him there.

Issues #6-10 included "People of the Dark", a 30-page tale scripted by Thomas and drawn by Alex Niño; the continued adaptation of Howard’s only full-length Conan novel, The Hour of the Dragon (the first parts having been printed in Giant-Size Conan #1-4); and the adaptation of "Iron Shadows in the Moon", by Buscema and Alcala, where Conan goes from chief of the Zuagirs to pirate captain of the Red Brotherhood.

The next three years of the title featured numerous adaptations of Howard stories (many by the art team of Buscema and Alcala), including "Shadows in Zamboula", "The Devil in Iron", "The People of the Black Circle", "The Slithering Shadow", "The Pool of the Black One", "The Tower of the Elephant", "Jewels of Gwahlur", "Beyond the Black River", "The Scarlet Citadel", "The Flame Knife", "Hawks Over Shem", "The Treasure of Tranicos", and "Wolves Beyond the Border".

== Collected editions ==
In 2007, Dark Horse Comics began issuing a series of trade paperbacks, collecting and reprinting early issues of the title, as well as stories which originally appeared in Savage Tales. By 2016, the complete series had been reprinted in 22 volumes. In 2018 when Marvel resumed the rights it began publishing its own collected editions of original Marvel material. In 2022, Titan Comics acquired the license to reprint the magazine in new collected editions.

=== Marvel Omnibus Collected Editions ===
Title	Collects	Story	Art	Published	ISBN
Savage Sword Of Conan: The Original Marvel Years Omnibus Vol. 1	Savage Tales (1971) #1-5 Savage Sword Of Conan (1974) #1 - #12 Savage Sword Of Conan Special (1975) #1	Roy Thomas	Barry Windsor-Smith John Buscema	2019	ISBN 9781302915322
Savage Sword Of Conan: The Original Marvel Years Omnibus Vol. 2	Savage Sword Of Conan (1974) #13 - #28 Marvel Comics Super Special (1977) #2	Roy Thomas	John Buscema	2019	ISBN 9781302915162
Savage Sword Of Conan: The Original Marvel Years Omnibus Vol. 3	Savage Sword Of Conan (1974) #29 - #44 Marvel Comics Super Special (1977) #9	Roy Thomas	John Buscema Sal Buscema Ernie Chan	2020	ISBN 9781302922429
Savage Sword Of Conan: The Original Marvel Years Omnibus Vol. 4	Savage Sword Of Conan (1974) #45 - #60	Roy Thomas	John Buscema	2021	ISBN 9781302922443
Savage Sword Of Conan: The Original Marvel Years Omnibus Vol. 5	Savage Sword Of Conan (1974) #61 - #72	Michael Fleischer Roy Thomas Bruce Jones	John Buscema Gil Kane Ernie Chan	2021	ISBN 9781302926564
Savage Sword Of Conan: The Original Marvel Years Omnibus Vol. 6	Savage Sword Of Conan (1974) #73 - #87 Marvel Comics Super Special #21	Michael Fleischer Roy Thomas	John Buscema Alfredo Alcala Val Mayerik Gil Kane	2022	ISBN 9781302926946
Savage Sword Of Conan: The Original Marvel Years Omnibus Vol. 7	Savage Sword Of Conan (1974) #88 - #101	Michael Fleischer	John Buscema	2022	ISBN 9781302934309
Savage Sword Of Conan: The Original Marvel Years Omnibus Vol. 8	Savage Sword of Conan (1974) #102-116 Marvel Comics Super Special (1977) #35			2022	ISBN 978-1302934903

== Awards ==
The comic won the "Comic" British Fantasy Award in 1975 and 1976.

== See also ==
- Conan (comics)
- Conan (Marvel Comics)
