= The Conan Chronicles 2 =

Book by Robert E. Howard

- Cover of first edition
- Author: Robert E. Howard, L. Sprague de Camp and Lin Carter
- Cover artist: Blas Gallego
- Language: English
- Series: Conan the Barbarian
- Genre: Sword and sorcery
- Publisher: Orbit Books
- Publication date: 1990
- Publication place: United States
- Media type: Print (paperback)
- Pages: 250 pp
- ISBN: 0-7474-0690-1
- OCLC: 22629029
- Preceded by: The Conan Chronicles

The Conan Chronicles 2 is a 1990 omnibus collection of two previous fantasy collections and one fantasy novel by American writers Robert E. Howard, L. Sprague de Camp and Lin Carter, featuring Howard's sword and sorcery hero Conan the Barbarian, published by Orbit Books. The component books had originally been published by Lancer Books in 1966, 1968 and 1971, and later reissued by Ace Books. The omnibus collection was preceded by The Conan Chronicles.

== Contents ==
- Conan the Adventurer (Robert E. Howard and L. Sprague de Camp)

- "Introduction" (L. Sprague de Camp)
- "The People of the Black Circle" (Robert E. Howard)
- "The Slithering Shadow" (Robert E. Howard)
- "Drums of Tombalku" (Robert E. Howard and L. Sprague de Camp)
- "The Pool of the Black One" (Robert E. Howard)

- Conan the Wanderer (Robert E. Howard, L. Sprague de Camp and Lin Carter)

- "Introduction" (L. Sprague de Camp)
- "Black Tears" (L. Sprague de Camp and Lin Carter)
- "Shadows in Zamboula" (Robert E. Howard)
- "The Devil in Iron" (Robert E. Howard)
- "The Flame Knife" (Robert E. Howard and L. Sprague de Camp)

- Conan the Buccaneer (L. Sprague de Camp and Lin Carter)
