= The Frost-Giant's Daughter =

Conan short story by Robert E. Howard

- Short story by Robert E. Howard

Text available at Wikisource
- Original title: Gods of the North
- Country: US
- Language: English
- Genre: Fantasy

Publication
- Published in: US
- Publication date: 1953
- Series: Conan the Cimmerian

An interior panel of the Conan #2 (collected in The Frost-Giant's Daughter and Other Stories, Volume 1, 2005) comic adaptation by Kurt Busiek featuring the art of Cary Nord and Thomas Yeates.

"The Frost-Giant's Daughter" is one of the original fantasy short stories about Conan the Cimmerian, written by American author Robert E. Howard.

The story is set in the pseudo-historical Hyborian Age and details Conan pursuing a spectral nymph across the frozen tundra of Nordheim. Rejected as a Conan story by Weird Tales magazine editor Farnsworth Wright, Howard changed the main character's name to "Amra of Akbitana" and retitled the piece as "The Gods of the North", in which it was published in the March 1934 issue of The Fantasy Fan. It was not published in its original form in Howard's lifetime.

== Plot summary ==
A bloody hand-to-hand battle has occurred on an icy plain, where Wulfhere's Aesir "reavers" faced the Vanir "wolves" of Bragi, a Vanir chieftain. Eighty men ("four score") perished. Conan alone survives the battlefield, exhausted. He is visited by a beautiful and partially-nude woman identifying herself as "Atali". Upon her bodice, she wears a transparent veil: a wisp of gossamer that was not spun by human origin. The mere sight of her strange beauty awakens Conan's lust and, when she repeatedly taunts him, he insanely chases Atali for miles across the snow-covered region while attempting to capture her.

Mocking him with each step, Atali lures Conan into an ambush. Undaunted by the snare, Conan slays her hulking twin brothers, two Frost Giants, and captures Atali in his arms. However, Atali calls upon her father, Ymir, to save her. Before Conan is able to ravish her, Atali disappears in a stroke of lightning which seemingly transforms the landscape and renders him unconscious.

Later, when his Aesir comrades arrive, Conan believes he simply dreamed the bizarre encounter. Suddenly, Conan realizes he is still gripping a translucent veil which served as the sole garment of the Frost-Giant's daughter.

== Inspiration ==
While Robert E. Howard had already written many fantasy stories featuring northern Viking-like characters, the names and plot structure for "The Frost-Giant's Daughter" was derived in its entirety from Thomas Bulfinch's The Outline of Mythology (1913). Howard combined the legend of Atalanta with another reworked Bulfinch legend, that of Daphne and Apollo, but he reversed the roles. Whereas Apollo was a god and Daphne a mortal, Howard made Atali a goddess and Conan a mortal. In the original, Cupid had struck Apollo with an arrow to excite love for Daphne, but struck her with an arrow to cause her to find love repellent. Howard kept the idea of the love-maddened Apollo (rather a lust-maddened Conan) pursuing the girl until she invokes aid from her divine father.

== Publication history ==
The earlier version of the story was published in the collections The Coming of Conan (Gnome Press, 1953) and Conan of Cimmeria (Lancer Books, 1969). The last version, as left by Howard before his death, was first published in 1976 by Donald M. Grant in an edition of the Conan story Rogues in the House. This version of the tale has most recently been republished in the collections The Conan Chronicles Volume 1: The People of the Black Circle (Gollancz, 2000) and The Coming of Conan the Cimmerian (Del Rey, 2004).

"The Frost-Giant's Daughter" is the earliest chronological story by Robert E. Howard in terms of Conan's life. The brief tale is set somewhere in frozen Nordheim, geographically situated north of Conan's homeland, Cimmeria. Conan is depicted by Howard as an young warrior, traveling among the golden-haired Aesir in a war party.

The utilization of poetic descriptions throughout this tale is quite strong, and on par with Howard's "Queen of the Black Coast". However, the narrative is often criticized by Howard scholars for not having the more detailed plotting of his superior Conan stories such as "The Black Stranger". Largely, this is because Howard was aiming for a mythological feel, something to which the story is eminently suited.

This is the only Conan story in which other characters refer to him as "a southerner". In all the rest of his wanderings, Conan is invariably "a barbarian from the cold north", but for the Aesir and Vanir, Cimmeria is a southern land, less cold than theirs.

== Adaptations ==
The story has been adapted into comics:

- Savage Tales #1 (Marvel Comics, May 1971)
- Conan the Barbarian #16 (Marvel Comics, July 1972), a censored reprint of the Savage Tales story with a new opening page.
- Savage Sword of Conan #1 (Marvel Comics, Aug 1974), a reprint of the Savage Tales story with the opening page from Conan the Barbarian.
- Conan #2 (Dark Horse Comics, Mar 2004), and reprinted as Robert E Howard's The Frost-Giant's Daughter.
- The story was adapted into the prologue to the unproduced sequel King Conan: Crown of Iron written by screenwriter/director John Milius. In the screenplay, Conan encounters the Frost-Giant's Daughter and defeats her brothers, as in the original. However, in Milius' adaptation, he is not interrupted by Ymir and impregnates Atali, who then disappears in apparent fear of "The Ice Worm". She bears him a son, named Kon, whose parentage takes on much significance over the course of the story.
- The Cimmerian: The Frost-Giant's Daughter by Ablaze Comics, 2020. A three-issue miniseries focusing on Atali, and featuring a reprint of Howard's story in the back pages.
- Conan the Barbarian #15 (Titan Comics, October 2024), is a comics adaptation by Jim Zub, with issues #13, 14 and 16 serving as prequels and sequel, respectively, to the original story.

Preceded by "The Black Stranger"	Original Howard Canon (publication order)	Succeeded by "Cimmeria"
Preceded by none	Original Howard Canon (Dale Rippke chronology)	Succeeded by "The God in the Bowl"
Preceded by Conan the Valorous	Complete Conan Saga (William Galen Gray chronology)	Succeeded by "The Lair of the Ice Worm"
