= The Pool of the Black One (collection) =

1986 short story collection

- Dust-jacket from the first edition
- Author: Robert E. Howard
- Illustrator: Hank Jankus
- Cover artist: Hank Jankus
- Language: English
- Series: Donald M. Grant Conan
- Genre: Fantasy
- Publisher: Donald M. Grant, Publisher, Inc.
- Publication date: 1986
- Publication place: United States
- Media type: Print (hardback)
- Pages: 134 pp

The Pool of the Black One is a collection of two fantasy short stories written by Robert E. Howard featuring his sword and sorcery hero Conan the Barbarian. The book was published in 1986 by Donald M. Grant, Publisher, Inc. as volume X of their deluxe Conan set. The title story originally appeared in the magazine Weird Tales. "Drums of Tombalku" is the original fragment of a story that Howard never completed. It first appeared, completed by L. Sprague de Camp, in the collection Conan the Adventurer.

== Contents ==
- "The Pool of the Black One"
- "Drums of Tombalku"

Preceded by Black Colossus	Grant Conan series (publication order)	Succeeded by The Hour of the Dragon
