= The Tower of the Elephant =

1933 short story by Robert E. Howard

- Short story by Robert E. Howard
- An interior panel of "The Tower of the Elephant" comic adaptation by Roy Thomas featuring the art of John Buscema and Alfredo Alcala. The original short story was written by Robert E. Howard and first appeared in a 1933 issue of Weird Tales magazine.

Text available at Wikisource
- Original title: The Tower of the Elephant
- Country: United States
- Language: English
- Genre: Fantasy

Publication
- Published in: Weird Tales
- Publication type: Pulp
- Publisher: Rural Publishing Corporation
- Publication date: March 1933

Chronology
- Series: Conan the Cimmerian
The Scarlet Citadel	Black Colossus

"The Tower of the Elephant" is one of the original short stories starring the fictional sword and sorcery hero Conan the Cimmerian, written by American author Robert E. Howard. Set in the fictional Hyborian Age, it concerns Conan infiltrating a perilous tower to steal a fabled gem from an evil sorcerer named Yara. Its unique insights into the Hyborian world and atypical science fiction elements have led the story to be considered a classic of Conan lore, and it is often cited by Howard scholars as one of his best tales.

== Plot summary ==
In the Zamorian city of Arenjun, also known as the "City of Thieves,” Conan drinks in a tavern. He overhears a Kothic rogue describe a fabulous jewel known as the "Heart of the Elephant," which is kept in a tower by an evil sorcerer named Yara.

Conan ventures into Yara's garden to steal the jewel and encounters Taurus of Nemedia, known as the "Prince of Thieves,” who has the same agenda. Taurus is wily and fat, but amazingly agile. Impressed by Conan's daring, Taurus agrees to work together. After battling lions in the tower gardens, the thieves ascend Yara's spire. Upon reaching the top, Taurus enters a treasure vault and is killed by the venomous bite of a giant spider. Conan crushes the spider with a chest of gems, then continues his search for the Heart of the Elephant.

He discovers a strange being with the body of a man and the head of an elephant. The creature, Yag-kosha, is a blind and tortured prisoner of Yara.

Yag-kosha reveals to Conan the pre-cataclysmic saga of his people, their arrival on Earth, and how he taught Yara the art of magic only to have his apprentice betray him. At Yag-kosha's request, Conan grabs the fabled jewel, kills the being, extracts the heart from his corpse, and drips its blood over the Heart of the Elephant. When he sets the blood-infused relic in front of Yara in his sleeping-chamber, the gem's magic shrinks and draws the sorcerer into the jewel. Inside, a revived Yag-kosha, limbs and wings restored, pursues the screaming Yara, and the Heart vanishes.

Obeying Yag-kosha's instructions, Conan leaves, emerging empty-handed from the tower at dawn as it collapses behind him. He has nothing after his night's work except for his sword, loin-cloth, and sandals.

== Publication history ==
- Weird Tales magazine, March 1933
- Skull-Face and Others (Arkham House, 1946)
- The Coming of Conan (Gnome Press, 1953)
- Conan (Lancer, 1967, later reissued by Ace Books)
- The Tower of the Elephant (Donald M. Grant, Publisher, Inc., 1975)
- The Conan Chronicles (Sphere Books, 1989)
- The Conan Chronicles Volume 1: The People of the Black Circle (Gollancz, 2000)
- Conan of Cimmeria: Volume One (1932-1933) (Del Rey, 2003)
- Conan the Barbarian: the Stories that Inspired the Movie (Del Rey, 2011)

== Reception ==
In an overview of Howard's fiction, E. F. Bleiler listed "The Tower of the Elephant" as being "Among the better stories". Bleiler added that "the influence of the Lovecraft circle" can be seen in Howard's conception of the alien Yag-kosha.

== Adaptations ==
An adventure is based on this tale for Conan: The Roleplaying Game.

The Tower of the Elephant has been adapted into comic book form three times: twice by Marvel and once by Dark Horse.

The first adaptation by Marvel appeared in Conan the Barbarian #4. The story was adapted by Roy Thomas and illustrated by Barry Windsor-Smith and Sal Buscema.

The second adaptation by Marvel appeared in the Savage Sword of Conan #24 and was again written by Roy Thomas but this time drawn by John Buscema (brother of Sal Buscema) and Alfredo Alcala. Asked why he chose to adapt the same story again, Thomas explained: "I wanted to do all the adaptations [of Conan stories] I could, of everything. I adapted "The Tower of the Elephant" ... in sort of old-time radio format for a record album ... That was kind of nice. And then, right before I left Marvel, I adapted it near the end of the Conan comics strip. I adapted it about four times. I just, I like that story so much, I just wanted to wring everything out of it, and every time I could find a new excuse to adapt it, I would do it all over again."

The newest adaptation, in Dark Horse's Conan issues 20–22, was written by Kurt Busiek and illustrated by Cary Nord, Dave Stewart and Mike Kaluta. Two of these have recently appeared in collections released by Dark Horse: the Conan the Barbarian adaptation in The Conan Chronicles Volume 1: The Tower of the Elephant and other stories, and the Dark Horse adaptation in Conan Volume 3: The Tower of the Elephant and other stories.

Episode 3 of the animated series Conan the Adventurer is adapted from "Tower of the Elephant", although the character of Taurus is replaced with Jezmine who becomes an ongoing character in the series rather than dying.

A variant on this story has been added into the massively multiplayer online role-playing game Wizard101, a dungeon called the "Tower of the Helephant". The thief Taurus is the only name that remains true to the original tale, however the parallels between the stories are evident to anyone that is familiar with the story. The players must scale a tower and descend into it, ultimately freeing the elephant-headed interstellar being by defeating the wizard that bound him and destroying the "Heart of the Helephant".

The story is the inspiration for a sequence in the 1982 film Conan the Barbarian, which includes Conan and his fellow thieves scaling a tower, battling a giant snake, and stealing a jewel.

In the 2011 film Conan the Barbarian a character extols Conan's past accomplishments and mentions his adventure in the Tower of the Elephant.

The story was adapted into a hack and slash video game for IOS by developer Chillingo, which was released as a tie-in for the 2011 film Conan the Barbarian.

== Notes ==
Preceded by "The Scarlet Citadel"	Original Howard Canon (publication order)	Succeeded by "Black Colossus"
Preceded by "The God in the Bowl"	Original Howard Canon (Dale Rippke chronology)	Succeeded by "The Hall of the Dead"
Preceded by Conan the Formidable	Complete Conan Saga (William Galen Gray chronology)	Succeeded by Conan and the Sorcerer
