= Conan the Buccaneer =

Novel by Lin Carter

- Cover of first edition
- Authors: L. Sprague de Camp and Lin Carter
- Cover artist: Frank Frazetta
- Language: English
- Series: Conan the Barbarian
- Genre: Sword and sorcery
- Publisher: Lancer Books
- Publication date: 1971
- Publication place: United States
- Media type: Print (Paperback)
- Pages: 191

Conan the Buccaneer is a 1971 fantasy novel by American writers L. Sprague de Camp and Lin Carter featuring Robert E. Howard's sword and sorcery hero Conan the Barbarian. It was first published in paperback by Lancer Books, and has been reprinted a number of times since by various publishers. It has also been translated into German, Japanese, Spanish, Swedish, French and Dutch. It was later gathered together with Conan the Adventurer and Conan the Wanderer into the omnibus collection The Conan Chronicles 2 (1990).

== Plot summary ==
Conan, now in his late thirties and privateer captain of the Wastrel, becomes embroiled in the politics of the kingdom of Zingara when he searches for a mythical treasure on the Nameless Isle. Mixed up in his adventure are Princess Chabela, daughter of a dying Zingaran king, the privateer Zarono, and the Stygian sorcerer Thoth-Amon.

Chronologically, Conan the Buccaneer falls between "The Pool of the Black One" in Conan the Adventurer and "Red Nails" in Conan the Warrior. However, the present book ends with Conan as a successful captain, high in the favor of the royal family of Zingara, while "Red Nails" starts with him as a fugitive mercenary in the jungles south of Stygia. How Conan lost his ship, left the sea, and took up again the role of a mercenary is untold.

== Reception ==
Critic Don D'Ammassa writes "I'd bet a lot of money that this Conan adventure was largely written by Lin Carter. It reflects his style and preoccupations a great deal more than it does those of de Camp, and it lacks the latter's light touch with the prose. ... Reasonably good plot but substandard writing."

== Sources ==
- Laughlin, Charlotte; Daniel J. H. Levack (1983). De Camp: An L. Sprague de Camp Bibliography. San Francisco: Underwood/Miller. p. 40.

| Preceded by Conan the Adventurer | Lancer/Ace Conan series (chronological order) | Succeeded by Conan the Warrior |
| Preceded by "The Pool of the Black One" | Complete Conan Saga (William Galen Gray chronology) | Succeeded by "Red Nails" |
