= Conan the Wanderer =

Book by Robert E. Howard

- Cover of first edition
- Author: Robert E. Howard, L. Sprague de Camp and Lin Carter
- Cover artist: John Duillo
- Language: English
- Series: Conan the Barbarian
- Genre: Sword and sorcery
- Publisher: Lancer Books
- Publication date: 1968
- Publication place: United States
- Media type: Print (paperback)
- Pages: 222 pp

Conan the Wanderer is a 1968 collection of four fantasy short stories by American writers Robert E. Howard, L. Sprague de Camp and Lin Carter, featuring Howard's sword and sorcery hero Conan the Barbarian. Most of the stories were originally published in various fantasy magazines. The book has been reprinted a number of times since by various publishers, and has also been translated into German, Japanese, Spanish, Dutch, Swedish and Italian. It was later gathered together with Conan the Adventurer and Conan the Buccaneer into the omnibus collection The Conan Chronicles 2 (1990).

== Contents ==
- "Introduction" (L. Sprague de Camp)
- "Black Tears" (L. Sprague de Camp and Lin Carter)
- "Shadows in Zamboula" (Robert E. Howard)
- "The Devil in Iron" (Robert E. Howard)
- "The Flame Knife" (Robert E. Howard and L. Sprague de Camp)

== Plot summary ==
Conan, now about thirty-one, survives a Turanian-involved trap which crushes his Zuagir raiders and seeks revenge on Vardanes of Zamora, their betrayer. Afterwards, he moves on to other adventures, killing a high priest in the cannibal-haunted city of Zamboula and ultimately gaining command of a band of Kozaki warriors in the service of Kobad Shah, king of Iranistan. In his final adventure, Conan once again encounters his old rival, Olgerd Vladislav, and predecessor as chief of the Zuagirs.

Chronologically, the four short stories collected as Conan the Wanderer fall between Conan the Freebooter and Conan the Adventurer.

== Olgerd ==
Olgerd Vladislav first appeared in Howard's story "A Witch Shall be Born", collected in the previous Conan volume, Conan the Freebooter.

== Sources ==
- Laughlin, Charlotte; Daniel J. H. Levack (1983). De Camp: An L. Sprague de Camp Bibliography. San Francisco: Underwood/Miller. pp. 43–44.

Preceded by Conan the Freebooter	Lancer/Ace Conan series (chronological order)	Succeeded by Conan the Adventurer
