= Mike Docherty =

Scottish comic book artist (1955-2016)

- Born: September 11, 1955 Glasgow
- Died: January 19, 2016
- Area: Penciller
- Notable works: Conan the Barbarian

Michael Docherty (September 11, 1955 – January 19, 2016) was a Scottish comic book and animation artist living in California. He is best known for his work on Marvel Comics' 1980s and 1990s Conan comics.

Alan Grant scouted Scottish artists, including Docherty, for Marvel. Docherty drew concept designs and storyboards for animation, live-action TV and movie projects, but mainly focusing on animation. For over a decade, Docherty was one of the most prolific artists in the Conan Universe, with credits penciling Conan the Barbarian, Conan the King, and Savage Sword of Conan. He also illustrated the Conan graphic novels The Horn of Azoth and The Ravagers Out of Time. After penciling three issues of Conan the Savage in 1996, Docherty left Marvel for animation, where he worked as a storyboard artist on The Incredible Hulk, Godzilla: The Series and Captain Simian & The Space Monkeys.

== Bibliography ==
=== Marvel Comics ===
- Conan the Barbarian # 186, 248-252, 254-260, 263, 266-275 (1986-1993)
- Conan the King # 30-34, 40-49 (1985 -1988)
- Savage Sword of Conan # 108, 109, 118, 120, 123, 150, 155, 156, 159, 161, 166-169, 172, 178, 180, 181, 184, 189, 190, 196, 198, 218-235 (1985-1995)
- Conan: the Savage # 2, 3, 4 (1996)
- Conan: the Horn of Azoth (1990, graphic novel)
- Conan: The Ravagers Out of Time (1992, graphic novel)

=== Other ===
- Mars Attacks
- Specwar (Special Warfare) (2001, Peterfour Productions)
- Jungle Reign (graphic novels)
