= Black Colossus =

Fantasy novelette by Robert E. Howard

- Short story by Robert E. Howard
- Cover of Weird Tales, July 1933. Art by Margaret Brundage

Text available at Wikisource
- Country: United States
- Language: English
- Genre: Fantasy

Publication
- Published in: Weird Tales
- Publication type: Pulp magazine
- Publisher: Rural Publishing Corporation
- Publication date: July 1933

Chronology
- Series: Conan the Cimmerian
The Tower of the Elephant	The Slithering Shadow

"Black Colossus" is one of the original short stories starring the fictional sword and sorcery hero Conan the Cimmerian, written by American author Robert E. Howard and first published in Weird Tales magazine, June 1933. Howard earned $130 for the sale of this story.

Set during the fictional Hyborian Age, Conan leads the army of Khoraja against an evil sorcerer named Natohk, "The Veiled One".

This story formed part of the basis for the later Conan novel, The Hour of the Dragon.

== Plot overview ==
An ancient wizard named Thugra Khotan is awoken from his 3,000-year slumber by Shevatas, a Zamoran thief (he doesn't survive the experience). Soon, Thugra remembers his past dream of world domination. He assumes the alias of Natohk (The "Veiled One"), assembles an army of desert nomads, and begins his strategy of conquering the Hyborian nations. But the tiny kingdom of Khoraja – with a mixed Hyborian-Shemite population, culture, and religion – stands in his way. Khoraja is ruled by the beautiful Yasmela, sister of the king, who is now a prisoner in neighboring Ophir. Fearing Natohk's invasion, Yasmela seeks advice from the god of her ancestors, Mitra. Yasmela is told to travel into the streets and offer her kingdom's defenses to the first man she meets.

The first man she encounters is Conan the Cimmerian. Conan already has a position in Yasmela's army. Now, he is given full command over Khoraja's royal military, much to the confusion of his more cultured comrades. The arrogant officers now under Conan's command ridicule their new commander. However, they soon fall victim to Natohk's magic. Meanwhile, Natohk has made it clear conquering the world is not the only goal on his agenda; he also desires Queen Yasmela for himself.

Conan and his soldiers defeat Natohk's army, and the wizard devises a final attempt to capture Yasmela. Conan confronts him near the ruins of a Stygian temple.

== Themes ==
The story marks an important stage in the career of Conan. Due to the direct intervention of Mitra, Conan – who had never commanded more than a "company of cut-throats" – is given the opportunity to become a general and emerge victorious from an epic battle involving tens of thousands of soldiers while affecting the future of the whole world. Though Conan's career would know many more ups and downs, this was an important step towards him eventually becoming a king, which is foreshadowed in the story, and which Howard and his readers already knew since "The Phoenix on the Sword" was already published half a year earlier.

The expression: "A short life and a merry one", used by the character Amalric in Howard's story, is attributed to the Australian bushranger Steve Hart (1859 – 1880).

== Publication history ==
"Black Colossus" was first published in Weird Tales, June 1933.

A version of the story that was edited by L. Sprague de Camp was first published in the collection Conan the Barbarian (Gnome Press, 1954). It was republished in the collections Conan the Freebooter (Lancer Books, 1968; Sphere, 1974; Prestige, 1977; Ace, 1981) and The Conan Chronicles Volume 1 (Sphere, 1989).

The original version was first republished in Black Colossus (Grant, 1979). It has more recently been published in the collections The Conan Chronicles Volume 1: The People of the Black Circle (Gollancz, 2000), Conan of Cimmeria: Volume One (1932-1933) (Del Rey, 2003), The Weird Writings of Robert E. Howard Volume 1 (Girasol Collectables, 2006), The Complete Chronicles of Conan (Gollancz, 2006), Valley of the Worm (Wildside Press, 2006) and Three Tales of Conan the Barbarian (Echo Library, 2007).

== Adaptations ==
The story was adapted in comics form by Roy Thomas, John Buscema, and Alfredo Alcala in 1974, in the B&W Marvel Comics magazine Savage Sword of Conan #2. "Black Colossus" also forms the basis of part of Conan the Barbarian #248 and all of 249. (Conan serves as a mercenary captain for Khoraja, fighting rebels and Natohk's Stygian allies, in #246 and 247.)

The Savage Sword comics adaptation was reprinted in full color in the large sized Marvel Treasury Edition #15 in 1977.

In 2008, the Marvel adaptation was reprinted in black and white in the Savage Sword of Conan trade paperback published by Dark Horse.

In 2009, Timothy Truman and Tomas Giorello adapted the story in Dark Horse Comics' Conan the Cimmerian #8-13.

The story has also been adapted by publishing company Ablaze in their Cimmerian series of comics.

Preceded by "The Tower of the Elephant"	Original Howard Canon (publication order)	Succeeded by "The Slithering Shadow"
Preceded by "Shadows in the Moonlight"	Original Howard Canon (Dale Rippke chronology)	Succeeded by "Queen of the Black Coast"
Preceded by "Hawks over Shem"	Complete Conan Saga (William Galen Gray chronology)	Succeeded by "Shadows in the Dark"
