= Conan the Adventurer (short story collection) =

Book by Robert E. Howard

- Cover of first edition
- Author: Robert E. Howard and L. Sprague de Camp
- Cover artist: Frank Frazetta
- Language: English
- Series: Conan the Barbarian
- Genre: Sword and sorcery
- Publisher: Lancer Books
- Publication date: 1966
- Publication place: United States
- Media type: Print (paperback)
- Pages: 224 pp

Conan the Adventurer is a 1966 collection of four fantasy short stories by American writers Robert E. Howard and L. Sprague de Camp, featuring Howard's sword and sorcery hero Conan the Barbarian. Most of the stories originally appeared in the fantasy magazine Weird Tales in the 1930s. The book has been reprinted a number of times since by various publishers, and has also been translated into German, French, Japanese, Spanish, Italian, Swedish and Dutch. It was later gathered together with Conan the Wanderer and Conan the Buccaneer into the omnibus collection The Conan Chronicles 2 (1990).

== Contents ==
- "Introduction" (L. Sprague de Camp)
- "The People of the Black Circle" (Robert E. Howard)
- "The Slithering Shadow" (Robert E. Howard)
- "Drums of Tombalku" (Robert E. Howard and L. Sprague de Camp)
- "The Pool of the Black One" (Robert E. Howard)

== Plot summary ==
In these stories from Conan's early thirties, the Cimmerian starts as a leader of an Afghuli tribe in Vendhya, journeys into the Black Kingdoms south of Stygia, and ends up as a Zingaran buccaneer.

Chronologically, the four short stories collected as Conan the Adventurer fall between Conan the Wanderer and Conan the Buccaneer.

Preceded by Conan the Wanderer	Lancer/Ace Conan series (chronological order)	Succeeded by Conan the Buccaneer
