= The God in the Bowl =

Conan short story by Robert E. Howard

- Short story by Robert E. Howard
- Original title: The God in the Bowl
- Country: US
- Language: English
- Genre: Fantasy

Publication
- Published in: Space Science Fiction
- Publication type: Pulp magazine
- Publication date: 1952
- Series: Conan the Cimmerian

An illustration of a scene in The God in the Bowl as depicted by Mark Schultz in The Coming of Conan the Cimmerian (Del Rey, 2003).

"The God in the Bowl" is one of the original short stories featuring the sword and sorcery hero Conan the Cimmerian, written by American author Robert E. Howard but not published during his lifetime. Set during the fictional Hyborian Age, the plot sees Conan robbing a temple museum only to become the prime suspect in a murder mystery. The story first saw publication in September 1952 in Space Science Fiction and has been reprinted many times since.

== Plot summary ==
In the Nemedia city of Numalia, Conan enters a museum and antique house called the Temple of Kallian Publico.

While robbing the museum, the foreign barbarian Conan becomes embroiled in an unrelated murder investigation. The strangled corpse of the temple's owner and curator, Kallian Publico, is found by a night watchman. Though Conan is the prime suspect, the investigating magistrate, Demetrio, and the prefect of police, Dionus, are unwilling to immediately subdue him by force, as he threatens them with his sword.

As the investigation unfolds and others are called forward, the magistrate learns from Promero, Publico's clerk, that Publico had received from Stygia a bowl-shaped sarcophagus which now lies unsealed, open, and empty. This sarcophagus is a priceless relic found among the tombs beneath the Stygian pyramids and sent to a priest named Kalanthes. (Note: In the De Camp version called Caranthes) Intercepting this item meant for Kalanthes, Publico believes the sarcophagus contains the diadem of the giant-kings. But the object held something more insidious.

The magistrate and his men are baffled when uncovering this information. Conan slays a young aristocrat who orders his arrest and then wounds several of the encircling men. Suddenly, a scream of terror from the inner chamber causes the police and others to retreat, leaving Conan to fend for himself with the roaming murderer. Conan locates and decapitates the culprit, only to realize its identity afterwards: a giant serpent.

== Editing controversy ==
The original version was rejected by pulp magazine Weird Tales in Howard's lifetime and only rediscovered in 1951. It was then edited by L. Sprague de Camp for publication, and this edited version was the first version to see print. Several other differently-edited versions followed. The unedited, original version was only printed in 2002 with Conan of Cimmeria: Volume One (1932–1933).

Here is an example of the differences in texts. The first is by Howard, the second by de Camp:

Arus stood in a vast corridor, lighted by huge candles in nitches along the walls. These walls were hung with black velvet tapestries, and between the tapestries hung shields and crossed weapons of fantastic make.

The watchman stood in a vast corridor lighted by huge candles set in niches along the walls. Between the niches, these walls were covered with black velvet wall-hangings, and between the hangings hung shields and crossed weapons of fantastic make.

Purists decry De Camp's editorial work on both this and other Howard Conan stories. He reportedly substantially altered and rewrote whole sections, often to include references to his own work.

Everett F. Bleiler, commenting on the edited text, described "The God in the Bowl" as "a primitive detective story" and found it to be "not very good".

Carson Ward commented further: "A more fitting term would be an anti detective story – since it turns upside down the basic conventions of the genre. It begins in normal detective story fashion – a murder is discovered, the police arrives, a rationalist detective (Dionus) starts a thorough investigation, discards red herrings, and looks for the real culprit. But in total opposition to the conventional ending of a detective story – i.e, the detective solving the mystery and triumphantly apprehending the culprit – 'God in Bowl' ends with the forces of law and order totally routed, detective and constables fleeing the scene in panic. The stage is left to the clash of primeval forces, the barbarian from the north against the sinister magic from the south. The outcome is entirely due to Conan's sword-arm. The laws and criminal procedures of the surrounding city and kingdom are effectively nullified."

== Reprint history ==
Reprints of this story have appeared in the collections The Coming of Conan (Gnome Press, 1953), Conan (Lancer Books, 1967), and The Tower of the Elephant (Grant, 1975). It was later republished in the collections The Conan Chronicles Volume 1: The People of the Black Circle (Gollancz, 2000) and Conan of Cimmeria: Volume One (1932–1933) (Del Rey, 2003).

== Ibis ==
The story introduces the god Ibis and his priest, Kalanthes of Hanumar, but little is told of them besides the fact the Stygian sorcerer Thoth-amon disliked the priest enough to spend considerable effort to try to kill him. Howard never made much more of Ibis in the rest of the canonical Conan stories, leaving him an obscure feature of the Hyborian age. Some writers of future Conan stories give Ibis a more prominent role. In particular, the plot of Sean A. Moore's Conan and the Grim Grey God takes up in detail thousands of years' of the history of Ibis and his priesthood, and their hereditary conflict with the Stygian priests and gods.

== Adaptations ==
Roy Thomas and Barry Smith adapt the story in Marvel Comics' Conan the Barbarian #7 ("The Lurker Within", July 1971). Some alterations from the original text are made, including that Aztrias, the aristocrat who hires and betrays Conan, is a woman and is killed by the serpent rather than by Conan. Kurt Busiek and Cary Nord also adapt the story in Dark Horse Comics' Conan #10 & 11.

== Notes ==
Preceded by "The Hyborian Age"	Original Howard Canon (publication order)	Succeeded by "The Black Stranger"
Preceded by "The Frost-Giant's Daughter"	Original Howard Canon (Dale Rippke chronology)	Succeeded by "The Tower of the Elephant"
Preceded by Conan the Fearless	Complete Conan Saga (William Galen Gray chronology)	Succeeded by Conan the Warlord
