= The Conan Chronicles, 1 =

2000 collection of short stories written by Robert E. Howard

The Conan Chronicles: Volume 1: The People of the Black Circle
- Cover of the first edition
- Author: Robert E. Howard
- Cover artist: John Howe
- Language: English
- Series: Gollancz Conan Chronicles
- Genre: Fantasy
- Publisher: Gollancz
- Publication date: 2000
- Publication place: United Kingdom
- Media type: Print (paperback)
- Pages: xii, 548 pp
- ISBN: 1-85798-996-1
- OCLC: 59568599
- Followed by: The Conan Chronicles, Volume 2: The Hour of the Dragon

The Conan Chronicles: Volume 1: The People of the Black Circle is a collection of fantasy short stories written by Robert E. Howard featuring his sword and sorcery hero Conan the Barbarian. The book was published in 2000 by Gollancz as eighth volume of their Fantasy Masterworks series. The book, edited by Stephen Jones, presents the stories in their internal chronological order. Most of the stories originally appeared in the magazines The Phantagraph, Weird Tales, Super-Science Fiction, Magazine of Horror and Fantasy Fiction.

== Contents ==
- Map of the Hyborian Age, by Dave Senior
- "The Hyborian Age"
- "The Tower of the Elephant"
- "The Hall of the Dead" (synopsis)
- "The God in the Bowl"
- "Rogues in the House"
- "The Hand of Nergal" (fragment)
- "The Frost-Giant's Daughter"
- "Queen of the Black Coast"
- "The Vale of Lost Women"
- "The Snout in the Dark" (draft)
- "Black Colossus"
- "Shadows in the Moonlight"
- "A Witch Shall Be Born"
- "Shadows in Zamboula"
- "The Devil in Iron"
- "The People of the Black Circle"
- "The Slithering Shadow"
- "Drums of Tombalku" (draft)
- "The Pool of the Black One"
- Robert E. Howard and Conan: The Early Years, by Stephen Jones
