= Rogues in the House =

Conan novelette by Robert E. Howard

- Short story by Robert E. Howard

Text available at Wikisource
- Country: United States
- Language: English
- Genre: Fantasy

Publication
- Published in: Weird Tales
- Publication type: Pulp magazine
- Publisher: Rural Publishing Corporation
- Publication date: January 1934

Chronology
- Series: Conan the Cimmerian
The Pool of the Black One	Shadows in the Moonlight

"Rogues in the House" is one of the original short stories starring the fictional sword and sorcery hero Conan the Cimmerian, written by American author Robert E. Howard and first published in Weird Tales magazine in January 1934. It is set in the fictional Hyborian Age and concerns Conan inadvertently becoming involved in the struggle between two powerful men fighting for control of a city-state. It was the seventh Conan story Howard had published. It features a fight between Conan and an intelligent ape-like hominid.

== Plot summary ==
The story begins in an unnamed city-state between Zamora and Corinthia during a power struggle between two powerful leaders: Murilo, an aristocrat, and Nabonidus the "Red Priest", a clergyman with a strong power base. After he is delivered a threat by Nabonidus (the ear of a corrupt secretary that worked with Murilo), Murilo learns of Conan's reputation as a mercenary and turns to him for help.

Prior to the story's beginning, Conan kills a corrupt priest of Anu, who was both a fence and police informer. However, Conan was arrested after he became intoxicated and a prostitute turned him in. Languishing in a jail cell while awaiting his execution, Conan receives Murilo's visit and is proposed a bargain: in exchange for setting him free and getting him out of Corinthia with a bag of gold, Conan will assassinate Nabonidus.

After accepting his offer, Conan is given food and wine by Murilo. However, while he's eating, the jailer who should release Conan when Murilo has left (thus with an alibi) is arrested on unrelated corruption charges (corruption seems to run rampant in the city). Soon, his replacement is flabbergasted to see a prisoner awaiting execution while chomping down on a slice of beef. As he's entering the cell to confiscate it, Conan splits the man's skull with the very bone he was gnawing on and makes his escape. He briefly considers leaving Murilo on his own, but then decides to follow the original plan and keep his word.

After taking revenge on the prostitute who turned him in (he slays her new lover and throws the woman into a foul cesspit), Conan sneaks into Nabonidus's trap-filled mansion. However, he finds that Murilo and Nabonidus himself are being held captive by a mysterious third party who took control of Nabonidus's position while impersonating him. This turns out to be Thak, a primitive ape-like creature who Nabonidus had captured as a cub and trained as his personal bodyguard. The three observe Thak, via a series of hidden periscopes, and see that the creature has learned to imitate Nabonidus well enough to activate a toxic pollen trap, which eliminates yet another party of assassins (nationalistic agitators) penetrating the villa.

Finally, Conan and the other two men manage to escape from the basement and regain entry into Nabonidus's mansion. Later, Conan defeats Thak in hand-to-hand combat. The Red Priest soon betrays both Conan and Murilo; but, while Nabonidus is gloating over his plans in a villain monologue, Conan slays him with an expertly hurled stool. The surviving pair leave and go their separate ways.

== Reception ==
In a January 1934 letter to H. P. Lovecraft, Clark Ashton Smith (discussing the January 1934 issue of Weird Tales) praised "Rogues in the House". Smith stated, "Conan, as usual, put on a very entertaining and imaginative show."

== Publication history ==
- Weird Tales magazine (Jan 1934)
- Terror by Night anthology (Selwyn and Blount, 1934, ed. Christine Campbell Thomson)
- Skull-Face and Others (Arkham House, 1946)
- The Coming of Conan (Gnome Press, 1953)
- More Not at Night anthology (Arrow Books, 1961, ed. Christine Campbell Thomson)
- Conan (Lancer, 1967, later reissued by Ace Books)
- Rogues in the House (Donald M. Grant, Publisher, Inc., 1976)
- The Conan Chronicles (Sphere Books, 1989)
- The Conan Chronicles, Volume 1: The People of the Black Circle (Gollancz, 2000)
- Conan of Cimmeria: Volume One (1932-1933) (Del Rey, 2003).

== Comic book adaptation ==
The story was adapted by Roy Thomas and Barry Smith in Marvel Comics' Conan the Barbarian #11 (Nov 1971), and by Tim Truman and Cary Nord and Tomás Giorello in Dark Horse Comics' Conan #41–44 (2007).

Preceded by "The Pool of the Black One"	Original Howard Canon (publication order)	Succeeded by "Shadows in the Moonlight"
Preceded by "The Hall of the Dead"	Original Howard Canon (Dale Rippke chronology)	Succeeded by "The Hand of Nergal"
Preceded by Conan the Warlord	Complete Conan Saga (William Galen Gray chronology)	Succeeded by Conan the Victorious
