= The Conan Saga =

The Conan Saga was an American sword and sorcery comic book title featuring the character Conan the Barbarian, published by Marvel Comics from 1987 to 1995.

== Publication history ==
Conan Saga was published by Marvel Comics from May 1987 until April 1995, for a total of 97 issues. It included all reprints from Savage Sword of Conan and Conan the Barbarian in large, black and white Savage Sword of Conan magazine format. Barry Windsor-Smith provided new painted covers for the first nine issues the title, all of which contained black-and-white reprints of his original 1970s Conan stories.

Solomon Kane appeared in The Conan Saga #50 (May 1991) with a previously unpublished story by Alan Rowlands, with art by Steve Carr and Al Williamson.

The Official Handbook of the Conan Universe in 1993 was reprinted in black and white (with a different cover and a cover-inside-poster) and then released in June in a polybagged issue with Conan Saga #75.

The 2009 Dark Horse Comics collection entitled The Saga of Solomon Kane - Soft Cover collection includes various stories from Conan Saga.

Conan Saga #97 was reprinted in the collection The Savage Sword of Kull Volume 2 in 2011.

The 2021 Marvel Omnibus collection "Kull: Savage Sword – The Original Marvel Years" included material from Conan Saga #13, 25, 47, 57, 97.
