= Drums of Tombalku =

Unfinished Conan story fragment by Robert E. Howard

- Short story by Robert E. Howard
- Original title: Drums of Tombalku
- Country: USA
- Language: English
- Genre: Fantasy

Publication
- Published in: Conan the Adventurer
- Publication type: Short story collection
- Publisher: Lancer Books
- Publication date: 1966
- Series: Conan the Cimmerian

"Drums of Tombalku" is an American fantasy short story, one of the original ones written in the 1930s by Robert E. Howard featuring Conan the Cimmerian. Howard left it as an untitled synopsis which was not published in his lifetime. The tale was finalized by L. Sprague de Camp and in this form first published in the collection Conan the Adventurer (1966). It has first been published in its original form in the collection The Pool of the Black One (Donald M. Grant, 1986) and later in The Conan Chronicles Volume 1: The People of the Black Circle (Gollancz, 2000) and Conan of Cimmeria: Volume Two (1934) (Del Rey, 2005).

== Adaptation ==
The story was adapted in the comic book Savage Sword of Conan #21, under the title "The Horror from the Red Tower".

== Synopsis ==
A nobleman, Amalric, arrives at a desert oasis with his two companions from a bandit tribe, Gobir and Saidu. A third member of the tribe, a giant named Tilutan, arrives with an unconscious girl slumped across his shoulders. As he is trying to revive her, both Gobir and Saidu argue on who will rape her after Tilutan. Amalric feigns indifference towards their decision and tells them to gamble for it. As they are betting over a game of dice, Amalric kills Gobir and, in the ensuing struggle, kills the other two as well before passing out from exhaustion.

He awakens to find the girl splashing water on him, learning that her name is Lissa and she's far more beautiful than he had previously thought. Upon seeing her innocence, Amalric decides not to rape her, as had been the plan after killing his three companions. Lissia tells him that she is from a city called Gazal, which she ran away from before falling unconscious due to dehydration. The two set off towards the city, arriving at dawn to a series of sandstone ruins. The only structure left standing is a single tower, which Lissa is terrified of. There are people in the city, daydreamers and poets of a dwindling race, who are never harassed by marauding tribesmen because of their worship of whatever lurks within the tower.

Amalric and Lissa spend the night together, talking about their lives. Amalric explains he was originally part of a military expedition into the surrounding region, before being betrayed and having his unit wiped out. Fortunately, he managed to escape with Conan, who was seemingly cut down during an attack. Suddenly, both hear an awful cry from near the ruins, and Lissa, frightened, tells Amalric about a supernatural monster that lives in the tower, which leaves occasionally to devour one of the city’s inhabitants. Amalric believes that the citizens have fallen under some sort of spell and they should leave immediately. While saddling his horse, Amalric hears Lissa's scream, and rushes back into their room to find her gone.

He rushes towards the tower, believing Lissa was captured by the creature, and encounters a man of strange beauty in one of the upper chambers. Not fooled, he casts a spell to hold the demon in its human form, and, after a great battle, stabs the creature through the heart, killing it. With its dying breath, the demon screams for vengeance as disembodied voices answer it. At the bottom of a stairway, Amalric is reunited with Lissa, who wasn't killed but fled after seeing the creature dragging one its victims away. They hastened out of the city, chased across the desert by seven inhuman riders wearing dark robes. Finding no water, their horses began to falter around dusk, as the pursuers gain ground. Finally, Lissa’s mount stumbles from exhaustion. Just as the riders are about to fall upon them, they're both swept away by a band of horsemen

The leader of the horsemen turns out to be Conan, who had been captured by the men who were now his companions. These men were from Tombalku, and had brought Conan to their kings, who had condemned him to die of torture. However, one of the kings recognized Conan, had him released, and raised to a high position in the army. He explains the political make up of Tombalku to Almaric as they ride towards the city. On arrival they find tensions in the city boiling over, and a bloody civil war ensues. Conan and his allies win, their enemies either killed or sent into exile in the desert, and he takes the throne beside the king who had saved him. However, a priest accuses Almaric of killing their god and demands for him, along with Lissa, be tortured to death. Conan refuses and chaos erupts. Conan, Almaric, and Lissa manage to escape as the exiled tribes attack the city, with Tombalku collapsing into fire and bloodshed.

Preceded by "Cimmeria"	Original Howard Canon (publication order)	Succeeded by "The Hall of the Dead"
Preceded by "Shadows in Zamboula"	Original Howard Canon (Dale Rippke chronology)	Succeeded by "The Vale of Lost Women"
Preceded by "The Slithering Shadow"	Complete Conan Saga (William Galen Gray chronology)	Succeeded by "The Gem in the Tower"
