= Shadows in Zamboula =

- Short story by Robert E. Howard
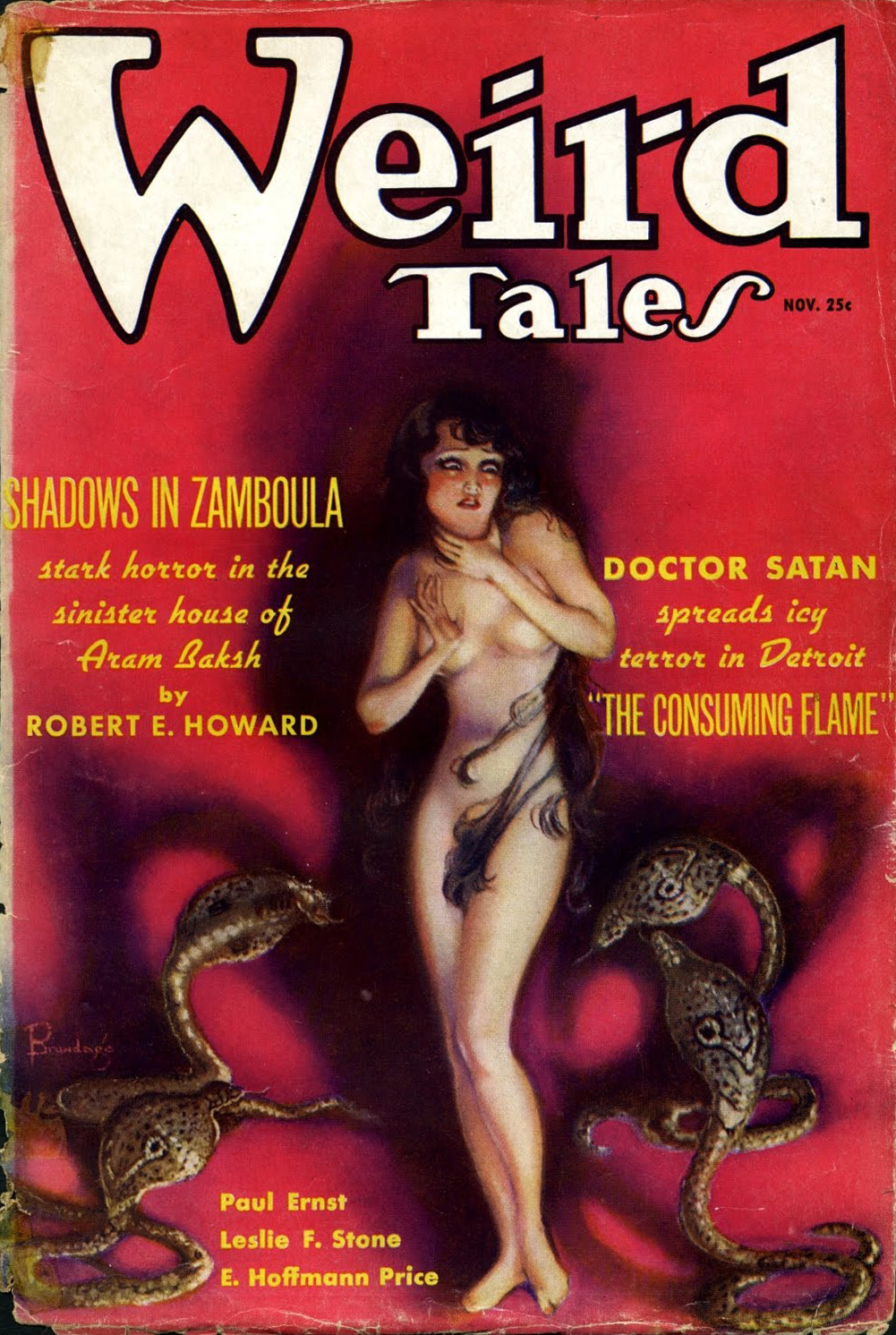
- Cover of Weird Tales, November 1935. Art by Margaret Brundage
- Original title: The Man-Eaters of Zamboula
- Country: United States
- Language: English
- Genre: Fantasy

Publication
- Published in: Weird Tales
- Publication type: Pulp magazine
- Publisher: Rural Publishing
- Publication date: November, 1935

Chronology
- Series: Conan the Cimmerian
Beyond the Black River	The Hour of the Dragon

"Shadows in Zamboula" is one of the original stories by American writer Robert E. Howard featuring Conan the Cimmerian, first published in Weird Tales in November 1935. Its original title was "The Man-Eaters of Zamboula".

The story takes place over the course of a night in the desert city of Zamboula, with political intrigue amidst streets filled with roaming cannibals. This story also introduced a fearsome strangler named Baal-Pteor, who is one of the few humans in the Conan stories to be a physical challenge for the main character himself.

By present-day sensibilities, the story is marred by including a racial stereotype - blacks as cannibals - though Howard strove to lessen this by making it clear that the cannibals in Zamboula are only the specific blacks from Darfar, other blacks being untainted. A white character, Aram Baksh, proves to be a more sinister antagonist by facilitating, exploiting, and profiting from the cannibalism of the Dafari slaves.

== Plot summary ==
Despite the warning he received in a suq by an elderly nomad, Conan spends the night at a cheap tavern in Zamboula, owned by Aram Baksh. As night falls, a black cannibal from Dafar enters his chamber, by means of a trick lock, to drag Conan away and feast on him. All of the Darfarian slaves in the city are cannibals who roam the streets at night. Since the cannibals only prey on travelers, the inhabitants of the city tolerate this and stay locked securely in their homes, while nomads and beggars make sure to spend the night at a comfortable distance from Zamboula. Even worse, Aram Baksh has made a deal with the cannibals - he provides them with "fresh meat" and profits from the belongings of his ill-fated guests at the inn.

This night, however, the unfortunate cannibal attempts to prey on a fully aware Conan and pays with his life. Realizing his room is actually a trap, Conan escapes into the Zamboulan streets where he encounters a naked woman being attacked by the roaming cannibals. Conan rescues her, and the woman tells him how she tried to secure her fiancé's affection with a love potion, which instead made a raving lunatic of him, and he chased her out of their home. After promising Conan "a reward" for his assistance, the two capture the mad lover, and then attempt to murder the high priest responsible for the lover's insanity.

The woman is captured in their attempt, and forced - via hypnotism - to dance before the high priest until she is exhausted. Conan, after defeating a strangler named Baal-Pteor at his own game, rescues the woman and kills the corrupt priest. Right before Conan could claim his payment, the woman reveals herself as Nafertari, mistress of the satrap of Zamboula, Jungir Khan (the insane lover). Taking the antidote to Jungir, Nafertari promises Conan a position in her council and vast wealth.

Conan, however, leaves the city and reveals to the reader how he had recognized the two almost immediately. He takes his revenge on Aram Baksh by cutting out Baksh's tongue and slicing off his beard, rendering him both mute and unrecognizable, then turns Baksh over to the hungry cannibals so they can devour him (one of the most profound displays of Conan's ironic sense of humor). Afterward, Conan leaves the city with a bag of gold and a magic ring which started the night's intrigues (Conan had stolen it from the insane Jungir during their first encounter), with the intent of selling his prize to another interested party.

== Reprint history ==
The story was republished in the collections Conan the Barbarian (Gnome Press, 1954), Conan the Wanderer (Lancer Books, 1968), and The Devil in Iron (Grant, 1976). It has more recently been published in the collections The Conan Chronicles Volume 1: The People of the Black Circle (Gollancz, 2000) as "Shadows in Zamboula" and in Conan of Cimmeria: Volume Three (1935–1936) (Del Rey, 2005) under its original title, "The Man-Eaters of Zamboula." The story was also published in Karl Edward Wagner's Berkley Medallion Editions (Red nails, People of the Black Circle and Hour of the Dragon), published by Berkley Books in 1977. The story is also found in 'The Essential Conan' published in 1998 by the Science Fiction Book Club. This collection contains the Conan stories as edited back to their original form by Karl Edward Wagner in 1977 Berkley editions.

== Adaptation ==
The story was adapted by Roy Thomas and Neal Adams in Savage Sword of Conan #14. The story has also been adapted by publishing company Ablaze in their "Cimmerian" series of comics.

Preceded by "Beyond the Black River"	Original Howard Canon (publication order)	Succeeded by The Hour of the Dragon
Preceded by "The People of the Black Circle"	Original Howard Canon (Dale Rippke chronology)	Succeeded by "Drums of Tombalku"
Preceded by Conan and the Manhunters	Complete Conan Saga (William Galen Gray chronology)	Succeeded by Conan the Raider
