= The Devil in Iron =

Conan novelette by Robert E. Howard

- Short story by Robert E. Howard
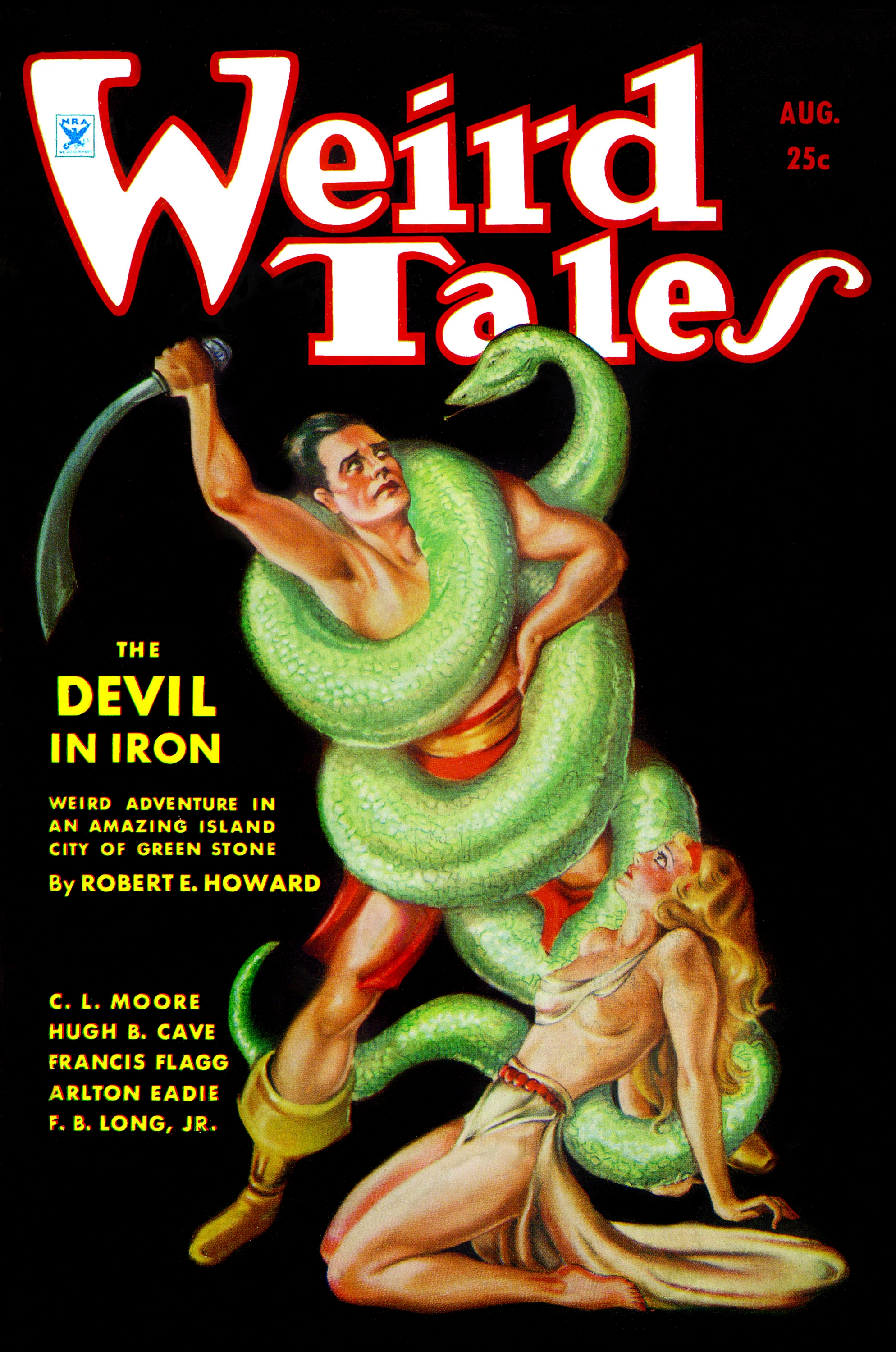
- Cover for Weird Tales, August 1934. Art by Margaret Brundage

Text available at Wikisource
- Country: United States
- Language: English
- Genre: Fantasy

Publication
- Published in: Weird Tales
- Publication type: Pulp magazine
- Publisher: Rural Publishing Corporation
- Publication date: August 1934

Chronology
- Series: Conan the Cimmerian
Queen of the Black Coast	The People of the Black Circle

"The Devil in Iron" is one of the original stories by American writer Robert E. Howard about sword and sorcery hero Conan the Cimmerian, first published in Weird Tales in August 1934. Howard earned $115 for the publication of this story.The Devil in Iron The plot concerns the resurrection of a mythical demon, the theft of a sacred dagger, and an unrelated trap that lures Conan to the island fortress roamed by the demon. The story's plot loopholes and borrowed elements from "Iron Shadows in the Moon" lead some Howard scholars to call this story the weakest of the early Conan tales.

== Plot summary ==
The actions of a greedy fisherman awaken an ancient demon, Khosatral Khel, on the remote island of Xapur. Khel resurrects his fortress which once dominated the island, including its cyclopean walls, gigantic pythons, and undead citizens.

Meanwhile, an evil governor from Turan, Jehungir Agha, tricks Conan into pursuing Princess Octavia to the island of Xapur. Jehungir Agha plans for Conan to fall into a prepared trap on the island. The unforeseen resurrection of Khel and his ancient fortress interrupts Agha's original plan.

When Conan arrives on Xapur, he battles not only the mercenaries employed by Jehungir Agha, but also a giant serpent and the iron-fleshed Khosatral Khel.

== Publication history ==
Weird Tales first published "The Devil in Iron'" in the August 1934 issue. The story was republished in the collections Conan the Barbarian (Gnome Press, 1954), Conan the Wanderer (Lancer Books, 1968), and The Devil in Iron (Grant, 1976). It has more recently been published in the collections The Conan Chronicles Volume 1: The People of the Black Circle (Gollancz, 2000) and Conan of Cimmeria: Volume One (1932–1933) (Del Rey, 2003).

== Adaptation ==
Roy Thomas, John Buscema and Alfredo Alcala adapted this story in Savage Sword of Conan #15. The Dark Horse Comics series Conan the Slayer adapted the story in issues #8–11.

Preceded by "Queen of the Black Coast"	Original Howard Canon (publication order)	Succeeded by "The People of the Black Circle"
Preceded by "A Witch Shall be Born"	Original Howard Canon (Dale Rippke chronology)	Succeeded by "The People of the Black Circle"
Preceded by Conan and the Amazon	Complete Conan Saga (William Galen Gray chronology)	Succeeded by "The Flame Knife"
