= The Pool of the Black One =

1933 short story by Robert E. Howard

- Short story by Robert E. Howard
- The opening panel of the comic adaptation of The Pool of the Black One by Roy Thomas featuring the art of John Buscema and Sonny Trinidad. The original short story was written by Robert E. Howard and first appeared in a 1933 issue of Weird Tales magazine.

Text available at Wikisource
- Country: United States
- Language: English
- Genre: Fantasy

Publication
- Published in: Weird Tales
- Publication type: Pulp magazine
- Publication date: October 1933

Chronology
- Series: Conan the Cimmerian
The Slithering Shadow	Rogues in the House

"The Pool of the Black One" is one of the original short stories starring the sword and sorcery hero Conan the Cimmerian, written by American author Robert E. Howard. It was first published in Weird Tales in October 1933. It's set in the fictional Hyborian Age, and concerns Conan becoming the captain of a pirate vessel while encountering a remote island with a mysterious pool which has the power of transmutation.

== Plot summary ==
"The Pool of the Black One", which appeared in Weird Tales magazine a month after "The Slithering Shadow", is a pirate-themed adventure story and occurs in the Western Sea of the Hyborian Age. The story begins with Conan adrift at sea, after escaping from rival pirates in the Barachan Isles. He climbs aboard the Wastrel, a ship belonging to a different pirate order who are bitter rivals of the Barachan ones. After a tense conversation with the captain and his brawl with a Zingaran bully, Conan is begrudgingly accepted as a lowly member of the crew and is allowed to remain on board.

The vessel sails towards an uncharted island, where the captain hopes to find a legendary treasure and, perhaps, much more. All hands go ashore, including the tyrannical captain and his mistress Sancha. The island seems deceptively inviting, as the crewmembers gorge themselves on sweet fruit - which causes them to fall asleep. While on the island, Conan confronts his captain alone in the jungle and slays him in a vicious duel. However, the mysterious kidnapping of a crew member convinces Conan to travel deeper into the jungle. The island is revealed to be inhabited by a tribe of tall black humanoids (not black as in kushite or zembabweian, but rather jet black with strange golden-glowing eyes and clawed hands) who capture the crew, force one of the pirates into performing an ancient ritual (which involves having him dance and cavort wildly to the tune of a bizarre flute-like instrument with the power to "lay bare the most secret lusts and passions of one's soul"), and proceed to dunk some of Conan's crewmembers in the eponymous pool, which transformed the men into shrunken figures. Thousands of such figures placed across shelves at the side of the pool indicate that the humanoids have been doing this for countless years, and this accounts for many ships which sailed into the west and never returned.

Conan rescues the remaining captives, including Sancha, and rallies them to fight against the black humanoids. After a brutal fight, Conan slays the leader of the black humanoids who, before falling dead, utters an ancient formula (the only words ever spoken by the taciturn beings) which triggers a self-destruct device inside the pool. Its sickly and verdant fluids erupt upwards like a geyser and, seemingly broke free of some mystical yoke, proceeds to chase after the surviving pirates, who all scamper wildly towards the Wastrel. Fortunately, the crew manages to raise anchor and set sail literally seconds before the snake-like mass of fluid could touch their ship's hull.

Conan warns his crew about the powers of the greenish fluid, leading the way during their rush for the ship and jumping at the helm as soon as the Wastrel departs. Bloodied by their battle against the Black Ones and shocked by these supernatural events, the surviving crew readily accept Conan as their new leader. Soon, Conan asserts his authority as captain and claims Sancha as his prize. The story concludes with the Cimmerian dreaming of raiding seaports and of the future plunder he will acquire.

== Publication history ==
First published in Weird Tales in October 1933, the story was republished in the collections The Sword of Conan (Gnome Press, 1952), Conan the Adventurer (Lancer Books, 1966), and The Pool of the Black One (Grant, 1986). It has more recently been published in the collections The Conan Chronicles Volume 1: The People of the Black Circle (2000) and Conan of Cimmeria: Volume One (1932-1933) (Del Rey, 2003).

== Reception ==
Clark Ashton Smith, in a letter to H. P. Lovecraft dated October 1933, praised the story. Smith wrote "Howard has some fine romantic fantasy in "The Pool of the Black Ones" [sic]".

== Adaptation ==
The story was adapted by Roy Thomas, John Buscema and Sonny Trinidad in Savage Sword of Conan #22 & 23 (Sept–Oct. 1977).

Preceded by "The Slithering Shadow"	Original Howard Canon (publication order)	Succeeded by "Rogues in the House"
Preceded by "The Vale of Lost Women"	Original Howard Canon (Dale Rippke chronology)	Succeeded by "Beyond the Black River"
Preceded by Conan and the Grim Grey God	Complete Conan Saga (William Galen Gray chronology)	Succeeded by Conan the Buccaneer
