= Shadows in the Moonlight (short story) =

Conan novelette by Robert E. Howard

- Short story by Robert E. Howard
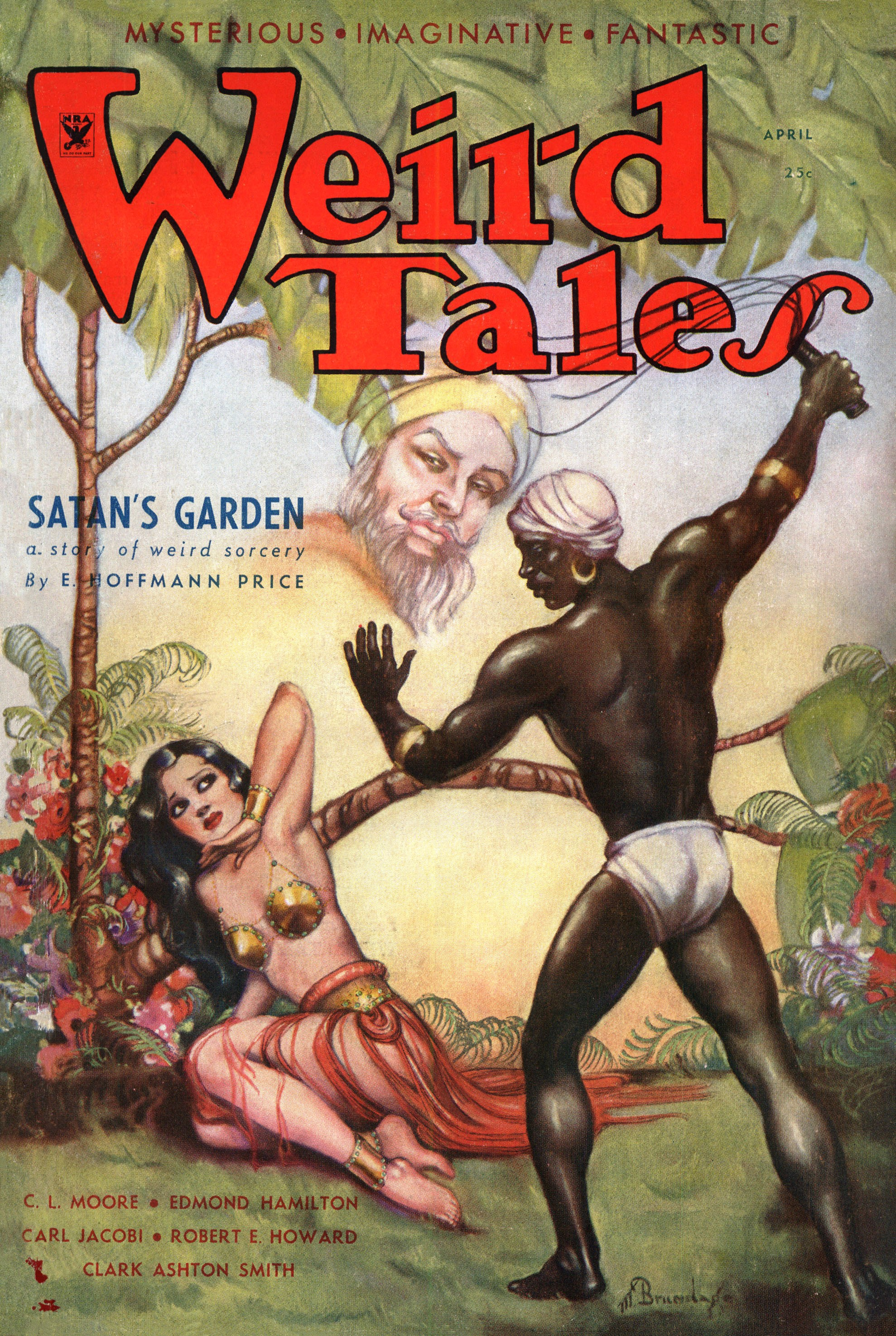
- Cover of Weird Tales, April 1934. Art by Margaret Brundage

Text available at Wikisource
- Original title: Iron Shadows in the Moon
- Country: United States
- Language: English
- Genre: Fantasy

Publication
- Published in: Weird Tales
- Publication type: Pulp magazine
- Publisher: Rural Publishing Corporation
- Publication date: April 1934

Chronology
- Series: Conan the Cimmerian
Rogues in the House	Queen of the Black Coast

"Shadows in the Moonlight" is one of the original short stories starring the fictional sword and sorcery hero Conan the Cimmerian, written by American author Robert E. Howard and first published in Weird Tales magazine in April 1934. Howard had originally named his story "Iron Shadows in the Moon". It is set in the fictional Hyborian Age and narrates Conan's escape to a remote island in the Vilayet Sea where he encounters the Red Brotherhood, a skulking creature, and mysterious iron statues.

== Plot summary ==
Olivia, having fled from her captivity in the city of Akif, is finally cornered near a marsh on the edge of the Vilayet Sea. Olivia's pursuer and former master is a sadistic rogue named Shah Amurath. Suddenly, before Amurath can lay his hands on Olivia, a figure rises from the reeds. The newcomer has witnessed all his friends betrayed and treacherously cut down to a man before escaping into the marshes. There, he has hidden out for so long he is nearly mad. The newcomer quickly kills Amurath, and he and Olivia climb aboard a boat while deciding to lie low for a while. Only then does the stranger identify himself: Conan the Cimmerian.

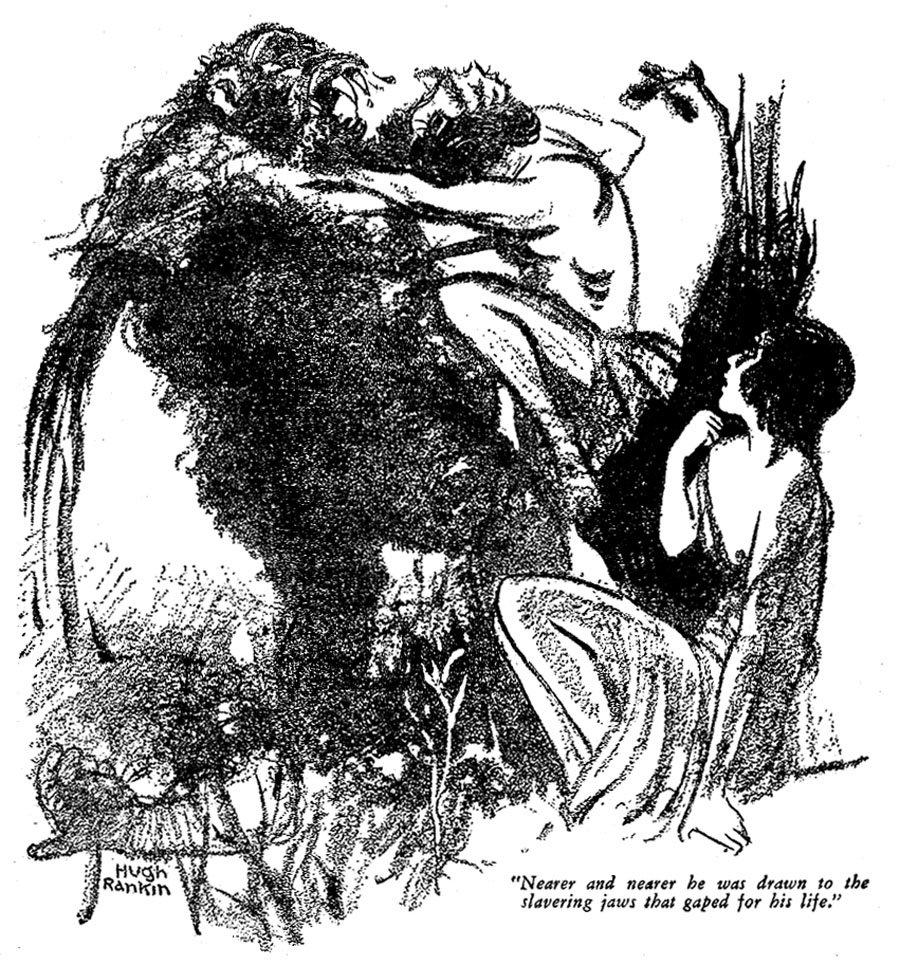
Illustration for "Shadows in the Moonlight" on p. 467 of Weird Tales by Hugh Doak Rankin, April 1934

Conan rows towards a dark and apparently deserted island, where they spend the night sleeping near ancient ruins decorated with remarkably lifelike statues. Olivia has a bizarre dream where she witnesses a race of dark-skinned humanoids being transformed into statues by a vengeful god, and is convinced they will come to life in the moonlight. Conan is less than convinced by Olivia's fears; he's more concerned by whatever it is lurking in the jungle, lobbing giant boulders down at the two fugitives.

Eventually, a pirate ship arrives on the island. Leaving Olivia hidden in the foliage, Conan challenges their captain, an old rival. He slays the pirate captain, but is knocked unconscious by a stone from another pirate's sling. The pirates capture Conan and drag him to the ruins, where they discuss his fate, before passing out drunk. Meanwhile, Olivia narrowly escapes from a dark figure which pursues her close to the ruins.

Olivia sneaks past the drunken pirates and frees Conan. Soon, Conan slays the dark figure pursuing Olivia, a giant ape, which had also been hurling the boulders at them. As Conan recovers from his battle with the ape, he hears the beginning of a horrific slaughter back at the ruins.

The two quickly head back to the deserted pirate ship. As Conan prepares the ship to sail, a band of bruised and bewildered pirates appear while asking for his aid in leaving the "devil island". Conan challenges the pirates and they accept him as their new captain. At the end, Olivia begs Conan to allow her to stay with him and he, laughing, accepts, saying he will make her into a "Queen of the Blue Sea".

== Publication history ==
The story was republished in the collections Conan the Barbarian (Gnome Press, 1954), Conan the Freebooter (Lancer Books, 1968), and Black Colossus (Grant, 1979). It has more recently been published in the collections The Conan Chronicles Volume 1: The People of the Black Circle (Gollancz, 2000), Conan of Cimmeria: Volume One (1932-1933) (Del Rey, 2003), and The Complete Chronicles of Conan (Gollancz, 2006).

== Adaptation ==
The story was adapted by Roy Thomas, John Buscema and Alfredo Alcala in Savage Sword of Conan #4 in 1974, then by Tim Truman and Tomás Giorello in Conan the Cimmerian #22–25 in 2010. The Marvel adaptation uses the title Iron Shadows in the Moon, and was reprinted in issue 13 of "Conan Saga" dated May 1988. In 2019, Editions Glénat published a new version by Virginie Augustin (script and pencils) in a one-shot volume (78 pages). This version was published in English by publishing company Ablaze in their "Cimmerian" series of comics as The Cimmerian: Iron Shadows in the Moon.

Preceded by "Rogues in the House"	Original Howard Canon (publication order)	Succeeded by "Queen of the Black Coast"
Preceded by "The Hand of Nergal"	Original Howard Canon (Dale Rippke chronology)	Succeeded by "Black Colossus"
Preceded by Conan the Renegade	Complete Conan Saga (William Galen Gray chronology)	Succeeded by Conan of the Red Brotherhood
