= The Slithering Shadow =

Conan novelette by Robert E. Howard

- Short story by Robert E. Howard

Text available at Wikisource
- Original title: Xuthal of the Dusk
- Country: United States
- Language: English
- Genre: Fantasy

Publication
- Published in: Weird Tales
- Publication type: Pulp magazine
- Publisher: Rural Publishing Corporation
- Publication date: September 1933

Chronology
- Series: Conan the Cimmerian
Black Colossus	The Pool of the Black One

"The Slithering Shadow" is one of the original short stories starring the fictional sword and sorcery hero Conan the Cimmerian, written by American author Robert E. Howard and first published in the September 1933 issue of Weird Tales magazine. "The Slithering Shadow" is the original title, but the story is also known as "Xuthal of the Dusk" in further publications. It is set in the fictional Hyborian Age, and concerns Conan discovering a lost city in a remote desert while encountering a Lovecraftian demon known as Thog.

The story was republished in the collections The Sword of Conan (Gnome Press, 1952) and Conan the Adventurer (Lancer Books, 1966). It has more recently been published in the collections The Conan Chronicles Volume 1: The People of the Black Circle (Gollancz, 2000) as "The Slithering Shadow" and in Conan of Cimmeria: Volume One (1932–1933) (Wandering Star, 2002) and The Coming of Conan the Cimmerian (Del Rey, 2003) as "Xuthal of the Dusk."

== Plot summary ==
Conan and his ally, Natala the Brythunian, are the sole survivors of Prince Almuric's army which swept through the Lands of Shem and the wilderness of Stygia. With a Stygian host on their heels, Almuric's soldiers had cut their way across the kingdom of Kush, only to be annihilated near the edge of Stygia's southern desert.

In the resulting conflict, when the Stygians and Kushites surrounded the trapped remnants, Conan sliced his way through the Stygian militia and fled on a camel, with Natala, into the southern desert. For days, the two pushed on, seeking water, until their camel died. Then, they continued on foot.

When their canteen is empty, Conan prepares to slay Natala in an act of mercy-killing. However, they spy the distant city of Xuthal. Eventually, Conan and Natala enter Xuthal while pursued by an entrance guard. They soon encounter Thalis, a beautiful Stygian mage, who reveals the history of her fabled city and the existence of Thog. Thog is a monstrous demon from the city-states of ancient Valusia, his current form summoned by the sorcerers of Xuthal from the darkness between the stars. For an ageless time, Thog has haunted the depths of Xuthal in search of living flesh to support the continuing manifestation of his body on the physical plane.

Thalis falls in love with Conan and, to eliminate her rival, kidnaps Natala in the hopes of sacrificing her to Thog. Thalis first strips Natala of her tunic and flagellates her with a jewel-handled whip. Thog suddenly appears, snatches Thalis, and devours her. The demon returns for Natala, but Conan intervenes and saves her. Conan fights Thog with all his might, but is scarcely harming the demon's supernatural form, while receiving hideous wounds in the coils of its pseudopods and tentacles. However, Conan manages to pierce what he perceives as the head of the monster and throws it down a well. Conan frees Natala, who sets forth to help him, but he is rapidly dying. Fortunately, the Brythunian girl soon brings him a jade goblet full of golden wine, retrieved from a room with a dreaming woman of Xuthal in it. The beverage proves to be a life-giving elixir briefly mentioned by Thalis in a previous conversation, which miraculously heals all of Conan's wounds. Finally, the couple retrieve enough food and water for their journey through the rest of the desert. The two depart while Natala jokingly blames Conan for having aroused Thalis' lustful nature. He retorts playfully about the jealous nature of women.

== Reception ==
Fritz Leiber rated it as one of three of the worst Conan stories, which he said were "repetitious and childish, a self-vitiating brew of pseudo-science, stage illusions, and the 'genuine' supernatural."

Howard Andrew Jones reviewed the story in 2015 as part of a "Conan Re-Read" series of articles and was more positive. He stated that the story is "short, atmospheric, crammed with mystery and action, and doesn’t overstay its welcome."

== Adaptation ==
The story was adapted by Roy Thomas, John Buscema and Alfredo Alcala in Savage Sword of Conan #20, then by Fred Van Lente and Guiu Vilanova in Conan the Avenger #13–15 (2015).

Preceded by "Black Colossus"	Original Howard Canon (publication order)	Succeeded by "The Pool of the Black One"
Preceded by "The Snout in the Dark"	Original Howard Canon (Dale Rippke chronology)	Succeeded by "A Witch Shall be Born"
Preceded by Conan and the Mists of Doom	Complete Conan Saga (William Galen Gray chronology)	Succeeded by "Drums of Tombalku"
