= The People of the Black Circle =

Conan novella by Robert E. Howard

- Short story by Robert E. Howard
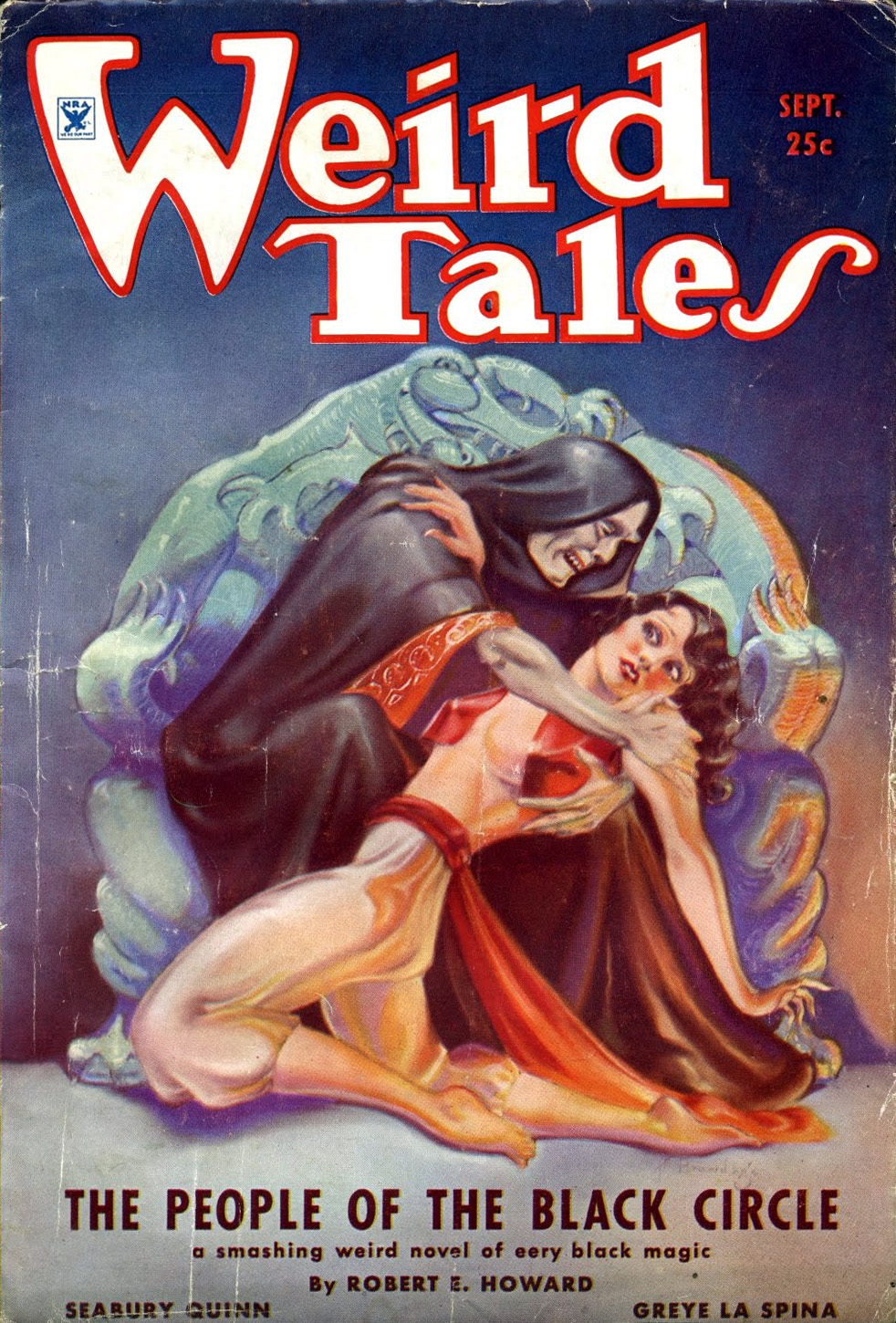
- Cover of Weird Tales, September 1934. Art by Margaret Brundage
- Country: United States
- Language: English
- Genre: Fantasy

Publication
- Publication type: Pulp magazine
- Publisher: Weird Tales
- Publication date: September–November 1934

Chronology
- Series: Conan the Cimmerian
The Devil in Iron	A Witch Shall be Born

"The People of the Black Circle" is one of the original novellas about Conan the Cimmerian, written by American author Robert E. Howard and first published in Weird Tales magazine in three parts over the September, October and November 1934 issues. Howard earned $250 for the publication of this story.

It is set in the fictional Hyborian Age and concerns Conan kidnapping an exotic princess from Vendhya (prehistoric India), while foiling a nefarious plot of world conquest by the Black Seers of Yimsha. Due to its epic scope and atypical Hindustan flavor, the story is considered an undisputed classic of Conan lore and is often cited by Howard scholars as one of his best tales. It is also one of the few Howard stories where the reader is given a deeper insight on magic and magicians beyond the stereotypical Hyborian depiction as demon conjurer-illusionist-priests.

== Plot summary ==
This Conan story is set in mythical Hyborian versions of India, Pakistan, and Afghanistan (Vendhya and Afghulistan respectively).

The death of Bunda Chand, emperor of Vendhya, (via a curse channeled through Chand's soul with a lock of his own hair) leads to the ascension of his sister, Devi Yasmina, who vows to exact vengeance on his killers, the Black Seers of Yimsha. Meanwhile, Conan has become chief of a tribe of Afghuli hillmen. Seven of his warriors have been captured by the Vendhyans and Yasmina intends on using the hillmen as collateral to force Conan into killing her enemies. However, Conan infiltrates the fortress where his men are imprisoned and kidnaps Yasmina instead (with the intent of exchanging her for his seven men). Inside his subterranean temple, Yimsha agrees to an alliance with Kerim Shah, a mercenary working for King Yezdigerd of Turan, who had arranged for Bunda Chand's assassination so he could conquer Vendhya in the resulting turmoil. However, a man named Khemsa, who was Kerim Shah's contact with the Black Seers, has fallen in love with the devi's maid Gitara. These two abandon their previous agenda, execute the captured hillmen, and pursue Queen Yasmina to kill her as well.

Cover of the first stand-alone book publication of the novella, published by Donald M. Grant, Publisher, Inc. in 1974. Art by David Ireland

Conan escapes into a Wazuli village near Zhaibar Pass and the Himelian Mountains (Hyborian equivalents of Khyber Pass and the Himalayas). Yar Afzal, chief of the village, is murdered by Khemsa, and the natives accuse Conan of killing him. He manages to escape with Yasmina. Soon, Khemsa catches up with Conan and Yasmina. However, his attack is interrupted by four rakshasas in service of Yimsha. The rakshasas kill Gitara, throw Khemsa down a cliff, stun Conan with an ancient spell, and capture Yasmina. Khemsa survives his fall off the cliffside long enough to give Conan a warning and his magic girdle.

Soon after, Kerim Shah and a tribe of Irakzais (Orakzai Pashtun people), hired by King Yezdigerd to capture Yasmina, encounter Conan. They join forces to rescue Yasmina, both explaining their private reasons for doing so, and approach the lair of Yimsha. All of the men are killed in their attempt. However, following Khemsa's advice, Conan succeeds in killing the Black Seers and rescuing Yasmina. As they escape, the two encounter the Turanian army in battle with Conan's tribe of hillmen, who blame him for the death of their captive fellows. Despite their attitude, Conan feels obliged to assist his tribe - but he is also loath to abandon the Devi. His problem is resolved when a Vendhyan army, invading the mountains to rescue their queen, arrives. Together, Conan with his Afghulis and Yasmina with her cavalry, they defeat the Turanian army. Conan leaves with the hillmen and Yasmina returns to her country.

Though they are strongly attracted to each other, the affair between Conan and Yasmina never gets beyond some kissing. Their respective roles pull them in opposite directions - she is Queen of Vendhiya, he's leader of nomadic hillmen engaged in constant robbery against Yasmina's domain. In the original Howard stories, they never meet again. In the 1957 novel Return of Conan, Björn Nyberg and L. Sprague de Camp allow the two rivals to encounter each other again for one night of intensive love-making, many years later - when he is already King of Aquilonia and there is no more a conflict of interest.

== Reception ==
Everett F. Bleiler noted the story's "much spectacular magic and interesting characters." Fritz Leiber praised the story lavishly, comparing it to "the melodramas of Marlowe" and declaring, "it has stirring language, strong motives, awesome sorcerers, brilliant magical devices, sympathetic hero-villains, and a Conan subdued enough to make the outcome interesting."

== Republishing history ==
The story was republished in the collections The Sword of Conan (Gnome Press, 1952) and Conan the Adventurer (Lancer Books, 1966). It was first published by itself in book form by Donald M. Grant, Publisher, Inc. in 1974. It has most recently been republished in the collections The Conan Chronicles Volume 1: The People of the Black Circle (Gollancz, 2000) and The Bloody Crown of Conan (Del Rey, 2005).

== Adaptations ==
The story was adapted by Roy Thomas, John Buscema and Alfredo Alcala in Savage Sword of Conan #16-19 (Reprinted in 2008 by Dark Horse Comics in Savage Sword of Conan, Volume Two – ISBN 1-59307-894-3). Dark Horse Comics also adapted the story as a miniseries by Fred Van Lente. The story has also been adapted by publishing company Ablaze in their "Cimmerian" series of comics.

== Notes ==
Preceded by "The Devil in Iron"	Original Howard Canon (publication order)	Succeeded by "A Witch Shall be Born"
Preceded by "The Devil in Iron"	Original Howard Canon (Dale Rippke chronology)	Succeeded by "Shadows in Zamboula"
Preceded by none	Grant Conan series (publication order)	Succeeded by A Witch Shall be Born
Preceded by Conan and the Shaman's Curse	Complete Conan Saga (William Galen Gray chronology)	Succeeded by Conan the Marauder
