= Conan the Barbarian (comics) =

Comic book series published by Marvel Comics

- The cover to Conan the Barbarian #1 (October 1970), by Barry Smith and John Verpoorten.

Publication information
- Publisher: Marvel Comics
- Schedule: Monthly
- Format: Ongoing series
- Publication date: October 1970 – December 1993
- No. of issues: 275 and 12 Annuals
- Main character: Conan

Creative team
- Written by: List: Roy Thomas (1-115, 240-275, Annual #2, 4-7, Giant-Size #1-4), J. M. DeMatteis (116, 118-130), Bruce Jones (131-134, 136-144, 147-149), Michael Fleisher Doug Moench Jim Owsley (172-213, Annual #8, 10-12), Alan Zelenetz Chuck Dixon Don Kraar
- Penciller: List: Barry Smith John Buscema Neal Adams Rich Buckler Mike Ploog Jim Starlin Howard Chaykin Marc Silvestri Alfredo Alcala Gary Kwapisz Val Semeiks Mike Docherty
- Inker: List: Ernie Chan Bob McLeod Vince Colletta Rudy Nebres Ricardo Villagrán
- Editor(s): Stan Lee; Roy Thomas

Conan the Barbarian is a comics book title starring the sword-and-sorcery character created by Robert E. Howard, published by the American company Marvel Comics. It debuted with a first issue cover-dated October 1970 and ran for 275 issues until 1993. A commercial success, the title launched a sword-and-sorcery vogue in American 1970s comics. He was often partnered with Red Sonja.

Marvel Comics reacquired the publishing rights in 2018 and started a new run of Conan the Barbarian in January 2019, at first with the creative team of writer Jason Aaron and artist Mahmud A. Asrar. This run ended in November 2021 after 25 issues, when Titan Comics acquired the license to publish Conan comic books in 2022.

== Publication history ==
Conan the Barbarian ran for 275 issues (cover dated October 1970–December 1993). The book had a single writer, Roy Thomas, on issues #1–115 (October 1970–October 1980) and then #240–275 (January 1991–December 1993). It was also the signature work of artist Barry Smith, who pencilled most issues between #1 and #24. Artist John Buscema pencilled the vast bulk of issues #25–190. Interim writers included J. M. DeMatteis, Bruce Jones, Michael Fleisher, Doug Moench, Jim Owsley, Alan Zelenetz, Chuck Dixon, and Don Kraar.

Thomas, Marvel's associate editor at the time, had obtained the licensed property from the estate of its creator, Robert E. Howard, after finding Conan chief among readers' requests for literary properties to be adapted to comics, which also included the pulp magazine character Doc Savage, The Lord of the Rings oeuvre of writer J. R. R. Tolkien, and Edgar Rice Burroughs' characters Tarzan and John Carter of Mars. Elaborating in 2010, he said,

I put together a memo for publisher Martin Goodman saying why we should [license a character]. ... I hadn't read a lot of Howard, I bought a couple of the books for the Frazetta covers but I'd never really read them. When Goodman gave us permission to license a character, we figured we couldn't afford Conan..... By that time, there'd been about half-a-decade of Conan coming out in Lancer paperbacks, so we figured no sense going after that, there was no way we were going to get it. I knew Lin Carter slightly, who had authored a character called Thongor, who was half Conan and half John Carter of Mars.... Lin was great, but his agent kept wanting us to offer more money than the $150 per issue that Martin Goodman had magnanimously said we could pay for rights.

Thomas said another reason for pursuing Thongor was that Marvel editor-in-chief Stan Lee "liked that name the most. . . . I soon got stalled by Lin Carter's agent on Thongor . . . and I got a sudden impulse to go after Conan. Later, following on the success of the Conan series, Lin Carter allowed Marvel to publish a Thongor comic, which appeared as a miniseries in Creatures on the Loose."

After reading and enjoying the paperback Conan of Cimmeria, Thomas contacted Glen Lord, literary agent for the Howard estate, and "I said we can't offer much money but it might increase Conan's audience and so forth, what do you think? I didn't have much elasticity, but I was so embarrassed by the $150 that I upped it to $200 without thinking. So that when Glen agreed ... I decided I'd have to write the first issue or so, so that if Goodman objected I could knock a couple pages off my rate to even things out."

The extra cost meant, however, that Marvel could not budget for Buscema, Thomas' first choice, serendipitously opening the door to Smith. Buscema, in a 1994 interview, recalled,

I was approached by Roy Thomas with the project to do Conan. He mailed a couple of the paperbacks to me and I read 'em and I loved 'em. I told Roy, 'This is what I want, something that I can really sink my teeth into. . . .' [A]t the time, Marvel was owned by Martin Goodman, and he felt that my rate was too high to take a gamble [with] on some new kind of [project]. It wasn't a superhero or anything that had been done before. The closest thing to that would be Tarzan. Anyway, he had no confidence in spending too much money on the book, and that's where Barry Smith came in — [he was] very cheap. I know what he got paid, and I'd be embarrassed to tell you how much it was, because I'd be embarrassed for Marvel.

Comics historian Les Daniels noted that "Conan the Barbarian was something of a gamble for Marvel. The series contained the usual elements of action and fantasy, to be sure, but it was set in a past that had no relation to the Marvel Universe, and it featured a hero who possessed no magical powers, little humor and comparatively few moral principles."

Marvel initially published Conan every two months. After sales of #1 were strong Marvel quickly made the title monthly, but sales dropped with each additional issue. Lee decided to cancel the comic with #7, not only because of the weak sales but to use Smith on more popular comics. Thomas argued against the decision and Lee relented, although the book became bimonthly again with #14. By #20 Conan again became monthly because of rising sales, and the comic became one of Marvel's most popular in the 1970s.

Elric of Melniboné first appeared in comics in Conan the Barbarian issues #14–15 (March–May 1972). The comics were written by Thomas and illustrated by Windsor-Smith, based on a story plotted by Michael Moorcock and Cawthorn, James. Red Sonja was introduced in issue #23 (February 1973).

In 2010, Comics Bulletin ranked Thomas' work on Conan the Barbarian with Smith and Buscema seventh on its list of the "Top 10 1970s Marvels".

== Annuals and Giant-Size series ==
Twelve issues of Conan Annual were published from 1973 to 1987. Giant-Size Conan was a series of 68 page giants which ran for five issues from September 1974 to 1975.

== Awards ==
Academy of Comic Book Arts Shazam Awards

1970

- Best New Talent: Barry Smith

1971

- Best Continuing Feature: Conan the Barbarian
- Best Writer (Dramatic): Roy Thomas

1973

- Best Individual Story (Dramatic): Song of Red Sonja from Conan the Barbarian #24 by Roy Thomas and Barry Smith

1974

- Best Continuing Feature: Conan the Barbarian
- Best Penciller (Dramatic): John Buscema
- Superior Achievement by an Individual: Roy Thomas

== Collected editions ==
=== Essential Marvel ===
- Essential Conan collects Conan the Barbarian #1–25, 530 pages, July 2000, Marvel Comics, ISBN 978-0785107514

=== Chronicles of Conan ===
Dark Horse Comics published the Chronicles of Conan series, which comprises 34 volumes released between 2003 and 2017. The chronicles are a digitally-recolored collection of the complete original 275-issue run of the Marvel Comics' title.

- Volume 1: Tower of the Elephant and Other Stories (2003) – collects issues 1–8.
- Volume 2: Rogues In the House and Other Stories (2003) – collects issues 9–13, 16.
- Volume 3: The Monster of the Monoliths and Other Stories (2003) – collects issues 14–15, 17–21 (also by Gil Kane).
- Volume 4: The Song of Red Sonja and Other Stories (2004) – collects issues 23–26 and Red Nails, originally published in Savage Tales 2 & 3
- Volume 5: The Shadow In the Tomb and Other Stories (2004) – collects issues 27–34.
- Volume 6: The Curse of the Golden Skull and Other Stories (2004) – collects issues 35–42
- Volume 7: The Dweller In the Pool and Other Stories (2005) – collects issues 43–51.
- Volume 8: Brothers of the Blade and Other Stories (2005) – collects issues 52–59
- Volume 9: Riders of the River-Dragons and Other Stories (2006) – collects issues 60–63, 65, 69–71
- Volume 10: When Giants Walk the Earth and Other Stories (2006) – collects issues 72–77, 79–81
- Volume 11: The Dance of the Skull and Other Stories (2007) – collects issues 82–86, 88–90
- Volume 12: The Beast King of Abombi and Other Stories (2007) – collects issues 91, 93–100
- Volume 13: Whispering Shadows and Other Stories (November 2007) – collects issues 92, 101–107
- Volume 14: Shadow of the Beast and Other Stories (2008) – collects issues 108–115
- Volume 15: The Corridor of Mullah-Kajar and Other Stories (July 2008) – collects issues 116–121 and Conan Annual #2
- Volume 16: The Eternity War and Other Stories (December 2008) – collects issues 122–126 and Conan Annual #4–5
- Volume 17: The Creation Quest and Other Stories (February 2009) – collects issues 127–134 and Conan Annual #6
- Volume 18: The Isle of the Dead and Other Stories (September 2009) – collects issues 135–142
- Volume 19: Deathmark and Other Stories (June 2010) – collects issues 143–150
- Volume 20: Night of the Wolf and Other Stories (December 2010) – collects issues 151–159
- Volume 21: Blood of the Titan and Other Stories (August 2011) – collects 160–167 and Conan Annual #7.
- Volume 22: Reavers In the Borderland and Other Stories (July 2012) – collects Conan Annual #8 and #9, and issues 168–173
- Volume 23: Well of Souls and Other Stories (April 2013) – collects issues 174–181 and Conan Annual #10
- Volume 24: Blood Dawn and Other Stories (July 2013) – collects issues 182–189 and Conan Annual #11
- Volume 25: Exodus and Other Stories (November 2013) – collects issues 190–198
- Volume 26: Legion of the Dead and Other Stories (April 2014) – collects issues 199–205 and Conan Annual #12
- Volume 27: Sands Upon the Earth and Other Stories (July 2014) – collects issues 206–214 and Handbook of the Conan Universe
- Volume 28: Blood And Ice and Other Stories (December 2014) – collects issues 215–223
- Volume 29: The Shape In the Shadow and Other Stories (March 2015) – collects issues 224–232
- Volume 30: The Death of Conan and Other Stories (December 2015) – collects issues 233–240
- Volume 31: Empire of the Undead and Other Stories (March 2016) – collects issues 241–249
- Volume 32: The Second Coming of Shuma-Gorath and Other Stories (August 2016) – collects issues 250–258
- Volume 33: The Mountain Where Crom Dwells and Other Stories (November 2016) – collects issues 259–267
- Volume 34: Betrayal in Zamora and Other Stories (March 2017) – collects issues 268–275

=== The Barry Windsor-Smith Conan Archives ===
- Volume 1 collects Conan the Barbarian #1–11, 200 pages, February 2010, Dark Horse Comics, ISBN 978-1595824417
- Volume 2 collects Conan the Barbarian #12–16 and #19–24, 288 pages, May 2010, Dark Horse Comics, ISBN 978-1595825063

=== Conan the Barbarian: The Original Marvel Years Omnibus ===
- Volume 1 collects Conan the Barbarian #1–26 plus additional material, 776 pages, January 2019, Marvel Comics, ISBN 978-1302915124
- Volume 2 collects Conan the Barbarian #27–51 plus additional material, 856 pages, August 2019, Marvel Comics, ISBN 978-1302915148
- Volume 3 collects Conan the Barbarian #52–83 plus additional material, 832 pages, January 2020, Marvel Comics, ISBN 978-1302917838
- Volume 4 collects Conan the Barbarian #84–115 plus additional material, 848 pages, October 2020, Marvel Comics, ISBN 978-1302917890
- Volume 5 collects Conan the Barbarian #116–149 plus additional material, 1048 pages, March 2021, Marvel Comics, ISBN 978-1302926564
- Volume 6 collects Conan the Barbarian #150–171 plus additional material, 672 pages, November 2021, Marvel Comics, ISBN 978-1302926588
- Volume 7 collects Conan the Barbarian #172–194 plus additional material, 680 pages, January 2022, Marvel Comics, ISBN 978-1302934323
- Volume 8 collects Conan the Barbarian #195–213 plus additional material, 624 pages, June 2022, Marvel Comics, ISBN 978-1302934347
- Volume 9 collects Conan the Barbarian #214–240 plus additional material, 704 pages, October 2022, Marvel Comics, ISBN 978-1302947255
- Volume 10 collects Conan the Barbarian #241–275 plus additional material, 944 pages, December 2022, Marvel Comics, ISBN 978-1302947279

=== Marvel Epic Collections ===
Volume	Subtitle	Years covered	Issues collected	Pages	Publication date	ISBN
Conan the Barbarian: The Original Marvel Years
1	The Coming of Conan	1970-1972	Conan the Barbarian (1970) #1-13 and material from Chamber of Darkness (1969) #4	352	June 23, 2020	978-1302925550
2	Hawks from the Sea	1972-1973	Conan the Barbarian (1970) #14-26	290	December 2020	
3	The Curse of the Golden Skull	1973-1974	Conan the Barbarian (1970) #27-42; material from Annual (1973) #1	336	July 2021	978-1302929565
4	Queen of the Black Coast	1974-1976	Conan the Barbarian (1970) #43-59, Giant-Size Conan (1974) #5 (cover only), material from Savage Sword of Conan (1974) #1	360	December 2021	978-1302929558
5	Of Once and Future Kings	1976-1977	Conan the Barbarian (1970) #60-71, Conan Annual #2-3 And Power Records #31 - Conan The Barbarian: Crawler In The Mists.	360	March 29, 2022	978-1302933531
6	Vengeance in Asgalun	1977-1978	Conan the Barbarian (1970) #72-88	328	September 27, 2022	978-1302933548
Conan Chronicles
1	Out of the Darksome Hills	2004–2005	Conan (2004) #0, #1–19	496	February 6, 2019	978-1302915902
2	The Heart of Yag-Kosha	2005–2007	Conan (2004) #20–39	504	April 3, 2019	978-1302915919
3	Return to Cimmeria	2007–2009	Conan (2004) #40–50; Conan the Cimmerian #0–7	504	October 2, 2019	978-1302916022
4	The Battle of Shamla Pass	2009-2010	Conan the Cimmerian #8-25	472	January 14, 2020	978-1302921910
5	The Horrors Beneath the Stones	2010-2012	Conan: Road of Kings #1-12; Conan the Barbarian #1-6	456	June 16, 2020	978-1302923273
6	The Song of Bêlit	2012-2014	Conan the Barbarian #7-25	472	January 26, 2021	978-1302923280
7	Shadows over Kush	2014 - 2015	Conan the Avenger #1-19	448	December 28, 2021	
8	Blood In His Wake	2015 - 2017	Conan the Avenger 20–25, Conan the Slayer 1-12	432	January 18, 2022	978-1302933708
King Conan Chronicles
1	Phantoms and Phoenixes		Conan and the Midnight God (2007) #1-5, King Conan: The Scarlet Citadel (2011) #1-4, King Conan: The Phoenix on the Sword (2012) #1-4, Conan: The Phantoms of the Black Coast (2012) #1-5, material from Age of Conan: Hyborian Adventures (2006) #1	464	August 16, 2022	9781302945954
2	Wolves and Dragons		King Conan: The Hour of the Dragon (2013) #1-6, King Conan: The Conqueror (2014) #1-6, Conan: Wolves Beyond the Border (2015) #1-4, and material from: Robert E. Howard's Savage Sword #5		October 2022	

== See also ==
- Conan (comics)
- Savage Sword of Conan
- Savage Avengers
