= Cary Nord =

Canadian comics artist

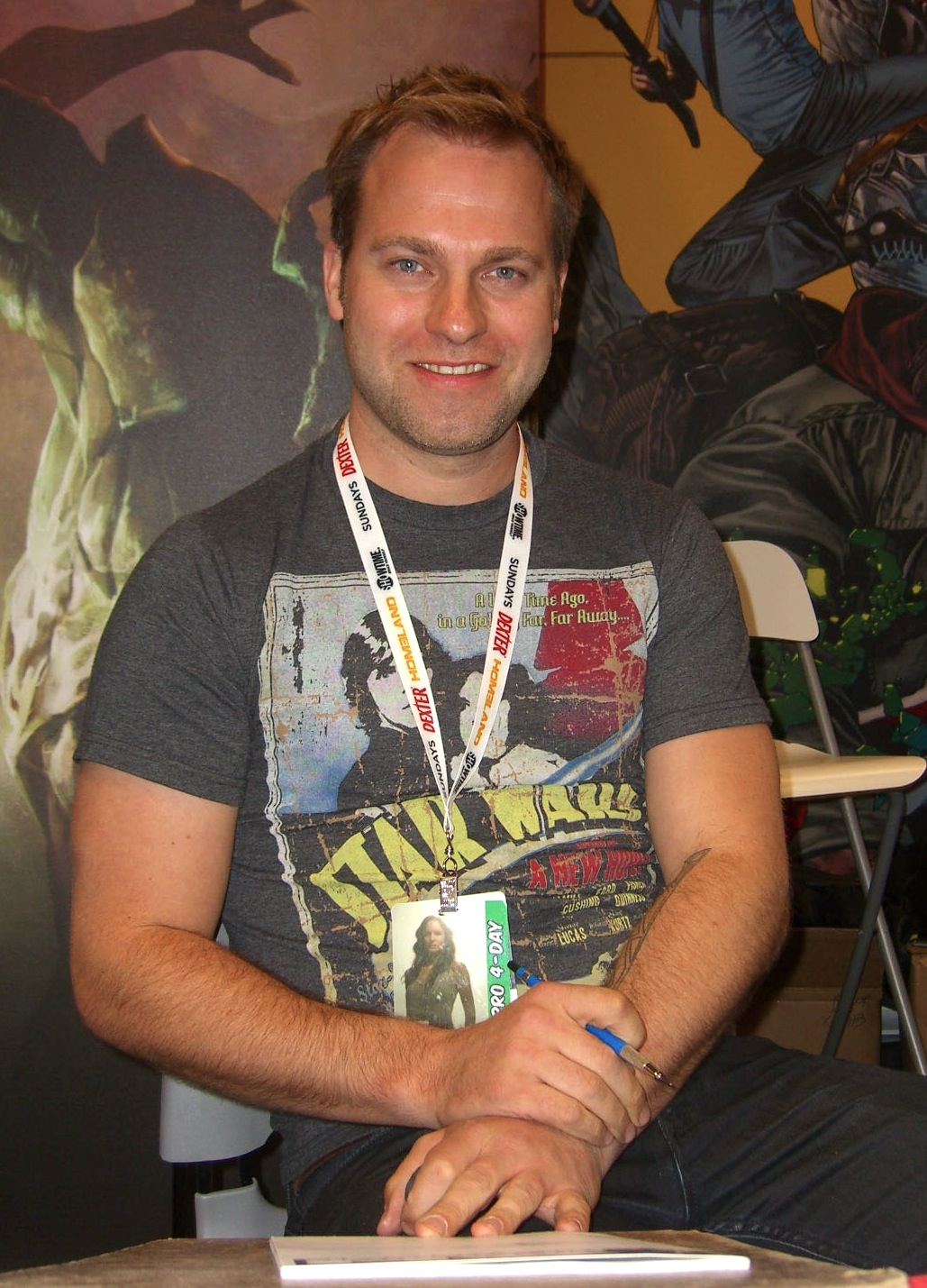
- Nord at the 2012 New York Comic Con
- Born: Calgary, Alberta, Canada
- Areas: Penciller; Painter
- Awards: 2004 Eisner Award

Conan the Barbarian drawn by Cary Nord

Cary Nord is a Canadian comics artist. He has worked on series such as Daredevil, X-Men, and Conan The Barbarian. Throughout his career Nord has worked on books including Superman for DC Comics; Wolverine, Mutant X, Ghost Rider, Spider-Man, and Thor for Marvel Comics; X-O Manowar for Valiant Entertainment, and Star Wars and Conan the Barbarian for Dark Horse Comics, the latter of which won him the 2004 Will Eisner Comic Industry Award for Best Single Issue.

== Early life ==
Cary Nord was born in Calgary, Alberta, Canada. He spent most of his youth drawing, and after attending the Alberta College of Art and Design he began to submit his work to Marvel and DC Comics.

== Career ==
Nord started his career with a letter and some original artwork sent into the editors of Marvel Comics's Marvel Comics Presents. He was awarded with a professional job penciling a Shang Chi serial. He eventually became the regular artist on Marvel's Daredevil series. He continued work on various Marvel and DC titles and is best known as the first artist for the new Conan the Barbarian series (written by Kurt Busiek) at Dark Horse. After departing Dark Horse, Cary signed a two-year contract with Marvel comics that yielded several 4 issue mini-series and a few stand alone issues. His most notable publications during his tenure at Marvel was 'Ultimate Human' and 'Secret Invasion: X-Men'. After his contract at Marvel expired in 2010, Nord worked on several independent projects, none of which have been published to date. He has also produced several covers for both DC and Dark Horse Comics.

On March 28, 2012, Nord signed with Valiant Entertainment to become the publisher's first exclusive creator. His Valiant Comics debut was alongside writer Robert Venditti for the newly re-launched X-O Manowar series in May 2012.

In 2015 Nord brought inner illustrations to the core rulebook of a role-playing game, Conan: Adventures in an Age Undreamed Of, first published in 2016 by Modiphius Entertainment.

== Awards ==
2004 Eisner Award for Best Single Issue or One-Shot (for Conan: The Legend #0, with Kurt Busiek; tied with Eric Powell for The Goon #1)
