= Robert E. Howard bibliography =

Bibliography

A list of prose works by Robert E. Howard. The works are sorted by genre, by series and then alphabetically. Untitled works and fragments (incomplete and unfinished works) are listed separately by their opening line.

Additional information is included where available, covering publication date and place, the amount Howard earned for the sale of the piece, any alternative titles and whether the work is in the public domain. Links to the freely available source texts, on wikisource or Project Gutenberg of Australia, are included in a separate column. These are marked with the appropriate icons.

== Fantasy stories ==
=== Conan the Barbarian ===
Howard's most famous creation, the Cimmerian barbarian, thief, pirate and King of Aquilonia during the pre-Ice Age Hyborian Age.

Many of the Conan stories not published during Howard's lifetime were edited by other authors before publication. The Fragment stories have all been completed by others since. Where either has occurred before the publication of the original material, this date is noted after the original material's publication date.

Title	First published	Cover	Source text	Notes
Beyond the Black River	Weird Tales 1935, May–June serial, two parts		"Beyond the Black River" (Wikisource)	Novella; Public Domain
Black Colossus	Weird Tales 1933, June		"Black Colossus" (Wikisource)	Sold for $130
The Black Stranger	Echoes of Valor 1987, February			Re-written by Howard as the Black Vulmea story Swords of the Red Brotherhood which was itself rewritten by L. Sprague de Camp into the Conan story The Treasure of Tranicos, first published in Fantasy Fiction Magazine, March 1953
Cimmeria	The Howard Collector #7 1965, Winter			Poem; Written in February 1932
The Devil in Iron	Weird Tales 1934, August		"The Devil in Iron" (Wikisource)	Sold for $115; Public Domain
Drums of Tombalku	The Pool of the Black One 1986			Fragment; Completed version by L. Sprague de Camp first published in Conan the Adventurer, 1966
The Frost-Giant's Daughter	Fantasy Fan 1934, March as Gods of the North		"Gods of the North" (Wikisource)	Alternate titles: Gods of the North, The Frost King's Daughter. Gods of the North is in the Public Domain
The God in the Bowl	The Tower of the Elephant 1975			Edited version by L. Sprague de Camp first published in Space Science Fiction, September 1952
The Hall of the Dead	Fantasy Crossroads #1 1974, November			Synopsis; Completed version by L. Sprague de Camp first published in The Magazine of Fantasy & Science Fiction, February 1967
The Hand of Nergal	The Last Celt 1976			Fragment; Completed version by Lin Carter first published in Conan, 1968
The Hour of the Dragon	Weird Tales 1935, December		"The Hour of the Dragon" (Wikisource)	Novel; published in book form as Conan the Conqueror. Sold for approximately $500
Iron Shadows in the Moon	Weird Tales 1934, April		"Shadows in the Moonlight" (Wikisource)	Alternate title: Shadows in the Moonlight. Sold for $120; Public Domain
Jewels of Gwahlur	Weird Tales 1935, March		"Jewels of Gwahlur" (Wikisource)	Alternate titles: Teeth of Gwahlur, The Servants of Bit-Yakin. Sold for $155; Public Domain
The People of the Black Circle	Weird Tales 1934, September–November serial, three parts		"The People of the Black Circle" (Wikisource)	Novella; Sold for $250; Public Domain
The Phoenix on the Sword	Weird Tales 1932, December		"The Phoenix on the Sword" (Wikisource)	Sold for $85
The Pool of the Black One	Weird Tales 1933, October		"The Pool of the Black One" (Wikisource)	Sold for $110
Queen of the Black Coast	Weird Tales 1934, May		"Queen of the Black Coast" (Wikisource)	Sold for $115; Public Domain
Red Nails	Weird Tales 1936, July—October serial, three parts		"Red Nails" (Wikisource)	Novella; Sold for $115; Public Domain
Rogues in the House	Weird Tales 1934, January		"Rogues in the House" (Wikisource)	Sold for $100
The Scarlet Citadel	Weird Tales 1933, January		"The Scarlet Citadel" (Wikisource)	Sold for $140
Shadows in Zamboula	Weird Tales 1935, November		"Shadows in Zamboula" (Wikisource)	Alternate title: The Man-Eaters of Zamboula. Sold for $120; Public Domain
The Snout in the Dark	Jewels of Gwahlur 1979			Fragment & Synopsis; Completed version by L. Sprague de Camp and Lin Carter first published in Conan of Cimmeria, 1969
The Tower of the Elephant	Weird Tales 1933, March		"The Tower of the Elephant" (Wikisource)	Sold for $95
The Vale of Lost Women	Magazine of Horror #15 1967, Spring		"The Vale of Lost Women" (Wikisource)	Disputed/unknown copyright status
A Witch Shall be Born	Weird Tales 1934, December		"A Witch Shall be Born" (Wikisource)	Sold for $155; Public Domain
Wolves Beyond the Border	The Conan Chronicles, Volume 2 2001			Fragment & Synopsis; Completed version by L. Sprague de Camp first published in Conan the Usurper, 1967
Xuthal of the Dusk	Weird Tales 1933, September		"The Slithering Shadow" (Wikisource)	Alternate title: The Slithering Shadow. Sold for $120

=== Kull ===
An Atlantean barbarian and King of Valusia in the ancient Thurian Age (predating Conan's Hyborian Age). He appears in the Bran Mak Morn story "Kings of the Night."

Title	First published	Alternative title(s)	Source Text	Notes
The Altar and the Scorpion	King Kull, 1967			
The Black City	King Kull, 1967	The Black Abyss		
By This Axe, I Rule	King Kull, 1967			Re-written by Howard into the Conan story The Phoenix on the Sword
The Curse of the Golden Skull	The Howard Collector #9, Spring 1967			
Delcardes' Cat	King Kull, 1967	The Cat and the Skull		
Exile of Atlantis	King Kull, 1967			Originally untitled, title created by Glenn Lord
The King and the Oak	Weird Tales, February 1939			Poem
The Mirrors of Tuzun Thune	Weird Tales, September 1929		"The Mirrors of Tuzun Thune" (Wikisource)	Sold for $20; Public Domain
The Shadow Kingdom	Weird Tales, August 1929		"The Shadow Kingdom" (Wikisource)	Sold for $100; Public Domain
The Skull of Silence	King Kull, 1967	The Screaming Skull of Silence		
The Striking of the Gong	The Second Book of Robert E. Howard, 1976			Edited version by Lin Carter first published in King Kull, 1967
Swords of the Purple Kingdom	King Kull, 1967			
"Wizard and Warrior"	Kull, 1978			Completed by Lin Carter from an untitled fragment
"Riders Beyond the Sunrise"	Kull, 1978			Completed by Lin Carter from an untitled fragment

=== Solomon Kane ===
A Tudor-period Puritan adventurer, wandering across Europe and Africa.

Title	First published	Alternative title(s)	Source text	Notes
Blades of the Brotherhood	Red Shadows, 1968	The Blue Flame of Vengeance, The Blue Flame of Death		Edited version by John Pocsik first published in Over the Edge, 1964; The "Malachi Grim" version is in the Public Domain)
The Castle of the Devil	Red Shadows, 1968			Fragment; Also features John Silent. Completed by Ramsey Campbell.
The Children of Asshur	Red Shadows, 1968			Fragment. Completed by Ramsey Campbell.
Death's Black Riders	The Howard Collector #10, Spring 1968			Fragment
The Footfalls Within	Weird Tales, September 1931		"The Footfalls Within" (Wikisource)	Sold for $56
Hawk of Basti	Red Shadows, 1968			Fragment. Completed by Ramsey Campbell.
The Hills of the Dead	Weird Tales, August 1930		"The Hills of the Dead" (Wikisource)	Sold for $70
The Moon of Skulls	Weird Tales, June–July 1930		"The Moon of Skulls" (Wikisource)	Novella; Sold for $200
The One Black Stain				Poem
Rattle of Bones	Weird Tales, June 1929		"Rattle of Bones" (Wikisource)	Sold for $20; Public Domain
Red Shadows	Weird Tales, August 1928	Solomon Kane	"Red Shadows" (Wikisource)	Sold for $20; Public Domain
The Return of Sir Richard Grenville				Poem
The Right Hand of Doom	Red Shadows, 1968			
Skulls in the Stars	Weird Tales, January 1929		"Skulls in the Stars" (Wikisource)	Sold for $30; Public Domain
Solomon Kane's Homecoming				Poem
Wings in the Night	Weird Tales, July 1932		"Wings in the Night" (Wikisource)	Sold for $134

=== Bran Mak Morn ===
The King of the Picts during the Roman invasion of Britain, eventually becoming the subject of a Cthulhu Mythos cult as the "Dark Man". He is referenced in the Kirowan story "The Children of the Night" and features in the Turlough O'Brien story "The Dark Man".

Title	First published	Alternative title(s)	Source text	Notes
Bran Mak Morn	Cromlech #3, 1988			Synopsis; Originally untitled
Bran Mak Morn: A Play	Bran Mak Morn: A Play & Others, 1983			Play; Fragment
The Drums of Pictdom				Poem; Related to, but does not feature, Bran
Kings of the Night	Weird Tales, November 1930		"Kings of the Night" (Wikisource)	Sold for $120; Also features Kull
The Little People	Coven 13, vol. 1 #3, January 1970			Related to, but does not feature, Bran
The Lost Race	Weird Tales, January 1927		"The Lost Race" (Wikisource)	Related to, but does not feature, Bran; Sold for $30
Men of the Shadows	Bran Mak Morn, 1969			Poem and short story, first Bran story
A Song of the Race				Poem
Worms of the Earth	Weird Tales, November 1932		"Worms of the Earth" (Wikisource)	Sold for $120; Public Domain
Untitled:
"A gray sky arched..."	Bran Mak Morn, 1969			

=== Turlogh Dubh O'Brien ===
An 11th-century Irish outcast.

Title	First published	Alternative title(s)	Source text	Notes
The Dark Man	Weird Tales, December 1931		"The Dark Man" (Wikisource)	Sold for $85; Features Bran Mak Morn
The Gods of Bal-Sagoth	Weird Tales, October 1931	The Blond Goddess of Bal-Sagoth	"The Gods of Bal-Sagoth" (Wikisource)	Sold for $140
The Shadow of the Hun	Shadow of the Hun, 1975		"The Shadow of the Hun" (Wikisource)	
Spears of Clontarf	Spears of Clontarf, 1978			Rewritten by Howard, with added fantasy, as The Grey God Passes and, as a modern horror story, as The Cairn on the Headland
The Twilight of the Grey Gods	Eons of the Night, 1996	The Grey God Passes		Based on Howard's own Spears of Clontarf
Untitled:
"The Dane came in with a rush, hurtling his huge body forward..."	Shadow of the Hun, 1975			

=== James Allison ===
A 1930s Texan who recalls his past lives as ancient heroes. Not to be confused with Kid Allison.

Title	First published	Alternative title(s)	Source text	Notes
Black Eons	The Howard Collector #9, Spring 1967			Fragment; Originally untitled, title created by Robert M. Price
Brachan the Kelt	The New Howard Reader #1, June 1998			Fragment; Completed version first published in The Barbarian Swordsmen, 1981
The Garden of Fear	Marvel Tales, July–August 1934		"The Garden of Fear" (Wikisource)	Public Domain
Genseric's Fifth-Born Son	Fantasy Crossroads #10/11, March 1977	Ghor, Kin-Slayer		Fragment; Completed version of 16 chapters further chapters, each by a different author, first published in full in Ghor, Kin-Slayer, 1997
The Guardian of the Idol	The Howard Reader #8, 2003			Fragment & Synopsis; Completed version by Gerald W. Page first published in Weird Tales #3, Fall 1981
Marchers of Valhalla	Marchers of Valhalla, 1972			Copyright 1972 by Glenn Lord. Plot: A mysterious woman helps John recall a past life... The men of Aesir and Vanir marched in olden times to the Gulf of Mexico. They found the ancient city of Khemnu, and defended it against raiders from the South, and were betrayed by treachery, so the city was in turn leveled by the scorned goddess Ishtar.
The Tower of Time	The New Howard Reader #2, August 1998	Akram the Mysterious		Fragment; Completed version by Lin Carter first published in Fantastic Stories, June 1975
The Valley of the Worm	Weird Tales, February 1934		"The Valley of the Worm" (Wikisource)	Public Domain

=== Other fantasy ===
Title	First published	Alternative title(s)	Source text	Notes
Almuric	Weird Tales, May–August 1939			Novel, sword and planet
People of the Dark	Strange Tales, June 1932		"People of the Dark" (Wikisource)	Sold for $134; Public Domain
Black Canaan	Weird Tales, June 1936		"Black Canaan" (Wikisource)	Sold for $108–120; Public Domain
Delenda Est	Worlds of Fantasy #1, 1968			
Golnor the Ape	Crypt of Cthulhu #38, February 1985			
The Isle of the Eons	The Gods of Bal-Sagoth, April 1979			
Nekht Semerkeht	Swords Against Darkness, February 1977			Fragment; Completed by Andrew J. Offutt; Possibly Howard's last work
Spear and Fang	Weird Tales, July 1925		"Spear and Fang" (Wikisource)	Howard's first published work; Sold for $16
The Tomb of the Dragon	The Shadow of the Beast, 1977			
Two Against Tyre	The Howard Collector #12, Spring 1970			
Under the Baobab Tree	Cross Plains #5, 1974			
Valley of the Lost	Magazine of Horror #13, Summer 1966	King of the Forgotten People		Disputed/unknown copyright status
The Voice of El-Lil	Oriental Stories, November 1930	Temptress of the Tower of Torture and Sin	"The Voice of El-Lil" (Wikisource)	Sold for $90; Public Domain
The Witch from Hell's Kitchen	Avon Fantasy Reader, 1952	The House of Arabu		

== Boxing stories ==
=== Sailor Steve Costigan ===
A 1930s sailor and boxer, travelling between ports aboard the tramp steamer Sea Girl.

Title	First published	Alternative title(s)	Source text	Notes
Alleys of Peril	Fight Stories, January 1931	Leather Lightning	"Alleys of Peril" (Project Gutenberg of Australia)	Sold for $80; Public Domain
The Battling Sailor				
The Pit of the Serpent	Fight Stories, July 1929	Manila Manslaughter	"The Pit of the Serpent" (Wikisource)	Sold for $90; Public Domain
Blow the Chinks Down!	Action Stories, October 1931	The House of Peril	"Blow the Chinks Down!" (Wikisource)	Edited into a Costigan story; Sold for $75
Blue River Blues				
Breed of Battle	Action Stories, November 1931	The Fighten'est Pair, Sampson Had a Soft Spot	"Breed of Battle" (Wikisource)	Sold for $80; Public Domain
The Bull Dog Breed	Fight Stories, February 1930	You Got to Kill a Bulldog	"The Bull Dog Breed" (Wikisource)	Sold for $90; Public Domain
By the Law of the Shark	REH Fight Magazine #4, October 1996			
Champ of the Forecastle	Fight Stories, November 1930	Champ of the Seven Seas, The Champion of the Forecastle	"Champ of the Forecastle" (Wikisource)	Sold for $65; Public Domain
Circus Fists	Fight Stories, December 1931	Slugger Bait	"Circus Fists" (Wikisource)	Sold for $70; Public Domain
Dark Shanghai	Action Stories, January 1932	One Shanghai Night	"Dark Shanghai" (Wikisource)	Sold for $75; Public Domain
Fist and Fang	Fight Stories, May 1930	Cannibal Fists	"Fist and Fang" (Wikisource)	Sold for $100; Public Domain
Flying Knuckles	REH Fight Magazine #4, October 1996			
General Ironfist	Jack Dempsey's Fight Magazine, June 1934		"General Ironfist" (Wikisource)	Sold for $35; Public Domain
Hard-Fisted Sentiment	REH Fight Magazine #4, October 1996			
The Honor of the Ship	REH Fight Magazine #4, October 1996			
Night of Battle	Fight Stories, March 1932	Shore Leave for a Slugger	"Night of Battle" (Wikisource)	Sold for $60; Public Domain
Sailor Costigan and the Swami	The Howard Review #7, April 1977			
Sailor's Grudge	Fight Stories, March 1930	Costigan vs. Kid Camera	"Sailor's Grudge" (Wikisource)	Sold for $75; Public Domain
The Sign of the Snake	Action Stories, June 1931		"The Sign of the Snake" (Wikisource)	Edited to be a Costigan story, written as "McClarney"; Sold for $75; Public Domain
The Slugger's Game	Jack Dempsey's Fight Magazine, May 1934		"The Slugger's Game" (Wikisource)	Sold for $35; Public Domain
Sluggers on the Beach	Jack Dempsey's Fight Magazine, August 1934		"Sluggers on the Beach" (Wikisource)	Sold for $35; Public Domain
Texas Fists	Fight Stories, May 1931	Shanghied Mitts	"Texas Fists" (Wikisource)	Sold for $75; Public Domain
The TNT Punch	Action Stories, January 1931	The Waterfront Law, The Waterfront Wallop	"The TNT Punch" (Wikisource)	Sold for $75; Public Domain
Vikings of the Gloves	Fight Stories, February 1932	Including the Scandinavian	"Vikings of the Gloves" (Wikisource)	Sold for $65; Public Domain
Waterfront Fists	Fight Stories, September 1930	Stand Up and Slug	"Waterfront Fists" (Wikisource)	Sold for $90; Public Domain
Winner Take All	Fight Stories, July 1930	Sucker!	"Winner Take All" (Wikisource)	Sold for $80; Public Domain
Untitled:
"I had just hung by sparring partner, Battling O'Toole..."	The Howard Review #2, March 1975			Fragment
"It was the end of the fourth round..."	The Howard Review #2, March 1975			Fragment
"The night Sailor Steve Costigan fought Battling O'Rourke..."	The Howard Review #2, March 1975			Fragment

=== Sailor Dennis Dorgan ===
A renamed version of Sailor Steve Costigan sailing in the Python, published under the pseudonym Patrick Ervin.

Title	First published	Alternative title(s)	Source text	Notes
Alleys of Darkness	Magic Carpet Magazine, January 1934	Alleys of Singapore	"Alleys of Darkness" (Wikisource)	Sold for $45–54; Public Domain
Alleys of Treachery	The Howard Collector #8, Summer 1966	The Mandarin Ruby		
The Destiny Gorilla	The Incredible Adventures of Dennis Dorgan, 1974	Sailor Costigan and the Destiny Gorilla, Sailor Dorgan and the Destiny Gorilla		
In High Society	The Incredible Adventures of Dennis Dorgan, 1974	Cultured Cauliflowers		
A Knight of the Round Table	The Incredible Adventures of Dennis Dorgan, 1974	Iron-Clad Fists		
Playing Journalist	The Incredible Adventures of Dennis Dorgan, 1974	A New Game for Costigan, A New Game for Dorgan		
Playing Santa Claus	The Incredible Adventures of Dennis Dorgan, 1974	A Two-Fisted Santa Claus		
Sailor Dorgan and the Jade Monkey	The Howard Collector #14, Spring 1971	Sailor Costigan and the Jade Monkey, The Jade Monkey		
The Turkish Menace	The Incredible Adventures of Dennis Dorgan, 1974	Sailor Dorgan and the Turkish Menace, Sailor Costigan and the Turkish Menace		Sold for $67 to Magic Carpet Magazine in May 1933 but the magazine was suspended before publication
The Yellow Cobra	The Incredible Adventures of Dennis Dorgan, 1974	Sailor Dorgan and the Yellow Cobra, A Korean Night, A Night Ashore		

=== Kid Allison ===
Not to be confused with James Allison.

Title	First published	Alternative title(s)	Source text	Notes
College Socks	Sport Story Magazine, September 1931	A Student of Sockology		Sold for $100; Disputed/unknown copyright status
The Drawing Card				
Fighting Nerves				Public Domain
Fistic Psychology				Public Domain
The Good Knight	Sport Story Magazine, December 1931	Kid Galahad		Sold for $90; Disputed/unknown copyright status
The Jinx				Public Domain
Man with the Mystery Mitts	Sport Story Magazine, October 1931			Sold for $100; Disputed/unknown copyright status
The Texas Wildcat				Public Domain
A Tough Nut to Crack				Public Domain
Untitled:
"Huh?" I was so dumbfounded I was clean off..."	Never published			Fragment

=== Ace Jessel ===
A black, happy-go-lucky boxer.

Title	First published	Alternative title(s)	Source text	Notes
The Apparition in the Prize Ring	Ghost Stories, April 1929	The Spirit of Tom Molyneaux	"Apparition in the Prize Ring" (Wikisource)	Sold for $95; Public Domain
Double Cross	Bran Mak Morn: A Play & Others, 1983			

=== Other Boxing stories ===
Title	First published	Alternative title(s)	Source text	Notes
Crowd Horror	Argosy All-Story Weekly, July 1929			Sold for $100
The Ferocious Ape				
The Fighting Fury				Public Domain
Fists of the Revolution	Fantasy Crossroads Special Edition #1, January 1976			
Iron-jaw	Dime Sports Magazine, April 1936 .	Fists of the Desert		
The Iron Man	Fight Stories, June 1930	Iron Men	"" (Project Gutenberg of Australia)	Sold for $200
A Man of Peace				
The Mark of the Bloody Hand	Writer of the Dark, 1986			
Misto' Demsey		Misto' Dempsey		Several small stories; Public Domain
Night Encounter	Never published			Fragment; Public Domain
Right Hook				
Shackled Mitts				
They Always Come Back	The Iron Man & Other Tales of the Ring, 1976			
Trail of the Snake				Fragment; Public Domain
The Voice of Doom	Crypt of Cthulhu #39, April 1986			
Weeping Willow				

== Western stories ==
=== Breckinridge Elkins ===
Humorous stories of a kind, strong but not very smart cowboy. All stories with the note "(A Gent from Bear Creek)" were later edited together to become part of the 1937 novel A Gent from Bear Creek.

Title	First published	Alternative title(s)	Source text	Notes
The Apache Mountain War	Action Stories, December 1935		The Apache Mountain War (Wikisource)	Public Domain
The Conquerin' Hero of the Humbolts	Action Stories, October 1936	Politics at Blue Lizard, Politics at Lonesome Lizard	The Conquerin' Hero of the Humbolts (Wikisource)	Public Domain
No Cowherders Wanted	Action Stories, September 1936	Gents in Buckskin	No Cowherders Wanted (Wikisource)	Public Domain
Cupid from Bear Creek	Action Stories, August 1935	The Peaceful Pilgrim	Cupid From Bear Creek (Wikisource)	(A Gent from Bear Creek); Public Domain
The Curly Wolf of Sawtooth	Star Western, September 1936	A Elston to the Rescue, A Elkins Never Surrenders		Sold for $60
Evil Deeds at Red Cougar	Action Stories, June 1936		Evil Deeds at Red Cougar (Wikisource)	Public Domain
The Feud Buster	Action Stories, June 1935		The Feud Buster (Wikisource)	(A Gent from Bear Creek); Public Domain
A Gent from Bear Creek	Action Stories, October 1934		A Gent from Bear Creek (Wikisource)	Sold for $46–55; Public Domain
A Gent from Bear Creek	A Gent from Bear Creek, 1937			Novel created by combining several short stories and editing them to fit; Public Domain
Guns of the Mountain	Action Stories, May–June 1934		Guns of the Mountain (Wikisource)	(A Gent from Bear Creek); Sold for $42–50; Public Domain
The Haunted Mountain	Action Stories, February 1935		The Haunted Mountain (Wikisource)	(A Gent from Bear Creek); Public Domain
High Horse Rampage	Action Stories, August 1936	Gents on the Rampage	High Horse Rampage (Wikisource)	Public Domain
Mayhem and Taxes	The Summit County Journal, September 1967			
Meet Cap'n Kidd	The Summit County Journal, July–October 1968			(A Gent from Bear Creek)
Mountain Man	Action Stories, March–April 1934		Mountain Man (Wikisource)	(A Gent from Bear Creek); Sold for $46–55; Public Domain
Pilgrims to the Pecos	Action Stories, February 1936	Weary Pilgrims on the Road	Pilgrims to the Pecos (Wikisource)	Sold for $60; Public Domain
Pistol Politics	Action Stories, April 1936		Pistol Politics (Wikisource)	Public Domain
The Riot at Cougar Paw	Action Stories, October 1935		The Riot at Cougar Paw (Wikisource)	Public Domain
The Road to Bear Creek	Action Stories, December 1934		The Road to Bear Creek (Wikisource)	(A Gent from Bear Creek); Sold for $42–50; Public Domain
The Scalp Hunter	Action Stories, August 1934	A Stranger in Grizzly Claw	The Scalp Hunter (Wikisource)	(A Gent from Bear Creek); Sold for $51–60; Public Domain
Sharp's Gun Serenade	Action Stories, January 1937	Educate or Bust	Sharp's Gun Serenade (Wikisource)	(A Gent from Bear Creek); Public Domain
Striped Shirts and Busted Hearts	The Summit County Journal, June 1967			(A Gent from Bear Creek)
War on Bear Creek	Action Stories, April 1935		War on Bear Creek (Wikisource)	(A Gent from Bear Creek); Sold for $54–60; Public Domain
When Bear Creek Came to Chawed Ear	The Summit County Journal, March–September 1971			(A Gent from Bear Creek)

=== Pike Bearfield ===
Title	First published	Alternative title(s)	Source text	Notes
The Diablos Trail	Bran Mak Morn: A Play & Others, 1983			
A Gent from the Pecos	Argosy, 3 October 1936	Shave That Hawg!		Sold for $40
Gents on the Lynch	Argosy, 17 October 1936			Sold for $42.50
The Riot at Bucksnort	Argosy, 31 October 1936			
While Smoke Rolled	Double Action Western, December 1956	While the Smoke Rolled	While Smoke Rolled (Wikisource)	Printed as a Breckenridge Elkins story; Public Domain

=== Grizzly Elkins ===
Title	First published	Alternative title(s)	Source text	Notes
Gunman's Debt	The Last Ride, 1978			
Law-Shooters of Cowtown	Cross Plains #4, Summer 1974	Law Guns of Cowtown		

=== Buckner Jeopardy Grimes ===
Title	First published	Alternative title(s)	Source text	Notes
Knife River Prodigal	Cowboy Stories, July 1937	A Texas Prodigal		
A Man-Eating Jeopard	Cowboy Stories, June 1936			Sold for $49–55; Disputed/unknown copyright status
Texas John Alden	Masked Rider Western, May 1944	Ring-Tailed Tornado, A Ringtailed Tornado	Texas John Alden (Wikisource)	Printed as a Breckinridge Elkins story; Public Domain

=== The Sonora Kid ===
AKA Steve Allison. He also appears in some of the El Borak stories.

Title	First published	Alternative title(s)	Source text	Notes
Brotherly Advice	The Sonora Kid, 1988			
Desert Rendezvous	The Sonora Kid, 1988			
The Devil's Joker	Cross Plains #6, 1975	The Devil's Jest, Outlaw Trails		
Knife, Bullet and Noose	The Howard Collector #6, Spring 1965	Knife, Gun and Noose		
Red Curls and Bobbed Hair	The Sonora Kid, 1988			
The Sonora Kid-Cowhand	The Sonora Kid, 1988			
The Sonora Kid's Winning Hand	The Sonora Kid, 1988			
The West Tower	The Sonora Kid, 1988			Fragment
Untitled:
"A blazing sun in a blazing sky, reflected from..."	The Sonora Kid, 1988			Fragment
"The Hades Saloon and gambling hall, Buffalotown..."	The Sonora Kid, 1988			Fragment
"The Hot Arizona sun had not risen high enough to heat..."	The Sonora Kid, 1988			Fragment
"Madge Meraldson set her traveling-bag on the station..."	The Sonora Kid, 1988			Fragment
"Steve Allison settled himself down comfortably in..."	The Sonora Kid, 1988			Fragment
"The way it came about that Steve Allison, Timoleon..."	The Sonora Kid, 1988			Fragment

=== Other Westerns ===
Title	First published	Alternative title(s)	Source text	Notes
Bill Smalley and the Power of the Human Eye	The Dark Man #1, 1991	The Power of the Human Eye		
Boot-Hill Payoff	Western Aces, October 1935	The Last Ride	Boot-Hill Payoff (Wikisource)	Novella; Finished work started by Robert Enders Allen; Sold for $78–110; Public Domain
Drums of the Sunset	The Cross Plains Review, November 1928 - January 1929	Riders of the Sunset		Sold for $20; Public Domain
The Extermination of Yellow Donory	Zane Grey Western Magazine, June 1970	The Killing of Yellow Donory		
Golden Hope Christmas	The Tattler, the Brownwood High School paper, December 1922		""Golden Hope" Christmas" (Wikisource)	
Showdown at Hell's Canyon	The Vultures, 1973	The Judgement of the Desert		
Six-Gun Interview	Never published			Fragment; Public Domain
Vulture's Sanctuary	Argosy, November 1936			
The Vultures of Whapeton	Smashing Novels Magazine, December 1936	The Vultures, The Vultures of Teton Gulch, The Vultures of Wahpeton	The Vultures of Whapeton (Project Gutenberg of Australia)	Novella; Sold for 135–150; This story has two endings

== Historical stories ==
See also Solomon Kane, Bran Mak Morn and Turlough Dubh O'Brien for historical stories with fantasy elements.

=== El Borak ===
A Texan gunman in early 20th Century Afghanistan. Several of the El Borak stories also feature The Sonora Kid.

Title	First published	Alternative title(s)	Source text	Notes
Blood of the Gods	Top-Notch, July 1935		"Blood of the Gods" (Wikisource)	Novella; Disputed/unknown copyright status
The Coming of El Borak	The Coming of El Borak, September 1987			
The Country of the Knife	Complete Stories, August 1936	Sons of the Hawk	"The Country of the Knife" (Wikisource)	Novella; Sold for $120; Disputed/unknown copyright status
The Daughter of Erlik Khan	Top-Notch, December 1934		"The Daughter of Erlik Khan" (Wikisource)	Novella; Sold for $195–230; Disputed/unknown copyright status
El Borak	1: The Coming of El Borak, September 1987; 2: North of the Khyber, December 1987			Two stories were printed under this title, the second features the Sonora Kid. The synopsis of one version is in the Public Domain
Hawk of the Hills	Top-Notch, June 1935		"Hawk of the Hills" (Wikisource)	Novella; Disputed/unknown copyright status
Intrigue in Kurdistan	Pulse Pounding Adventure Stories #1, December 1986			
The Iron Terror	The Coming of El Borak, September 1987			
Khoda Khan's Tale	The Coming of El Borak, September 1987			
The Land of Mystery	North of the Khyber, December 1987			Features the Sonora Kid
The Lost Valley of Iskander	The Lost Valley of Iskander, 1974	Swords of the Hills		
North of Khyber	North of the Khyber, December 1987			Features the Sonora Kid
A Power Among the Islands	North of the Khyber, December 1987			Features the Sonora Kid
The Shunned Castle	North of the Khyber, December 1987			Features the Sonora Kid
Son of the White Wolf	Thrilling Adventures, December 1936		"Son of the White Wolf" (Wikisource)	Sold for $50; Disputed/unknown copyright status
Three-Bladed Doom	REH Lone Star Fictioneer #4, Spring 1976 (short) and Three-Bladed Doom, 1977 (long)			Novella; Printed in both a long and shortened version; Edited by L. Sprague de Camp into a Conan story called The Flame Knife
The White Jade Ring	"The Early Adventures of El Borak", 2010			Fragment; Features the Sonora Kid
Untitled:
"Gordon, the American whom the Arabs call El Borak..."	The Coming of El Borak, September 1987			
"When Yar Ali Khan crept into the camp of Zumal Khan..."	"The Early Adventures of El Borak", 2010			Fragment

=== Dark Agnes de Chastillon ===
A red-haired swordswoman in 16th Century France.

Title	First published	Alternative title(s)	Source text	Notes
Blades for France	Blades for France, 1975			
Sword Woman	REH:Lone Star Finctioneer #2, Summer 1975			
Mistress of Death	Witchcraft & Sorcery Volume 1 Number 5, January–February 1971			Fragment; Completed by Gerald W. Page

=== Cormac FitzGeoffrey ===
A Norman/Gael knight fighting in the Crusades.

Title	First published	Alternative title(s)	Source text	Notes
The Blood of Belshazzar	Oriental Stories, Fall 1931		"The Blood of Belshazzar" (Wikisource)	Sold for $115; Public Domain
The Slave-Princess	Hawks of Outremer, 1979			Fragment
Hawks of Outremer	Oriental Stories, April–May–June 1931		"Hawks of Outremer" (Wikisource)	Sold for $120; Public Domain

=== Kirby O'Donnell ===
An American posing as a Kurdish mercenary in Central Asia.

Title	First published	Alternative title(s)	Source text	Notes
The Curse of the Crimson God	Swords of Shahrazar, 1978	The Trail of the Blood-Stained God		Edited by L. Sprague de Camp into the Conan story The Blood-Stained God, which was first published in Tales of Conan, 1955
Swords of Shahrazar	Top-Notch, October 1934	The Treasure of Shaibar Khan		Sold for $124–147; Disputed/unknown copyright status
The Treasure of Tartary	Thrilling Adventures, January 1935	Gold From Tartary	"The Treasure of Tartary" (Wikisource)	Sold for $42–50; Public Domain; Plot: As Shahrazar is overrun by raiders, O'Donnnell stumbles on a treasure heaped to the roof and a murderous plot to subjugate India.

=== Cormac Mac Art ===
An Irish pirate during the Dark Ages.

Title	First published	Alternative title(s)	Source text	Notes
The Night of the Wolf	Bran Mak Morn, 1969			
Swords of the Northern Sea	Tigers of the Sea, 1974			
The Temple of Abomination	Tigers of the Sea, 1974			Fragment; Completed by Richard L. Tierney
Tigers of the Sea	Tigers of the Sea, 1974			Fragment & Synopsis; Completed by Richard L. Tierney

=== Lal Singh ===
Title	First published	Alternative title(s)	Source text	Notes
The Further Adventures of Lal Singh	The Adventures of Lal Singh, 1985			
Lal Singh, Oriental Gentleman	The Adventures of Lal Singh, 1985			
The Tale of the Rajah's Ring	The Adventures of Lal Singh, 1985			

=== Black Vulmea ===
An Irish pirate sailing the Caribbean.

Title	First published	Alternative title(s)	Source text	Notes
Black Vulmea's Vengeance	Golden Fleece, November 1938		"Black Vulmea's Vengeance" (Wikisource)	
Swords of the Red Brotherhood	Black Vulmea's Vengeance, 1976			Novella; Howard based this on a rewritten Conan story The Black Stranger; It was itself edited into another Conan story, The Treasure of Tranicos, by L. Sprague de Camp, which was first published in Fantasy Fiction Magazine, March 1953; Public Domain

=== Helen Tavrel ===
Howard's female pirate of the Caribbean.

Title	First published	Alternative title(s)	Source text	Notes
Isle of Pirate's Doom	Isle of Pirate's Doom, 1975			Although included in the Black Vulmea collection, Vulmea does not appear in this story.

=== Other historical stories ===
Title	First published	Alternative title(s)	Source text	Notes
Gates of Empire	Golden Fleece, January 1939	The Road of the Mountain Lion	"Gates of Empire" (Wikisource)	
Hawks Over Egypt	The Road of Azrael, 1979			Edited by L. Sprague de Camp into the Conan story Hawks Over Shem, first published in Fantastic Universe, October 1955; The short version is in the Public Domain
The King's Service	The King's Service, 1975			
The Lion of Tiberias	Magic Carpet Magazine, July 1933		"The Lion of Tiberias" (Wikisource)	Sold for $110
Lord of Samarcand	Oriental Stories, Spring 1932	The Lame Man	"Lord of Samarcand" (Wikisource)	Sold for $140; Public Domain
The Sowers of the Thunder	Oriental Stories, Winter 1932		"The Sowers of Thunder" (Wikisource)	Sold for $160; References Cormac Fitzgeoffrey; Public Domain
Spears of the East	The Golden Caliph, 1923			
The Track of Bohemund	The Road of Azrael, 1979			
Under the Great Tiger	The All-Around Magazine, May–July 1923			Collaboration with Tevis Clyde Smith; The All-Around Magazine was Howard & Smith's own amateur magazine
Red Blades of Black Cathay	Oriental Stories, February–March 1931		"Red Blades of Black Cathay" (Wikisource)	Based on research by Tevis Clyde Smith; Sold for $118; Public Domain
The Road of Azrael	Chacal #1, Winter 1976			
The Shadow of the Vulture	Magic Carpet Magazine, January 1934		"The Shadow of the Vulture" (Wikisource)	Sold for $140; This is the only Howard story to feature Red Sonya; Public Domain
The Road of the Eagles	The Road of Azrael, 1979	The Way of the Swords		Edited by L. Sprague de Camp into the Conan story Conan, Man of Destiny first published in Fantastic Universe, December 1955, then published as The Road of the Eagles in Tales of Conan, 1955
Untitled:
"The wind from the Mediterranean wafted..."	Amra, November 1959			Fragment

== Horror stories ==
=== John Kirowan ===
These stories are part of the Cthulhu Mythos

Title	First published	Alternative title(s)	Source text	Notes
The Black Stone	Weird Tales, November 1931		The Black Stone (Wikisource)	Sold for $56; It does not mention the narrator's name, but appears to be a Kirowan story
The Children of the Night	Weird Tales, April–May 1931		The Children of the Night (Project Gutenberg of Australia)	Sold for $60; References Bran Mak Morn & Conan the Barbarian
Dagon Manor	Shudder Stories #4, March 1986			Fragment; Originally untitled; Completed by C. J. Henderson
Dig Me No Grave	Weird Tales, February 1937	John Grimlan's Debt	Dig Me No Grave (Wikisource)	Sold for $100
The Dwellers Under the Tombs	Lost Fantasies #4, 1976	His Brother's Shoes		
The Haunter of the Ring	Weird Tales, June 1934		The Haunter of the Ring (Project Gutenberg of Australia)	Sold for $60; References Conan the Barbarian
The Thing on the Roof	Weird Tales, February 1932		The Thing on the Roof (Project Gutenberg of Australia)	Sold for $40; It does not mention the narrator's name, but appears to be a Kirowan story

=== The Faring Town Saga ===
Title	First published	Alternative title(s)	Source text	Notes
A Legend of Faring Town	Verses in Ebony, 1975			Poem
Restless Waters	Spaceway Science Fiction, September–October 1969	The Horror at the Window		
Sea Curse	Weird Tales, May 1928		"Sea Curse" (Wikisource)	Sold for $17-20. Copyright 1928 by Popular Fiction Publishing Company. Plot: A boy relates how John Kulrek defiled a simple girl, and her aunt, Moll Farrell, the sea witch, laid on him a curse that brought him back from sea in a hell-ship rowed by skeletons.
Out of the Deep	Magazine of Horror #18, November 1967			Disputed/unknown copyright status Plot: Adam Falcon sailed at dawn, and washed ashore at dusk. But the thing was not Adam, and wreaks terror through the night. Only the village idiot, hearing a whisper from the sea, dares confront the creature.

=== De Montour ===
A Norman werewolf.

Title	First published	Alternative title(s)	Source text	Notes
In the Forest of Villefère	Weird Tales, August 1925		In the Forest of Villefère (Wikisource)	Sold for $8
Wolfshead	Weird Tales, April 1926		Wolfshead (Wikisource)	Sold for $50
Wolfsdung	Cromlech #3, 1988			

=== Weird West ===
Weird West stories are hybrids, a combination of a Western with another genre, usually horror, occult, or fantasy.

Title	First published	Alternative title(s)	Source text	Notes
The Dead Remember	Argosy, August 1936			Sold for $17.50
For the Love of Barbara Allen	The Magazine of Fantasy & Science Fiction, August 1966			Copyright 1966 by Mercury Press, Inc. Plot: A snatch of song and a blow to the head send a man back into his ancestor's body for a Civil War battle - and a chance to relieve an old maid's heart as her lover briefly returns.
The Haunted Hut	Weirdbook Two, 1969			
The Horror from the Mound	Weird Tales, May 1932	The Monster from the Mound	The Horror from the Mound (Project Gutenberg of Australia)	Sold for $65
A Horror in the Night	Cross Plains #3, March 1974			
The Man on the Ground	Weird Tales, July 1933			Sold for $20
Old Garfield's Heart	Weird Tales, December 1933	Old Garrod's Heart		Sold for $35
Pigeons From Hell	Weird Tales, May 1938		"Pigeons from Hell (Wikisource)	
Secret of Lost Valley	Startling Mystery Stories #4, Spring 1967	The Valley of the Lost	Included in Marchers of Valhalla	Copyright 1967 by Health Knowledge, Inc. Plot: The Reynolds-McCrill feud ends in Lost Valley when dead men walk and a refugee stumbles into the caverns of a lost race of lizard-men.
The Shadow of the Beast	The Shadow of the Beast, 1977			
The Shadow of Doom	The Howard Collector #8, Summer 1966			
The Thunder-Rider	Marchers of Valhalla, 1977			Plot: A city Indian, John Garfield, dreams of past lives... One was the Comanche Iron Heart, the Thunder-Rider, who wandered into an ensorcelled plain and rescued Conchita the woman-warrior from Aztecs and giants.

=== Other Weird Menace ===
Title	First published	Alternative title(s)	Source text	Notes
Black Hound of Death	Weird Tales, November 1936			Sold for $90–100; Public Domain
Black Talons	Strange Detective Stories, December 1933	Talons in the Dark	Black Talons (Wikisource)	Sold for $55–65; Public Domain
Black Wind Blowing	Thrilling Mystery, June 1936		Black Wind Blowing (Project Gutenberg of Australia)	Sold for $40; Disputed/unknown copyright status
The Brazen Peacock	REH: Lone Star Fictioneer #3, Fall 1975			
Devils of Dark Lake	WT 50: A Tribute to Weird Tales, 1974			
The Grisly Horror	Weird Tales, February 1935	Moon of Zambebwei	Moon of Zambebwei (Project Gutenberg of Australia)	Sold for $99–110; Public Domain
Guests of the Hoodoo Room	Shudder Stories #1, June 1984			
The Hand of Obeah	Crypt of Cthulhu #16, September 1983			
The House of Om	Shudder Stories #2, December 1984			Synopsis
The Return of Skull-Face	The Return of Skullface, 1977	Taveral Manor		Fragment; Completed by Richard A. Lupoff
Skull-Face	Weird Tales, October–December 1929		Skull-Face (Project Gutenberg of Australia)	Novella; Sold for $300; Public Domain
The Spell of Damballah	Revelations of Yuggoth #1, November 1987			

=== Other Cthulhu Mythos stories ===
Title	First published	Alternative title(s)	Source text	Notes
Arkham	Weird Tales, August 1932			Sold for $1
The Black Bear Bites	From Beyond the Dark Gateway #3, 1974			
Black Eons	The Howard Collector #9, Spring 1967			Fragment; Originally untitled; Completed & titled version by Robert M. Price first published in Fantasy Book, June 1985
Candles				Poem
The Challenge from Beyond	Fantasy Magazine, September 1935		The Challenge from Beyond (Project Gutenberg of Australia)	"Round Robin" story with C.L. Moore, A. Merritt, H. P. Lovecraft & Frank Belknap Long; Public Domain
The Door to the Garden	Fantasy Crosswinds #2, January 1977	The Door to the World		Fragment
The Fire of Asshurbanipal	Weird Tales, December 1936		The Fire of Asshurbanipal (Project Gutenberg of Australia)	Sold for $100; Edited from an earlier complete draft, with no horror element, by Howard. Non-horror version first published in The Howard Collector #16, Spring 1972; The horror version is in the Public Domain
The House in the Oaks	The Howard Reader #8, 2003	The House		Fragment; Version completed by August Derleth first published in Dark Things, 1971
Usurp the Night	Weirdbook Three, 1970	The Hoofed Thing		

=== Other horror stories ===
Title	First published	Alternative title(s)	Source text	Notes
Black Country	Weirdbook Six, 1973			Public Domain
The Cairn on the Headland	Strange Tales, January 1933		The Cairn on the Headland (Wikisource)	Sold for $144; Public Domain
Casonetto's Last Song	Etchings and Odysseys #1, 1973			
The Cobra in the Dream	Weirdbook One, 1968			
Dermod's Bane	Magazine of Horror #17, Fall 1967			Disputed/unknown copyright status
The Devil's Woodchopper	The Grim Land and Others, 1976			Fragment; Completed by Tevis Clyde Smith
The Dream Snake	Weird Tales, February 1928		"The Dream Snake" (Wikisource)	Sold for $20
The Fear-Master	Crypt of Cthulhu #22, April 1984			
The Fearsome Touch of Death	Weird Tales, February 1930	The Touch of Death	The Fearsome Touch of Death (Wikisource)	Sold for $18
The Hyena	Weird Tales, March 1928		"The Hyena" (Wikisource)	Sold for $25; Public Domain
The Noseless Horror	Magazine of Horror #31, February 1970			Disputed/unknown copyright status
The Return of the Sorcerer	Bicentennial Tribute to REH, 1976			
Serpent Vines	Witchcraft and Sorcery #10, 1974			
Spectres in the Dark	WT 50: A Tribute to Weird Tales, 1974			
The Supreme Moment	Crypt of Cthulhu #25, September 1984			
A Thunder of Trumpets	Weird Tales, September 1938			With Frank Thurston Torbett. Copyright 1938 by Popular Fiction Publishing Company. Plot: In India, an English girl is saved from a tiger by Ranjit Bhatarka. Infatuated, she seeks his company. But the locals warn he's a Hindoo, an ancient holy man to be feared.
Untitled		"The night was damp, misty, the air possessing a certain..."	Fantasy Crossroads #7, February 1976	Fragment

== Detective stories ==
=== Steve Harrison ===
A police detective, often coming across weird cases on his River Street patrol in Chinatown.

Title	First published	Alternative title(s)	Source text	Notes
The Black Moon	Bran Mak Morn: A Play & Others, 1983			
Fangs of Gold	Strange Detective Stories, February 1934	People of the Serpent	"Fangs of Gold (Wikisource)	Sold for $85-100; Public Domain
Graveyard Rats	Thrilling Mystery, February 1936		"Graveyard Rat (Wikisource)	Disputed/unknown copyright status
The House of Suspicion	The Second Book of Robert E. Howard, 1976	House of Fear		
Lord of the Dead	Skull-Face, 1978	Dead Man's Doom		
The Mystery of Tannernoe Lodge	Lord of the Dead, 1981			Fragment; Completed by Fred Blosser
Names in the Black Book	Super Detective Stories, May 1934		"Names in the Black Book (Wikisource)	Sold for $85-100; Public Domain
The Silver Heel	Two-Fisted Detective Stories, May 1984			
The Tomb's Secret	Strange Detective Stories, February 1934	Teeth of Doom	"The Tomb's Secret (Wikisource)	Main character changed to "Brock Rollins" for its first publication: Sold for $72–85; Public Domain
The Voice of Death	Two-Fisted Detective Stories, May 1984			
Untitled:
"Steve Harrison received a wire from Joan Wiltshaw..."	Two-Fisted Detective Stories, May 1984			Synopsis only

=== Butch Gorman & Brent Kirby ===
Private detectives.

Title	First published	Alternative title(s)	Source text	Notes
Hand of the Black Goddess	Bran Mak Morn: A Play & Others, 1983	Scarlet Tears		
Sons of Hate	Two-Fisted Detective Stories, May 1984			

=== Steve Bender, Weary McGraw and the Whale ===
Title	First published	Alternative title(s)	Source text	Notes
The Ghost with the Silk Hat	Writer of the Dark, 1986			
Westward Ho!	Never published			Fragment; Public Domain
The Wild Man	Never published			Fragment
Untitled:
"William Aloysius McGraw's father was red-headed and..."	Never published			Fragment

== Comedy stories ==
Title	First published	Alternative title(s)	Source text	Notes
After the Game	Yellow Jacket, October 1926		"After the Game" (Wikisource)	
Cupid vs. Pollux	Yellow Jacket, October 1927		"Cupid vs. Pollux" (Wikisource)	
Eighttoes Makes a Play	Red Blades of Black Cathay, 1971			This story has two endings
Halt! Who Goes There?	Yellow Jacket, September 1924		"Halt! Who Goes There?" (Wikisource)	
The Reformation: A Dream	Yellow Jacket, April 1927	The Reformation of a Dream	"The Reformation: A Dream" (Wikisource)	
The Sheik	The Tattler, the Brownwood High School paper, March 1923		"The Sheik" (Wikisource)	
Sleeping Beauty	Yellow Jacket, October 1926		"Sleeping Beauty" (Wikisource)	
The Thessalians	Yellow Jacket, January 1927		"The Thessalians" (Wikisource)	
Weekly Short Story	Yellow Jacket, November 1926		"Weekly Short Story" (Wikisource)	
West Is West	The Tattler, the Brownwood High School paper, December 1922		"West Is West" (Wikisource)	
Ye College Days	Yellow Jacket, January 1927		"Ye College Days" (Wikisource)	

== Spicy stories ==
The "Spicy" pulp magazines printed stories that were considered scandalous at the time (elements of nudity and implied sex).

=== Wild Bill Clanton ===
Title	First published	Alternative title(s)	Source text	Notes
Desert Blood	Spicy Adventure Stories, June 1936	Revenge by Proxy		Public Domain
The Dragon of Kao Tsu	Spicy Adventure Stories, September 1936			Sold for $26.50; Public Domain
Murderer's Grog	Spicy Adventure Stories, January 1937	Outlaw Working		Sold for $27; Public Domain
The Purple Heart of Erlik	Spicy Adventure Stories, November 1936	Nothing to Lose	"The Purple Heart of Erlik (Wikisource)	Sold for $26; Public Domain
She Devil	Spicy Adventure Stories, April 1936	The Girl on the Hell Ship	"She Devil (Wikisource)	Sold for $48–54; Public Domain
Ship in Mutiny	The She Devil, 1983			

=== Other Spicy stories ===
Title	First published	Alternative title(s)	Source text	Notes
Bastards All!	Lewd Tales, 1987			Play
Daughters of the Feud	Fantasy Crossroads #8, May 1976			
Guns of Khartum	REH Lone Star Fictioneer #3 Fall 1975			
Miss High-Hat	Risque Stories #4, October 1986			
She-Cats of Samarcand	The New Howard Reader #4, January 1999			
Songs of Bastards	Lewd Tales, 1987			Play

== "True Adventure" stories ==
Title	First published	Alternative title(s)	Source text	Notes
The Block	Pay Day, 1986			
The Curse of Greed	Fantasy Crosswinds #1, January 1977			
The Devil in his Brain	Lurid Confessions #1, June 1986			
Diogenes of Today	Red Blades of Black Cathay, 1971			Written with Tevis Clyde Smith
Le Gentil Homme le Diable	The Toreador, June 1925			
The Heathen	The Howard Collector #13, Fall 1970			
The Ideal Girl	The Tattler, the Brownwood High School paper, January 1925		"The Ideal Girl" (Wikisource)	
The Loser	REH: Lone Star Fictioneer #1, Spring 1975			
A Matter of Age	Lurid Confessions #1, June 1986			
Midnight	The Junto, September 1929			
Musings of a Moron	The Howard Collector #10, Spring 1968			
Nerve	Pay Day, 1986			
The Nut's Shell	Pay Day, 1986			
Pay Day	Pay Day, 1986			
Post Oaks & Sand Roughs	Post Oaks & Sand Roughs, 1990			Semi-autobiographical
The Sophisticate	Pay Day, 1986			
The Stones of Destiny	Pulp Magazine #1, March 1989			
Sunday in a Small Town	The Howard Collector #11, Spring 1969			
A Touch of Color	Pay Day, 1986			
The Voice of the Mob	Lurid Confessions #1, June 1986			
Wild Water	The Vultures of Whapeton, 1975			

== Other stories ==
Title	First published	Alternative title(s)	Source text	Notes
The Abbey	Fantasy Crossroads #4-5, 1975			Fragment
Aha! or The Mystery of the Queen's Necklace	The Tattler, the Brownwood High School paper, March 1923		"Aha! or The Mystery of the Queen's Necklace" (Wikisource)	
Ambition by Moonlight	The Junto, January 1929	Ambition in the Moonlight		
A Dream	The Howard Collector #14, Spring 1971			Originally untitled
Etched in Ebony	The Junto, September 1929			
Etchings in Ivory	Etchings in Ivory, 1968			
The Ghost in the Doorway	The Howard Collector #11, Spring 1969			
The Gondarian Man	Fantasy Crossroads #6, November 1975			
The Hashish Land	Fantome #1, 1978			
The Last Laugh	Fantasy Crossroads #9, August 1976			
The Last White Man	The Howard Collector #5, Summer 1964			Fragment
Unhand Me, Villain	The Tattler, the Brownwood High School paper, February 1923		"Unhand Me, Villain" (Wikisource)	
Spanish Gold on Devil Horse	The Howard Collector #17, Autumn 1972			

== Essays and articles ==
Title	First published	Alternative title(s)	Source text	Notes
The Beast from the Abyss			"The Beast from the Abyss (Wikisource)	
The Galveston Affair	The Junto, December 1928			
The Ghost of Camp Colorado	The Texaco Star			Sold for $28.26; Public Domain
The Hyborian Age	The Phantagraph, February–November 1936		"The Hyborian Age (Wikisource)	Public Domain
The Ideal Girl	The Tattler, the Brownwood High School paper, January 1925			Public Domain
To a Man Whose Name I Never Knew	The Junto, November 1928			
Kid Dula Due To Be Champion	The Brownwood Bulletin, July 1928			Public Domain
Midnight	The Junto, September 1928		"Midnight" (Wikisource)	Public Domain
More Evidences of the Innate Divinity of Man	The Junto, October 1928			
Them	The Junto, September 1928			
With a Set of Rattlesnake Rattles	Leaves #1, Summer 1937		"With a Set of Rattlesnake Rattles (Wikisource)	Public Domain

== Other fragments ==
- The Atavist (Public Domain)
- Age Lasting Love (First published in La Tombe Du Dragon, 1990. Public Domain)
- The Battling Sailor
- Blue River Blues
- A Boy, a Beehive, and a Chinaman
- The Brand of Satan (Public Domain)
- Circus Charade (Public Domain)
- The Dominant Male (Public Domain)
- The Drawing Card (Public Domain)
- The Drifter (Public Domain)
- A Faithful Servant (Public Domain)
- Fate is the Killer (Public Domain)
- The Feminine of the Species (Public Domain)
- The Ferocious Ape (Public Domain)
- The Fishing Trip (Public Domain)
- Fistic Psychology
- The Folly of Conceit (Public Domain)
- Friends (Public Domain)
- The Funniest Bout (Public Domain)
- The Ghost Behind the Gloves (Public Domain)
- The Ghost of Bald Rock Ranch (Public Domain)
- In His Own Image (Public Domain)
- Incongruity (Public Domain)
- The Influence of the Movies (Public Domain)
- The Ivory Camel (Public Domain)
- The Land of Forgotten Ages (Public Domain)
- The Lion Gate (Public Domain)
- Lobo Volante (Public Domain)
- Man (Public Domain)
- A Man and a Brother (Public Domain)
- A Man of Peace (Public Domain)
- The Man Who Went Back (Public Domain)
- Mr. Dowser Buys a Car (Public Domain)
- Over the Rockies in a Ford (Public Domain)
- Pigskin Scholar (Public Domain)
- The Punch (Public Domain)
- The Recalcitrant (Public Domain)
- The Red Stone (Public Domain)
- The Slayer (Never published. Public Domain)
- A South Sea Storm (Never published. Public Domain)
- The Splendid Brute (Never published. Public Domain)
- Tallyho! (Public Domain)
- Ten Minutes on a Street Corner (Public Domain)
- Through the Ages (Public Domain)
- The Treasure of Henry Morgan (Public Domain)
- A Twentieth-Century Rip Van Winkle (Public Domain)
- A Unique Hat (Public Domain)
- The Weeping Willow
- What the Deuce? (Public Domain)
- The Wheel Turns (Public Domain)
- The White Jade Ring (Public Domain)
- The Wild Man (Public Domain)
- The Wings of the Bat (Public Domain)
- Yellow Laughter (Public Domain)

=== Other untitled stories ===
- "As he approached the two, he swept off his feathered hat..."
- "Better a man should remain in kindly ignorance, than..."
- "Between berserk battle-rages, the black despair of melancholy..."
- "Franey was a fool."
- "From the black, bandit-haunted mountains of Kang..."
- "Help! Help! They're murderin' me!"
- "Huh?" I was so dumbfounded I was clean off..."
- "I", said Cuchulain, "was a man, at least."
- "I'm writing this with a piece of pencil on the backs of old..."
- "It was a strange experience, and I don't expect anyone..."
- "A land of wild, fantastic beauty; of mighty trees..."
- "The lazy quiet of the mid-summer day was shattered..."
- "A man", said my friend Larry Aloysius O'Leary..."
- "The matter seemed so obvious that my only answer..."
- "Maybe it doesn't seem like anything interesting and..."
- "Mike Costigan, writer and self-avowed futilist, gazed..."
- "The next day I was sluggish and inefficient in my work..."
- "Old Man Jacobsen crunched his powerful teeth through..."
- "So I set out up the hill-trail as if on a hunt and..."
- "So there I was..."
- "Spike Morissey was as tough a kid as ever came..."
- "The tale has always been doubted and scoffed at..."
- "that is, the artistry is but a symbol for the thought!"
- "Thure Khan gazed out across the shifting vastness..."
- "Trails led through dense jungle..."
- "Two men were standing in the bazaar at Delhi..."
- "You," said Shifty Griddle, pointing his finger at me..."
- "Joe Rogers had been working the stock markets..."
