= Steve Harrison (character) =

Fictional character created by Robert E. Howard

Steve Harrison is a fictional police detective created by Robert E. Howard. Three stories featuring the character were published as Lord of the Dead, in 1981.

== Stories ==
- "The Black Moon"
- "Fangs of Gold": First published in Strange Detective Stories, February 1934. Alternate title: People of the Serpent. Original text at Wikisource
- "Graveyard Rats": First published in Thrilling Mystery, February 1936. Original text at Wikisource
- "The House of Suspicion"
- "Lord of the Dead": Steve faces Erlik Khan, last Emperor of the Mongols.
- "The Mystery of Tannernoe Lodge"
- "Names in the Black Book": First published in Strange Detective Stories, May 1934. Original text at Wikisource
- "The Silver Heel"
- "The Tomb's Secret": First published in Strange Detective Stories, February 1934. Alternate title: Teeth of Doom. Original text at Wikisource
- "The Voice of Death"
