= The Right Hand of Doom =

The Right Hand of Doom may refer to:

- Hellboy: The Right Hand of Doom, a 2004 story collection featuring Hellboy
- The Right Hand of Doom, a Solomon Kane story by Robert E. Howard first published in the 1968 collection Red Shadows
