= Robert E. Howard bibliography (poems I–O) =

Bibliography

A list of poems by Robert E. Howard (1906–1936), an American writer and poet in early 20th century Texas. His love of poetry came from being read to by his mother at a young age. However, his attempts to make a living by poetry were unsuccessful and he is today most remembered for his short stories and fiction. Nevertheless, Howard wrote hundreds of poems; many were published within his lifetime and the others published after his 1936 suicide.

== Key ==
Title	Lines	Opening line	Place of publication	Publication date	Alternative title(s)	Source text	Notes	References
The title of the poem	#	The text of the first known line in the poem	The book or magazine in which the poem was first published	The date on which the poem was first published	Any alternative titles by which the poem is also known	Links to online texts where available	Further information about the poem	Bibliographic sources
An alternative title for the poem					The main title of the poem			

The lack of information in a column does not necessarily mean that the information does not exist, only that verifiable information is not currently available. For example, the lack of publication information does not necessarily mean that a poem has not been published to date, nor does the lack of a definite note about the public domain indicate that a poem is still under copyright.

This table may be sorted by different columns by clicking on the icon in the appropriate column. Clicking the icon again will alternate between ascending and descending order.

Additional notes

Title/Alternative title: Some poems are known by multiple titles. Alternative titles are shown in the column of the same name. Every effort has been made to list full information at all entries for each title, to save the user time in scrolling. Occasionally, alternative titles appear consecutively, in which case the second entry will follow without additional information, shown in a darker gray on the table. In other cases, some poems were not titled by Howard or the original title has not survived. Some poems have been given tentative titles after Howard's death; this is indicated in the Notes column. Where multiple titles exist, they have been listed alphabetically by their various designations following the word "Untitled." Some pieces of poetry were used by Howard as epigraphs within his stories. Lord (1976) listed these poems under the title of the short story rather than the title of the poem itself, so the poems are listed under those titles as well. With epigraphs, the first publication information given in this table is that of the poem's first printing separated from the story.

Lines: The number of lines in the poem.

Source text: Links given in the Source Text column are to copies of the poem in online libraries (where available). For ease of browsing the table, these links are preceded by a small icon. For example, for poems on Wikisource.

References: Bibliographic references are given in the final column of each row. The exception to this is the Notes column; as notes may come from diverse sources, or from a separate part of one of the main sources, each individual note is followed by its own reference.

== Poetry ==
Title	Lines	Opening line	Place of publication	Publication date	Alternative title(s)	Source text	Notes	References
"I am a Devon oak" (Lord 1976, p. 303)	20	I am a Devon oak	A Rhyme of Salem Town and Other Poems	2002	Devon Oak; Untitled ("I am a Devon oak")		Tentative title^{B} (Lord 1976, p. 303)	Lord 1976, p. 303; Herman 2006, p. 162
"I am an actor ..."	12	I am an actor and have been an actor from birth	A Rhyme of Salem Town and Other Poems	2002	Actor, The; Untitled ("I am an actor ...")		Tentative title^{B} (Lord 1976, p. 300)	Lord 1976, p. 300; Herman 2006, p. 147; Thom, Herman & Woods, § A
I am MAN from the primal, I	7	I am MAN from the primal, I	The Last of the Trunk Och Brev I Urval	Mar 2007	Untitled: I am MAN from the primal, I	Wikisource	Letter:^{K} Tevis Clyde Smith, c. March 1928 (Herman 2006, p. 223); PD^{L}	Herman 2006, p. 223
I am the Spirit of War!	9	I am the Spirit of War!	The Last of the Trunk Och Brev I Urval	Mar 2007	Untitled: I am the Spirit of War!	Wikisource	Letter:^{K} Tevis Clyde Smith, January 30, 1925 (Herman 2006, p. 223); PD^{L}	Herman 2006, p. 223
I Call the Muster of Iron Men		I call the muster of iron men	Argosy All-Story Weekly	July 20, 1929	Untitled: ("I call the muster of iron men")		From an early draft of the short story "Crowd-Horror"; titled with the first line in COLLECTED POETRY	
"I can recall a quiet sky ..."	8	I can recall a quiet sky once more	The Howard Collector #5	Summer 1964	Dawn in Flanders, A; Untitled ("I can recall a quiet sky ...")			Lord 1976, p. 172; Herman 2006, p. 160
"I carved a woman out of marble when"	14	I carved a woman out of marble when	Poet's Scroll	Jan 1929	Flaming Marble; Untitled ("I carved a woman out of marble when")	Wikisource	PD^{L}; Pen name: Patrick Howard^{O} (Herman 2006, p. 168)	Herman 2006, p. 168
"I caught Joan alone upon her bed"	4	I caught Joan alone upon her bed	A Rhyme of Salem Town and Other Poems	2002	Prelude; Untitled ("I caught Joan alone upon her bed")		Tentative title^{B} (Lord 1976, p. 309)	Lord 1976, p. 309; Herman 2006, p. 193
"I cut my teeth on toil and pain"	12	I cut my teeth on toil and pain	The Ghost Ocean and Other Poems of the Supernatural	1982	When the Glaciers Rumbled South; Untitled ("I cut my teeth on toil and pain")		Tentative title^{B} (Lord 1976, p. 313)	Lord 1976, p. 313; Herman 2006, p. 238
I do not sing of a paradise	4	I do not sing of a paradise	The Collected Letters of Robert E. Howard, Volume 1: 1923-1929	Jun 2007	Untitled: ("I do not sing of a paradise")	Wikisource	Letter:^{K} Tevis Clyde Smith, c. January 1928 (Herman 2006, p. 224); PD^{L}	Herman 2006, p. 224
"If life was a thing that money could buy"	2	If life was a thing that money could buy	The Collected Letters of Robert E. Howard, Volume 1: 1923-1929	Jun 2007	Untitled: ("If life was a thing that money could buy")		Letter:^{K} Tevis Clyde Smith, ca. October 1927; contained in the story "The Fastidious Fooey Mancucu"; parody of an old saying whose second line is usually some variant of "The rich would live and the poor would die"	
I hate the man who tells me that I lied	24	I hate the man who tells me that I lied	The Collected Letters of Robert E. Howard, Volume 1: 1923-1929	Jun 2007	Untitled: I hate the man who tells me that I lied	Wikisource	Letter:^{K} Tevis Clyde Smith, c. November 1928 (Herman 2006, p. 224); PD^{L}	Herman 2006, p. 224
"I heard the drum as I went ..."	14	I heard the drum as I went down the street	A Rhyme of Salem Town and Other Poems	2002	Drum, The; Untitled ("I heard the drum as I went ...")		Tentative title^{B} (Lord 1976, p. 303)	Lord 1976, p. 303; Herman 2006, p. 164
I hold all women are a gang of tramps	10	I hold all women are a gang of tramps	The Last of the Trunk Och Brev I Urval	Mar 2007	Untitled: I hold all women are a gang of tramps	Wikisource	PD^{L}	Herman 2006, p. 224
I knocked upon her lattice — soft!	8	I knocked upon her lattice — soft!	Lewd Tales	1987	Untitled: I knocked upon her lattice — soft!		Letter:^{K} Tevis Clyde Smith, c. March 1929 (Herman 2006, p. 224); From:^{T} Songs of Bastards, Act 1, Scene 1	Herman 2006, p. 224
I lay in Yen's opium joint	7	I lay in Yen's opium joint	The Last of the Trunk Och Brev I Urval	Mar 2007	Untitled: I lay in Yen's opium joint	Wikisource	Letter:^{K} Tevis Clyde Smith, January 30, 1925 (Herman 2006, p. 224); PD^{L}	Herman 2006, p. 224
I Praise my Nativity	10	Oh, evil the day that I was born, like a tale that a witch has told	Fantasy Book #23	Mar 1987			Letter:^{K} Tevis Clyde Smith, undated (Herman 2006, p. 175)	Herman 2006, p. 175
"I saw the grass on the hillside bend"	16	I saw the grass on the hillside bend	Weirdbook #12	1977	Dance Macabre; Untitled ("I saw the grass on the hillside bend")		Tentative title^{B} (Lord 1976, p. 302)	Lord 1976, p. 302; Herman 2006, p. 160
"I stand in the streets of the city"	8	I stand in the streets of the city	Night Images	1976	King of the Ages Comes, The; Untitled ("I stand in the streets of the city")		Tentative title^{B} (Lord 1976, p. 307)	Lord 1976, p. 307; Herman 2006, p. 178
I tell you this my friend ...	9	I tell you this my friend ...	The Last of the Trunk Och Brev I Urval	Mar 2007	Untitled: I tell you this my friend ...	Wikisource	Letter:^{K} Tevis Clyde Smith, August 6, 1925 (Herman 2006, p. 224); PD^{L}	Herman 2006, p. 224
"I too have strode those white-paved roads"	4	I too have strode those white-paved roads that run	The Howard Collector #17	Autumn 1972	Roads; Untitled ("I too have strode those white-paved roads")		Originally untitled (Lord 1976, p. 184)	Lord 1976, p. 184; Herman 2006, p. 199
"I was a chief of the Chatagai"	21	I was a chief of the Chatagai	Night Images	1976	Thousand Years Ago, A; Untitled ("I was a chief of the Chatagai")		Tentative title^{B} (Lord 1976, p. 311)	Lord 1976, p. 311; Herman 2006, p. 214
"I was a prince of China, lord of a million spears ..."	18	I was a prince of China, lord of a million spears	Always Comes Evening	1957	Prince and Beggar; Untitled ("I was a prince of China, lord of a million spears ...")		Originally untitled (Lord 1976, p. 182)	Lord 1976, p. 182; Herman 2006, p. 194
"I, was I there"	10	I, was I there	A Rhyme of Salem Town and Other Poems	2002	Was I There?; Untitled ("I, was I there")		Tentative title^{B} (Lord 1976, p. 313)	Lord 1976, p. 313; Herman 2006, p. 237
"I was once, I declare, a grog-shop man"	28	I was once, I declare, a grog-shop man	Shadows of Dreams	1989	Ballad of Beer, A; Untitled ("I was once, I declare, a grog-shop man")		Letter:^{K} Tevis Clyde Smith, c. July 1930 (Herman 2006, p. 152); Originally untitled (Herman 2006, p. 152)	Herman 2006, p. 152; Thom, Herman & Woods, § B
Illusion	26	I stood upon surf-booming cliffs	The Daniel Baker Collegian^{G}	15 March 1926		Wikisource	PD^{L}	Lord 1976, p. 177; Herman 2006, p. 175
I'm more than a man...		I'm more than a man ...	n/a	n/a	Untitled: I'm more than a man ...		From the draft of the story Yellow Laughter (Herman 2006, p. 225); Never published (Herman 2006, p. 225)	Herman 2006, p. 225
In the Ring	47	Over the place the lights go out	Robert E. Howard's Fight Magazine #4	Oct 1996	Untitled("Over the place the lights go out")		Tentative title^{B} (Lord 1976, p. 307)	Lord 1976, p. 307; Herman 2006, p. 175
Incident of the Muscovy-Turkish War, An	14	Many were slaughtered in that final charge	A Rhyme of Salem Town and Other Poems	2002				Lord 1976, p. 307; Herman 2006, p. 175
Insomnia			n/a	n/a			Lost^{U}	Thom, Herman & Woods, § C
Invective	4	There burns in me no honeyed drop of love	Always Comes Evening	1957	Untitled ("There burns in me ...")	"Invective"		Lord 1976, p. 177; Herman 2006, p. 175
Invocation	14	Break down the world and mold it once again!	n/a	n/a			Part 5 of 5 in the Black Dawn cycle (Herman 2006, pp. 154, 175); Never published separately (Herman 2006, p. 175)	Herman 2006, p. 175
The Invocation	4	Baal, lord Baal, of the ebon throne	Yesteryear #4	Oct 1989			Letter:^{K} Tevis Clyde Smith, c. February 1929 (Herman 2006, p. 187); First poem in the cycle "The Mysteries"	Herman 2006, p. 187
Iron Harp, The [poem cycle]	134	1. The blind black shadows reach inhuman arms / 2. Now in the gloom the pulsing drums repeat / 3. Ten million years beyond the sweep of Time / 4. The great black tower rose to split the stars / 5. A roar of battle thundered in the hills	The Last of the Trunk Och Brev I Urval	Mar 2007	Echoing Shadows; Voices of the Night		A group of five poems: "The Voices Waken Memory" (24 lines); "Babel" (19 lines); "Laughter in the Gulfs" (18 lines); "Moon Shame" (34 lines); and "A Crown for a King" (39 lines); Letter:^{K} Tevis Clyde Smith, undated, beginning "The Seeker thrust ..."; Does NOT include the individual poem "The Iron Harp," which is, confusingly, the fourth poem in the BLACK DAWN cycle!	Lord 1976, p. 174; Herman 2006, p. 166
Iron Harp, The (2)^{N}	32	They sell brown men for gold in Zanzibar	n/a	n/a			Part 4 of 5 in the Black Dawn cycle—NOT part of the "Iron Harp" poem cycle! (Herman 2006, pp. 154, 175–176); Never published separately (Herman 2006, pp. 175–176)	Herman 2006, pp. 175–176
The iron harp that Adam christened Life	18	The iron harp that Adam christened Life	The Collected Letters of Robert E. Howard, Volume 1: 1923-1929	Jun 2007	Untitled: The iron harp that Adam christened Life	Wikisource	Letter:^{K} Tevis Clyde Smith, c. April 1929 (Herman 2006, p. 225); PD^{L}	Herman 2006, p. 225
Isle of Hy-Brasil, The	52	There's a far, lone island in the dim, red West	The Ghost Ocean and Other Poems of the Supernatural	1982	Hy-Brasil		Shares lines with Ships (Lord 1976, p. 307)	Lord 1976, p. 307; Herman 2006, p. 176
Ivory in the Night	8	Maidens of star and of moon	The Last of the Trunk Och Brev I Urval	Mar 2007		Wikisource	Letter:^{K} Tevis Clyde Smith, c. March 1928 (Herman 2006, p. 176); PD^{L}	Herman 2006, p. 176
Jack Dempsey	24	Through the California mountains	The Right Hook, vol. 1, #2^{I}	1925		Wikisource	PD^{L}	Herman 2006, p. 176
Jackal, The	15	Lean is the life that the jackal leads	Omniumgathum	1976				Lord 1976, p. 307; Herman 2006, p. 176
"A jackal laughed from a thicket still ..."	24	A jackal laughed from a thicket still, the stars were haggard pale	Witchcraft & Sorcery	May 1971	Flight; Untitled ("A jackal laughed from a thicket still ...")		Letter:^{K} Tevis Clyde Smith, c. September 1927, earlier, shorter version (Herman 2006, p. 168)	Lord 1976, p. 175; Herman 2006, p. 168
James J. Jeffries			n/a	n/a			Lost^{U}	Thom, Herman & Woods, § C
Jimmy Barry			n/a	n/a			Lost^{U}	Thom, Herman & Woods, § C
Joe Gans			n/a	n/a			Lost^{U}	Thom, Herman & Woods, § C
John Brown	24	You stole niggers, John Brown	Shadows of Dreams	1989			Letter:^{K} Tevis Clyde Smith, c. May 1932 (Herman 2006, p. 176);the first of "Three Sketches"	Herman 2006, p. 176
John Kelley	30	I hesitate to name your name	The Collected Letters of Robert E. Howard, Volume 2: 1930-1932	Oct 2007		Wikisource	Letter:^{K} Tevis Clyde Smith, c. May 1932 (Herman 2006, p. 176); PD^{L}; the third of "Three Sketches"	Herman 2006, p. 176
John L. Sullivan	36	Bellowing, blustering, old John L.	The Right Hook, vol. 1, #2^{I}	1925		Wikisource		Herman 2006, p. 176
John Ringold	14	There was a land of which he never spoke	The Howard Collector #5	Summer 1964				Lord 1976, p. 178; Herman 2006, p. 176
The Jubilee	8	There was ham and lamb	The Collected Letters of Robert E. Howard, Volume 1: 1923-1929	Jun 2007	Gilhooley's Supper Party;		Mnemonic reconstruction^{V} of "Gilhooley's Supper Party"; Letter:^{K} Robert W. Gordon, March 17, 1927; NOT INCLUDED IN COLLECTED POETRY	
Ju-ju Doom	14	As a great spider grows to monstrous girth	A Rhyme of Salem Town and Other Poems	2002	Untitled ("As a great spider grows to monstrous girth")		Tentative title^{B} (Lord 1976, p. 307)	Lord 1976, p. 307; Herman 2006, p. 176
Kabrane the Greek			n/a	n/a	THE HOUSE OF HELL		Lost^{U}; the two titles are listed as alternatives in the Otis Adelbert Kline agency's list of Howard poems still unaccounted for	Thom, Herman & Woods, § C
Kandahar			n/a	n/a			Lost^{U}	Thom, Herman & Woods, § C
Keep women, thrones and kingly lands	4	Keep women, thrones and kingly lands	The Collected Letters of Robert E. Howard, Volume 1: 1923-1929	Jun 2007	Untitled: Keep women, thrones and kingly lands	Wikisource	Letter:^{K} Tevis Clyde Smith, c. January 1928 (Herman 2006, p. 225); PD^{L}	Herman 2006, p. 225
Kelly the Conjure-man	4	There are strange tales told when the full moon shines	Echoes From An Iron Harp^{A}	1972^{A}			Epigraph:^{S} Kelly the Conjure-man (Lord 1976, p. 204)	Lord 1976, p. 204; Herman 2006, p. 176
Keresa, Keresita	24	Keresa, Keresita	Shadows of Dreams	1989	Untitled ("Keresa, Keresita")		Letter:^{K} Tevis Clyde Smith, c. March 1928 (Herman 2006, p. 177)	Herman 2006, p. 177
Kid Lavigne is Dead	28	Hang up the battered gloves; Lavigne is dead	The Ring	Jun 1928		Wikisource	PD^{L}	Lord 1976, p. 178; Herman 2006, p. 177
King Alfred Rides Again	20	I marched with Alfred when he thundered forth	Poet's Scroll	Apr 1929	Dreaming on Downs	Wikisource	Tentative title^{B} (Lord 1976, p. 307)	Lord 1976, p. 307; Herman 2006, p. 177
King and the Mallet, The	28	Long golden-yellow banners break the sky	The Junto^{H}	Jul 1929				Lord 1976, p. 307; Herman 2006, p. 177
King and the Oak, The	24	Before the shadows slew the sun the kites were soaring free	Weird Tales	Feb 1939		"The King and the Oak"	There are two versions of this poem, the published one and a slightly longer draft version (Herman 2006, p. 177)	Lord 1976, p. 178; Herman 2006, p. 177
King Bahthur's Court	106	When the clamor of the city ...	The Collected Letters Of Robert E. Howard, Volume 3: 1933–1936	n/a^{A}	2008		A play, written entirely in verse	Herman 2006, p. 177
King Kelka Rode From Komahar			n/a	n/a			Lost^{U}	Thom, Herman & Woods, § C
King of the Ages Comes, The	8	I stand in the streets of the city	Night Images	1976	Untitled ("I stand in the streets of the city")		Tentative title^{B} (Lord 1976, p. 307)	Lord 1976, p. 307; Herman 2006, p. 178
King of the Sea	14	Neptune was king of old	A Rhyme of Salem Town and Other Poems	2002				Lord 1976, p. 307; Herman 2006, p. 178
King of Trade, The	8	There ere the mighty hosts might clash their swords	A Rhyme of Salem Town and Other Poems	2002			Incomplete, only the final eight lines survive (Lord 1976, p. 307)/(Herman 2006, p. 178)	Lord 1976, p. 307; Herman 2006, p. 178
Kings of the Night	4	The Caesar lolled on his ivory throne	Always Comes Evening^{A}	1957^{A}	Song of Bran, The		Epigraph:^{S} Kings of the Night (Lord 1976, p. 204)	Lord 1976, p. 204; Herman 2006, pp. 208, 178
Kiowa's Tale, The	28	All day I lay with the sun at my back	Fantasy Crosswinds #1	1 November 1974				Lord 1976, p. 307; Herman 2006, p. 178
Kissing of Sal Snooboo, The	20	A bunch of girls were whooping it up	The Tattler^{D}	6 January 1925		Wikisource	A parody of "The Shooting of Dan McGrew" by Robert W. Service (Lord 1976, p. 178)/(Herman 2006, p. 178); PD^{L}	Lord 1976, p. 178; Herman 2006, p. 178
Kolumbar, Piper of Sadness			n/a	n/a			Lost^{U}	Thom, Herman & Woods, § C
Krakorum	4	A thousand years ago great Genghis reigned	A Rhyme of Salem Town and Other Poems	2002	Untitled ("A thousand years ago great Genghis reigned")		Tentative title^{B} (Lord 1976, p. 305); An early work^{C} (Lord 1976, p. 305); An introduction by Howard states that he was 17 when he wrote this poem (Herman 2006, p. 178)	Lord 1976, p. 305; Herman 2006, p. 178
Kublai Khan	8	Who hath heard of Kublai Khan	The Golden Caliph^{I} The Last Celt	1922/1923; 1976			Conflict:^{M} Lord (1976, p. 178), The Last Celt, 1976/Herman (2006, p. 178), The Golden Caliph, 1922/23; An early work^{C} (Lord 1976, p. 178)	Lord 1976, p. 178; Herman 2006, p. 178
Ladder of Life, The	4	Life is ladder of cynical years	A Rhyme of Salem Town and Other Poems	2002	Untitled ("Life is a ladder ...")		Tentative title^{B} (Lord 1976, p. 305)	Lord 1976, p. 305; Herman 2006, p. 178
Lady's Chamber, A	17	Orchid, jasmine and heliotrope	American Poet	Apr 1929		Wikisource	Pen name: Patrick Howard^{O} (Lord 1976, p. 169)/(Herman 2006, p. 178); PD^{L}	Lord 1976, p. 169; Herman 2006, p. 178
Lalun of Lucknow			n/a	n/a			Lost^{U}	Thom, Herman & Woods, § C
Lament For Jesse James	4	It wuz on a starry night, in the month of July	The Howard Collector #6	Spring 1965	Alternate title: Untitled ("It wuz on a starry night, in the month of July ..."); Title is Howard's only to the extent that it is referred to thus in the text.		A barroom song taken from the Sonora Kid story "Knife, Bullet and Noose" (aka "Knife, Gun and Noose"), Variation on a very common theme, probably with adjustments by Howard. Probably never published separately. ||	
The Land of A Grey Dawn			n/a	n/a			Lost^{U}	Thom, Herman & Woods, § C
Land of Mystery, The	15	Ancient of nations as the pyramid	n/a	n/a			Epigraph:^{S} The Land of Mystery (Lord 1976, p. 315); Never published separately (Herman 2006, p. 179)	Lord 1976, p. 315; Herman 2006, p. 179
Land of the Pioneer	8	The wild bees hum in the tangled vines	A Rhyme of Salem Town and Other Poems	2002	Untitled ("The wild bees hum ...")		Tentative title^{B} (Lord 1976, p. 305); An early work^{C} (Lord 1976, p. 305)	Lord 1976, p. 305; Herman 2006, p. 179
Last Day, The	14	Hinged in the brooding west a black sun hung	Weird Tales	Mar 1932			Similar to The Last Hour (Lord 1976, p. 178); Letter:^{K} Tevis Clyde Smith, c. November 1931 (Herman 2006, p. 179)	Lord 1976, p. 178; Herman 2006, p. 179
Last Hour, The	14	Hinged in the brooding west a black sun hung	Weird Tales	Jun 1938		"The Last Hour"	Similar to The Last Day (Lord 1976, p. 179); Fifth poem of five from the Sonnets Out of Bedlam cycle; (Herman 2006, p. 179)	Lord 1976, p. 179; Herman 2006, p. 179
The Last Ride (aka "Boot Hill Payoff") Contains an embedded mnemonic reconstruction of "Brady" (q.v.). The story is a collaboration with Chandler Whipple (Robert Enders Allen), who wrote chapters 1–6, then turned it over to Howard to finish.
Last Words He Heard, The	14	The chariots were chanting	Shadows of Dreams	1989	Untitled ("The chariots were chanting ...")		Letter:^{K} Tevis Clyde Smith, c. December 1928 (Herman 2006, p. 179)	Herman 2006, p. 179
Laughter	2	Laughter's the lure of the gods; therefore must ye laugh	The Last of the Trunk Och Brev I Urval	Mar 2007		Wikisource	Letter:^{K} Tevis Clyde Smith, April 14, 1926 (Herman 2006, p. 179); PD^{L}	Herman 2006, p. 179
Laughter in the Gulfs	18	Ten million miles beyond the sweep of Time	Always Comes Evening	1957	An Echo of Laughter in the Gulfs; Voices of the Night	"Laughter in the Gulfs"	Poem 3 of the Voices of the Night cycle (Herman 2006, p. 179); Letter:^{K} Tevis Clyde Smith, undated (Herman 2006, p. 179)	Lord 1976, p. 179; Herman 2006, p. 179
Laughter in the Night			n/a	n/a			Lost^{U}	Thom, Herman & Woods, § C
Legacy of Tubal-Cain, The	10	"No more!" they swear; I laugh to hear them speak	The Howard Collector #18	Autumn 1973	Untitled ("'No more!' they swear ...")		Originally untitled (Lord 1976, p. 179)	Lord 1976, p. 179; Herman 2006, p. 180
Legend	8 lines, plus a 142-word prose introduction	Against the blood red moon a tower stands	The Last of the Trunk Och Brev I Urval	Mar 2007	Untitled: Against the blood red moon a tower stands	Wikisource	Letter:^{K} Tevis Clyde Smith, c. Aug/Sep 1927 (Herman 2006, p. 218); PD^{L}	Herman 2006, p. 218
Legend, A	14	I was a swordsman in the Pharaoh's days	Writer of the Dark	1986				Lord 1976, p. 305; Herman 2006, p. 180
Legend of Faring Town, A	28	Her house, a moulting buzzard on the Hill	Verses in Ebony	1975	A Rhyme of Faring Town			Lord 1976, p. 305; Herman 2006, p. 180; Howard 2008, p. x
L'Envoi (1)^{N}	12	Live like a wolf then	The Right Hook,^{I} vol. 1, #1	Spring 1925				Herman 2006, p. 180
L'Envoi (2)^{N}	8	Harlots and choir girls	The Right Hook,^{I} vol. 1, #2	1925				Herman 2006, p. 180
L'Envoi (3)^{N}	7	Twilight striding o'er the mountain	The Right Hook,^{I} vol. 1, #3	1925	Twilight Striding O'er the Mountain			Herman 2006, p. 180
L'Envoi (4)^{N}	12	Now flapper ridden					From KING BAHTHUR'S COURT, a play written entirely in verse in an undated letter to Tevis Clyde Smith	Herman 2006, p. 180
Lesbia (1)^{N}	56	From whence this grim desire?	The Last of the Trunk Och Brev I Urval	Mar 2007		Wikisource	Earlier version than (2) (Herman 2006, p. 180); Letter:^{K} Tevis Clyde Smith, c. June 1928 (Herman 2006, p. 180); PD^{L}; the first two appearances were shorter by a few lines, and a couple words different	Lord 1976, p. 305; Herman 2006, p. 180
Lesbia (2)^{N}	56	From whence this grim desire?	Desire and Other Erotic Poems	1989			Later version than (1) (Herman 2006, p. 180); the first two appearances were shorter by a few lines, and a couple words different	Herman 2006, p. 180
Let it rest with the ages mysteries	4	Let it rest with the ages mysteries	The Collected Letters of Robert E. Howard, Volume 2: 1930-1932	Oct 2007	Untitled: Let it rest with the ages mysteries		Letter:^{K} Tevis Clyde Smith, c. November 1931 (Herman 2006, p. 225); Not actually written by Howard, but a quote from WHERE CANNIKANS CLINKED by Charles Nichols Webb, which, to confuse matters, Robert Louis Stevenson also cited in a poem	Herman 2006, p. 225
"Let me dream by a silver stream"	4	Let me dream by a silver stream	The Collected Letters of Robert E. Howard, Volume 3: 1933-1936	2008	Untitled: ("Let me dream by a silver stream")		Letter:^{K} Tevis Clyde Smith, undated	Did NOT get included in the first edition of COLLECTED POETRY
Let me live as I was born to live	4	Let me live as I was born to live	The Collected Letters of Robert E. Howard, Volume 1: 1923-1929	Jun 2007	Untitled: Let me live as I was born to live	Wikisource	Letter:^{K} Tevis Clyde Smith, c. November 1928 (Herman 2006, p. 225); PD^{L}	Herman 2006, p. 225
Let the Gods Die	16	Shatter the shrines and let the idols fall	Weirdbook #10	1976				Lord 1976, p. 305; Herman 2006, p. 180
Let us up in the hills ...		Let us up in the hills ...	Lewd Tales	1987	Untitled: Let us up in the hills ...		Letter:^{K} Tevis Clyde Smith, c. March 1929 (Herman 2006, p. 225); From:^{T} Songs of Bastards, Act 1, Scene 2	Herman 2006, p. 225
Libertine	4	I set my soul to a wild lute	The Last of the Trunk Och Brev I Urval	Mar 2007		Wikisource	Letter:^{K} Tevis Clyde Smith, June 23, 1926 (Herman 2006, p. 179); PD^{L}	Herman 2006, p. 180
Lies, The	23	Nothing from us can you gain, say the Lies	A Rhyme of Salem Town and Other Poems	2002				Lord 1976, p. 305; Herman 2006, p. 180
Life (1)^{N}	14	About me rise the primal mists	The Collected Letters of Robert E. Howard, Volume 1: 1923-1929	Jun 2007			Letter:^{K} Tevis Clyde Smith, c. January 1928 (Herman 2006, p. 181); PD^{L}	Herman 2006, p. 181
Life (2)^{N}	24	They bruised my soul with a proverb	The Howard Collector #18	Autumn 1973	Youth Spoke - Not in Anger	Wikisource	Letter:^{K} R. H. Barlow, June 14, 1934 (Herman 2006, p. 181)	Lord 1976, p. 179; Herman 2006, p. 181
Life is a cynical, romantic pig	5	Life is a cynical, romantic pig	The Collected Letters of Robert E. Howard, Volume 2: 1930-1932	Oct 2007	Untitled: Life is a cynical, romantic pig	Wikisource	Letter:^{K} Tevis Clyde Smith, c. February 1930 (Herman 2006, p. 225); PD^{L}	Herman 2006, p. 225
"Life is a ladder ..."	4	Life is ladder of cynical years	A Rhyme of Salem Town and Other Poems	2002	Ladder of Life, The; Untitled ("Life is a ladder ...")		Tentative title^{B} (Lord 1976, p. 305)	Lord 1976, p. 305; Herman 2006, p. 178
Life is a lot of hooey	4	Life is a lot of hooey	Lewd Tales	1987	Untitled: Life is a lot of hooey		Letter:^{K} Tevis Clyde Smith, c. March 1929 (Herman 2006, p. 225); From:^{T} Songs of Bastards, Act 2, Scene 1	Herman 2006, p. 225
Life is the same ..."	5	Life is the same, yet of many phases	Unaussprechlichen Kulten #2	Jul 1992	Phases of Life, The; Untitled ("Life is the same ...")		Tentative title^{B} (Lord 1976, p. 308); French^{P} (Herman 2006, p. 192)	Lord 1976, p. 308; Herman 2006, p. 192
Lilith	16	They hurled me from the mire	The Ghost Ocean and Other Poems of the Supernatural	1982			Letter:^{K} Tevis Clyde Smith, c. October 1927 (Herman 2006, p. 181)	Lord 1976, p. 305; Herman 2006, p. 181
Limericks to Spank By	15	There was a young girl from Siberia	Desire and Other Erotic Poems	1989	Untitled ("There was a young girl from Siberia")		Tentative title^{B} (Lord 1976, p. 305); Three 5-line limericks (Herman 2006, p. 181)	Lord 1976, p. 305; Herman 2006, p. 181
Lines to G. B. Shaw	16	Oh, G.B.S., oh, G.B.S	The Last of the Trunk Och Brev I Urval	Mar 2007		Wikisource	Letter:^{K} Tevis Clyde Smith, c. November 1932 (Herman 2006, p. 181); PD^{L}	Herman 2006, p. 181
Lines Written in the Realization That I Must Die	24	The Black Door gapes and the Black Wall rises	Weird Tales	Aug 1938		"Lines Written in the Realization That I Must Die"		Lord 1976, p. 179; Herman 2006, p. 181
Lion of Tiberias, The	4	The rider on the wind with stars in his hair	Echoes From An Iron Harp^{A}	1972^{A}			Epigraph:^{S} The Lion of Tiberias (Lord 1976, p. 204)	Lord 1976, p. 204; Herman 2006, p. 181
Listlessness			n/a	n/a			Lost^{U}	Thom, Herman & Woods, § C
Little Bell of Brass	23	Tingle, jungle, dingle, tingle, hear my brazen tones	A Rhyme of Salem Town and Other Poems	2002	Untitled ("Tingle, jingle, dingle, tingle ...")		Tentative title^{B} (Lord 1976, p. 305)	Lord 1976, p. 305; Herman 2006, p. 182
Little Brown Man of Nippon	36	Little brown man of Nippon who apes the ways of the West	A Rhyme of Salem Town and Other Poems	2002	Untitled ("Little brown man from Nippon ...")		Tentative title^{B} (Lord 1976, p. 305); Letter:^{K} Tevis Clyde Smith, c. April 1932 (Herman 2006, p. 182)	Lord 1976, p. 305; Herman 2006, p. 182
Living Marble			n/a	n/a			Lost^{U}	Thom, Herman & Woods, § C
Lizzen my children and you shall be told	6	Lizzen my children and you shall be told	Robert E. Howard: Selected Letters: 1923-1930	Oct 1989	Untitled: Lizzen my children and you shall be told		Letter:^{K} Tevis Clyde Smith, c. September 1931 (Herman 2006, p. 226)	Herman 2006, p. 226
Long Ago (1)			Writer of the Dark	1986			Somewhat different from version 2; last line is "Saw you, lighting with surprize."	
Long Ago (2)	14	Long ago, long ago	Writer of the Dark	1986			Somewhat different from version 1; last line is "Ah, the rose in your dark hair."	Lord 1976, p. 305; Herman 2006, p. 182
"Long ere Priapus ..."	14	Long ere Priapus pranced through groves Arcadian sunlight kissed	Always Comes Evening	1957	Gods of Easter Island, The; Untitled ("Long ere Priapus ...")	"The Gods of Easter Island"	Originally untitled (Lord 1976, p. 176)	Lord 1976, p. 176; Herman 2006, p. 171
"Long were the years ..."	22	Long were the years, lifelong and deathly-bare	Shadows of Dreams	1989	Ecstasy of Desolation, The; Untitled ("Long were the years, life-long and deathly-bare. ...")		Letter:^{K} Tevis Clyde Smith, c. October 1928 (Herman 2006, p. 166)	Herman 2006, p. 166
Longfellow Revised	12	Tell me not in senseless numbers	A Rhyme of Salem Town and Other Poems	2002				Lord 1976, p. 305; Herman 2006, p. 182
Longing			n/a	n/a			Lost^{U}	Thom, Herman & Woods, § C
The Long Trail			n/a	n/a			Lost^{U}	Thom, Herman & Woods, § C
Lost Altars	4	Dust on column and carven frieze	Wayfarer #4	1969				Lord 1976, p. 179; Herman 2006, p. 182
Lost Antiquity			n/a	n/a			Lost^{U}	Thom, Herman & Woods, § C
Lost Galley, The	28	The sun was brazen in the sky	Singers in the Shadows	1970				Lord 1976, p. 179; Herman 2006, p. 182
Lost Mine, The					The Lost San Saba Mine			Lord 1976, p. 305; Herman 2006, p. 182
Lost San Saba Mine, The	60	Under the grim San Saba hills	A Rhyme of Salem Town and Other Poems	2002	The Lost Mine; Untitled: ("Under the grim San Saba hills")		Letter:^{K} H. P. Lovecraft, April 23, 1933 (Herman 2006, p. 182)	Lord 1976, p. 305; Herman 2006, p. 182
Love	14	I have felt your lips on mine	Shadows of Dreams	1989			Letter:^{K} Tevis Clyde Smith, c. January 1928 (Herman 2006, p. 182)	Herman 2006, p. 182
Love is singing soft and low	4	Love is singing soft and low	The Last of the Trunk Och Brev I Urval	Mar 2007	Untitled: Love is singing soft and low	Wikisource	Letter:^{K} Tevis Clyde Smith, c. December 1928 (Herman 2006, p. 226); PD^{L}	Herman 2006, p. 226
Love's Young Dream	28	I saw the evil red light gleam	Shadows of Dreams	1989				Herman 2006, p. 182
Lunacy Chant	32	Hear the brazen bugles rattle	A Rhyme of Salem Town and Other Poems	2002				Lord 1976, p. 305; Herman 2006, p. 182
Lust	12	I am a golden lure	The Last of the Trunk Och Brev I Urval	Mar 2007		Wikisource	Letter:^{K} Tevis Clyde Smith, June 23, 1926 (Herman 2006, p. 182); PD^{L}	Herman 2006, p. 182
Mad Meg Gill	44	I found and altar in a misty land	Up John Kane! and Other Poems	1977				Lord 1976, p. 305; Herman 2006, p. 183
Madame Goose's Rhymes	41	Hark, hark, the jackals bark	Fantasy Crossroads #7	Feb 1976	Untitled ("Hark, hark, the jackals bark ...)		Tentative title^{B} (Lord 1976, p. 306)	Lord 1976, p. 306; Herman 2006, p. 183
Madhouse Ballads			n/a	n/a			Lost^{U}	Thom, Herman & Woods, § C
Madness of Cormac, The	15	Lock your arm of iron	The Last of the Trunk Och Brev I Urval	Mar 2007		Wikisource	Letter:^{K} Tevis Clyde Smith, undated (Herman 2006, p. 183); PD^{L}	Herman 2006, p. 183
Mahomet		Mahomet! Man of Mecca!	A Rhyme of Salem Town and Other Poems	2002	Untitled ("Mahomet! Man of Mecca!")			Herman 2006, p. 183
Maiden of Kercheezer, The	20	She was snoozing on her sweezer	The Progress^{J}	1 February 1924		Wikisource	PD^{L}	Herman 2006, p. 183
Man, A	16	I tore a pine from the mountain crag	Raucher Sand und Wilde Eichen	1993			Letter:^{K} Tevis Clyde Smith, c. January 1928 (Herman 2006, p. 183); German^{P} (Herman 2006, p. 183)	Herman 2006, p. 183
Man Am I	18	Man am I, and less than a beast, man, and more than a god	The Ghost Ocean and Other Poems of the Supernatural	1982				Lord 1976, p. 306; Herman 2006, p. 183
The Man in the Myth			n/a	n/a			Lost^{U}; REH sent a copy of this poem to H. P. Lovecraft, who complimented it in a reply; the copy of the poem sent with the letter is also gone	Thom, Herman & Woods, § C
Man, The Master	10	I saw a man going down a long trail	Robert E. Howard Foundation Newsletter Volume 5 Number 3	Fall 2011	Song at Midnight (2) (SPURIOUS?)	Wikisource	PD^{L} Alternative only mentioned in Herman (2006, p. 183)	Lord 1976, p. 306; Herman 2006, p. 183
Mankind	72	The world has changed	A Rhyme of Salem Town and Other Poems	2002	Untitled ("The world has changed")		Tentative title^{B} (Lord 1976, p. 306); An early work^{C} (Lord 1976, p. 306)	Lord 1976, p. 306; Herman 2006, p. 183
Many fell at the grog-shop wall	2	Many fell at the grog-shop wall	Robert E. Howard: Selected Letters: 1923-1930	Oct 1989	Untitled: Many fell at the grog-shop wall		Letter:^{K} Tevis Clyde Smith, c. November 1931 (Herman 2006, p. 226)	Herman 2006, p. 226
Marching Song of Connacht, The	18	The men of the East are decked in steel	The Howard Collector #16	Spring 1972			Letter:^{K} Tevis Clyde Smith, c. May 1930 (Herman 2006, p. 183)	The version in the letter to TCS was fourteen lines long, later expanded to 18, and revised somewhat. Lord 1976, p. 180; Herman 2006, p. 183
Marching Song of Connacht, The	14	The men of the East are decked in steel						
Mark of the Beast	24	Kissing the lips of the morning	Weirdbook #9	1975	After a Flaming Night		This poem is at the start of Act II, Scene ii of "Songs of Bastards"; From a letter to Tevis Clyde Smith, ca. March 1929	Lord 1976, p. 300; Herman 2006, p. 148; Thom, Herman & Woods, § A
Martin Luther			n/a	n/a			Lost^{U}	Thom, Herman & Woods, § C
Master-Drum, The	27	The Master beat on his master-drum	Night Images	1976	Untitled ("The Master beat on his master-drum")		Tentative title^{B} (Lord 1976, p. 306)	Lord 1976, p. 306; Herman 2006, p. 184
"Master beat on his master-drum, The"								
Match a toad with a far-winged hawk	58	Match a toad with a far-winged hawk	The Last of the Trunk Och Brev I Urval	Mar 2007	Untitled: Match a toad with a far-winged hawk	Wikisource	Letter:^{K} Tevis Clyde Smith, c. undated (Herman 2006, p. 226); PD^{L}	Herman 2006, p. 226
Mate of the Sea	28	The stars beat up from the shadowy sea	Always Comes Evening	1957	The Heart of the Sea's Desire	"The Heart of the Sea's Desire"	Title created by Dale Hart for an untitled version but another draft was later found with the title Mate of the Sea (Herman 2006, p. 173)	Lord 1976, p. 180; Herman 2006, p. 184
Medallions in the Moon	(331 words)	There is a gate whose portals are of opal and ivory, and to this gate I went one silent twilight ...	Etchings in Ivory (Chapbook)	1968			Third "prose poem" in the Etchings in Ivory cycle	
Memories (1)^{N}	24	I rose in the path of a hurtling dawn and I heard the ocean say	Shangri L'Affaires	1 April 1968				Lord 1976, p. 180; Herman 2006, p. 184
Memories (2)^{N}	16	Shall we remember, friend of the morning	Fantasy Tales	Autumn 1988			Letter:^{K} Tevis Clyde Smith, c. October 1927 (Herman 2006, p. 184); British^{P} (Herman 2006, p. 184)	Herman 2006, p. 184
Memories of Alfred	18	Here in old time King Alfred broke the Danes	The Ghost Ocean and Other Poems of the Supernatural	1982			Tentative title^{B} (Lord 1976, p. 306)	Lord 1976, p. 306; Herman 2006, p. 184
Men are toys on a godling's string ...	4	Men are toys on a godling's string ...	Lewd Tales	1987	Untitled: Men are toys on a godling's string		Letter:^{K} Tevis Clyde Smith, c. March 1929 (Herman 2006, p. 226); From:^{T} Songs of Bastards	Herman 2006, p. 226
Men Build Them Houses	56	Men build them houses on the street	Verses in Ebony	1975				Lord 1976, p. 306; Herman 2006, p. 184
"Men I have slain with naked steel"	24	Men I have slain with naked steel	A Rhyme of Salem Town and Other Poems	2002	Sword of Lal Singh, The; Untitled (Men I have slain with naked steel)		Tentative title^{B} (Lord 1976, p. 311); An early work^{C} (Lord 1976, p. 311)	Lord 1976, p. 311; Herman 2006, p. 212
Men of the Shadows	34	From the dim red dawn of Creation	Always Comes Evening^{A}	1957^{A}	Untitled ("From the dim red dawn of Creation")	"Men of the Shadows"	From:^{T} Men of the Shadows (Lord 1976, p. 180); Originally untitled (Lord 1976, p. 180)	Lord 1976, p. 180; Herman 2006, p. 184
"Men say my years are few; yet I am old"	20	Men say my years are few; yet I am old	Science-Fantasy Correspondent #1	Dec 1975	Guise of Youth, The; Untitled ("Men say my years ...")		Tentative title^{B} (Lord 1976, p. 307)	Lord 1976, p. 307; Herman 2006, p. 172
Men That Walk with Satan	24	The men that walk with Satan, they have forgot their birth	Singers in the Shadows	1970				Lord 1976, p. 180; Herman 2006, p. 184
The Mermaid	5 7-line verses and a 6-line chorus repeated after each one	The first came up / Was a little cabin boy	The Collected Letters of Robert E. Howard, Volume 1: 1923-1929	Jun 2007	Oh, The Stormy Winds; Untitled: ("The first came up / Was a little cabin boy ...")	https://www.youtube.com/watch?v=BcAPJ77WfCs	Mnemonic reconstruction^{V} of an old folk song Letter:^{K} Robert W. Gordon, February 4, 1925; NOT INCLUDED IN COLLECTED POETRY	
A Mexican Girl			n/a	n/a			Lost^{U}	Thom, Herman & Woods, § C
Mick in Israel, A	32	Old King Saul was a bold old scut	The Last of the Trunk Och Brev I Urval	Mar 2007		Wikisource	Letter:^{K} Tevis Clyde Smith, c. November 1932 (Herman 2006, p. 184); PD^{L}	Herman 2006, p. 184
Mihiragula	24	Out of the East the stark winds rise	A Rhyme of Salem Town and Other Poems	2002			Letter:^{K} Harold Preece, c. October–November 1930 (Herman 2006, p. 185)	Lord 1976, p. 306; Herman 2006, p. 185
Mine But to Serve	91	The moonlight glimmered white across the sands	A Rhyme of Salem Town and Other Poems	2002	Untitled ("The moonlight glimmered white ...")		Tentative title^{B} (Lord 1976, p. 306)	Lord 1976, p. 306; Herman 2006, p. 185
Mingle my dust with the burning brand	12	Mingle my dust with the burning brand	The Collected Letters of Robert E. Howard, Volume 1: 1923-1929	Jun 2007	Untitled: Mingle my dust with the burning brand	Wikisource	Letter:^{K} Tevis Clyde Smith, c. August 28, 1925 (Herman 2006, p. 226); PD^{L}	Herman 2006, p. 226
Miser's Gold	14	"Nay, have no fear. The man was blind," said she	Fantasy Crossroads #8	May 1976		Wikisource		Lord 1976, p. 306; Herman 2006, p. 185
Mississippi Gals	30 lines—one missing from source	Come all you Mississippi girls and listen to my noise ...	The Collected Letters of Robert E. Howard, Volume 1: 1923-1929	Jun 2007			Mnemonic reconstruction^{V}; virtually identical to original; Letter:^{K} Robert W. Gordon, March 17, 1927; NOT INCLUDED IN COLLECTED POETRY	
"Mist and madness and mockery rule"	4	Mist and madness and mockery rule	THE COLLECTED LETTERS OF ROBERT E. HOWARD, VOLUME 2: 1930–1932	2007	Untitled: ("Mist and madness and mockery rule")		Letter:^{K} From a letter to Tevis Clyde Smith, ca. May 1930	INADVERTENTLY LEFT OUT OF COLLECTED POETRY
Misty Sea, A	6	There is a misty sea beneath the earth	A Rhyme of Salem Town and Other Poems	2002	Untitled ("There is a misty sea ...")		Tentative title^{B} (Lord 1976, p. 306)	Lord 1976, p. 306; Herman 2006, p. 185
Modest Bill	132	Back in the summer of '69	A Rhyme of Salem Town and Other Poems	2002			An early work^{C} (Lord 1976, p. 306)	Lord 1976, p. 306; Herman 2006, p. 185
Moment, A	16	Let me forget all men a space	The Howard Collector #13	Autumn 1970				Lord 1976, p. 180; Herman 2006, p. 185
Monarchs	4	These be kings of men	The Cross Plainsman	Aug 2004		Wikisource	Letter:^{K} Tevis Clyde Smith, June 23, 1926 (Herman 2006, p. 185); PD^{L}	Herman 2006, p. 185
The Moon			n/a	n/a			Lost^{U}	Thom, Herman & Woods, § C
"The moon above the Kerry hills ..."	22	The moon above the Kerry hills	Always Comes Evening	1957	Retribution; Black Michael's Story; The Song of Murtagh O'Brien; Untitled ("The moon above the Kerry hills ...")	"Retribution"	Titled Retribution from an untitled draft, Howard's original title The Song of Murtagh O'Brien was found on a later copy (Herman 2006, p. 196)	Lord 1976, p. 183; Herman 2006, p. 196
Moon Mockery	14	I walked in Tara's Wood one summer night	Weird Tales	Apr 1929		Wikisource	PD^{L}	Lord 1976, p. 180; Herman 2006, p. 185; Howard 2008, p. x
Moon Shame	34	The great black tower rose to split the stars	Always Comes Evening	1957	The Moon Woman; Voices of the Night	"Moon Shame"	Verse 4 of Voices of the Night (Herman 2006, p. 185); Two drafts exist (Herman 2006, p. 185); Letter:^{K} Tevis Clyde Smith, undated (Herman 2006, p. 185)	Lord 1976, p. 180; Herman 2006, p. 185
Moon Woman, The					Moon Shame			Lord 1976, p. 180; Herman 2006, p. 186
Moonlight and shadows barred the land	8	Moonlight and shadows barred the land	The Last of the Trunk Och Brev I Urval	Mar 2007	Untitled: Moonlight and shadows barred the land	Wikisource	Letter:^{K} Tevis Clyde Smith, c. late 1928 (Herman 2006, p. 227); PD^{L}	Herman 2006, p. 227
"The moonlight glimmered white ..."	91	The moonlight glimmered white across the sands	A Rhyme of Salem Town and Other Poems	2002	Mine But to Serve; Untitled ("The moonlight glimmered white ...")		Tentative title^{B} (Lord 1976, p. 306)	Lord 1976, p. 306; Herman 2006, p. 185
Moonlight on a Skull	16	Golden goats on a hillside black	Weird Tales	May 1933	Futility	"Moonlight on a Skull"	Letter:^{K} Tevis Clyde Smith, c. November 1931 (Herman 2006, p. 186); Similar to Futility (Lord 1976, p. 181)	Lord 1976, p. 181; Herman 2006, p. 186
Moor Ghost, The	16	They haled him to the crossroads	Weird Tales	Sep 1929		Wikisource	PD^{L}	Lord 1976, p. 181; Herman 2006, p. 186; Howard 2008, p. x
"Moses was our leader ..."	64 + a 12-line revision	Moses was our leader	Shadows of Dreams	1989	Odyssey of Israel, The; Untitled ("Moses was our leader ...")		Letter:^{K} Tevis Clyde Smith, c. March 1926 (Herman 2006, p. 189); In multiple parts, part of a projected longer work (Herman 2006, p. 189)	Herman 2006, p. 189
Mother Eve, Mother Eve, I name you a fool	4	Mother Eve, Mother Eve, I name you a fool	The Collected Letters of Robert E. Howard, Volume 1: 1923-1929	Jun 2007	Untitled: Mother Eve, Mother Eve, I name you a fool	Wikisource	Letter:^{K} Tevis Clyde Smith, c. January 1928 (Herman 2006, p. 227); PD^{L}	Herman 2006, p. 227
Mottoes of the Boy Scouts, The	16	If you lie not on the grass	The Last of the Trunk Och Brev I Urval	Mar 2007		Wikisource	Letter:^{K} Tevis Clyde Smith, c. Aug/Sep 1927 (Herman 2006, p. 186); PD^{L}	Herman 2006, p. 186
Mountains of California, The	12	Grass and the rains and snow	The Last of the Trunk Och Brev I Urval	Mar 2007		Wikisource	Letter:^{K} Tevis Clyde Smith, June 23, 1926 (Herman 2006, p. 186); PD^{L}	Herman 2006, p. 186
Murky the night	7	Murky the night	A Rhyme of Salem Town and Other Poems	2002	Untitled: Murky the night		Unfinished (Lord 1976, p. 312)	Lord 1976, p. 312; Herman 2006, p. 227
Musings (1)^{N}	10	The little poets sing of little things	Witchcraft & Sorcery #5	Jan-February 1971				Lord 1976, p. 181; Herman 2006, p. 186; Howard 2008, p. x
Musings (2)^{N}	12	To every man his trade	Shadows of Dreams	1989			Letter:^{K} Tevis Clyde Smith, c. November 1932 (Herman 2006, p. 186)	Herman 2006, p. 186
My brother he was an auctioneer	56	My brother he was an auctioneer	The Last of the Trunk Och Brev I Urval	Mar 2007	Untitled: My brother he was an auctioneer	Wikisource	Letter:^{K} Tevis Clyde Smith, c. November–December 1928 (Herman 2006, p. 227); PD^{L}	Herman 2006, p. 227
"My brothers are blond and calm of speech"	16	My brothers are blond and calm of speech	Verses in Ebony	1975	Alien; Untitled ("My brothers are blond and calm of speech")		Tentative title^{B}	Lord 1976, p. 300; Herman 2006, pp. 148–149; Thom, Herman & Woods, § A
My Children	18	Now God be thanked that gave me flesh and thew	The Last of the Trunk Och Brev I Urval	Mar 2007		Wikisource	Letter:^{K} Tevis Clyde Smith, c. December 1928 (Herman 2006, p. 187); PD^{L}	Herman 2006, p. 187
My empty skull is full of dust	56	My empty skull is full of dust	Shadows of Dreams	1989	A Poet's Skull		Letter:^{K} Tevis Clyde Smith, undated (Herman 2006, p. 193)	Herman 2006, p. 193
"My heart is a silver drum tonight"	14	My heart is a silver drum tonight	Shadows of Dreams	1989	Call of Pan, The; Untitled ("My heart is a silver drum tonight")		Letter:^{K} Tevis Clyde Smith, c. November 1928 (Herman 2006, p. 156)	Herman 2006, p. 156; Thom, Herman & Woods, § C
"My name is Baal ..."	57	My name is Baal; I walked the earth of yore	A Rhyme of Salem Town and Other Poems	2002	Baal; Untitled ("My name is Baal ...")		Tentative title^{B} (Lord 1976, p. 301)	Lord 1976, p. 301; Herman 2006, p. 151; Thom, Herman & Woods, § B
My Old Beaver Cap	48 lines, with a 2-line refrain repeated twelve times	I'll sing you a song as I go long	The Collected Letters of Robert E. Howard, Volume 1: 1923-1929	Jun 2007		https://www.loc.gov/collections/todd-and-sonkin-migrant-workers-from-1940-to-1941/?q=beaver+cap	Mnemonic reconstruction^{V} of a folk song; Letter:^{K} Robert W. Gordon, February 15, 1926; NOT INCLUDED IN COLLECTED POETRY	
My Sentiments Set to Jazz		Tum, tum, slam the drum!	The Right Hook, vol. 1, #3^{I}	1925				Herman 2006, p. 187
Mysteries, The	14		Yesteryear #4	Oct 1989			Letter:^{K} Tevis Clyde Smith, c. February 1929 (Herman 2006, p. 187); Cycle of three poems: "The Invocation" (4 lines), "The Chorus of the Chant" (2 lines), and "The Sacrifice" (8 lines)	Herman 2006, p. 187
Mystic	7	There is a strange and mystic land	The Last of the Trunk Och Brev I Urval	Mar 2007		Wikisource	Letter:^{K} Tevis Clyde Smith, June 23, 1926 (Herman 2006, p. 187); PD^{L}	Herman 2006, p. 187
Mystic Lore	4	A wizard who dwelt by Drumnakill	A Rhyme of Salem Town and Other Poems	2002	Untitled ("A wizard who dwelt in Drumnakill")		Tentative title^{B} (Lord 1976, p. 306)	Lord 1976, p. 306; Herman 2006, p. 187
Myth, The	24	Sages have said we leave our sex on earth	Desire and Other Erotic Poems	1989				Lord 1976, p. 306; Herman 2006, p. 187
Nancy Hawk - A Legend of Virginity	148	Nancy Hawk spread wide her knees	The Last of the Trunk Och Brev I Urval	Mar 2007		Wikisource	Letter:^{K} Tevis Clyde Smith, c. November 1928 (Herman 2006, p. 187); PD^{L}	Herman 2006, p. 187
Native Hell	20	As I was born in the slaughter yards	A Rhyme of Salem Town and Other Poems	2002				Lord 1976, p. 306; Herman 2006, p. 187
Nectar	24	Where I stand at the gates of Paradise	The Junto^{H}	Sep 1929				Lord 1976, p. 306; Herman 2006, p. 187
Negro Girl, A (Lord 1976, p. 306)	8	Favored child of a lucky star, born in a tolerant land	Desire and Other Erotic Poems	1989				Lord 1976, p. 306; Herman 2006, p. 187
Nelly Till (?)	24	Down by the cane brake ...	The Collected Letters of Robert E. Howard, Volume 1: 1923-1929	Jun 2007		http://pancocojams.blogspot.com/2013/09/down-in-canebrake-lyrics-sound-file.html	Mnemonic reconstruction^{V} of "Down by the Canebrake" (aka "Nancy Gill," "Come, Love, Come"); Letter:^{K} Robert W. Gordon, April 9, 1926; NOT INCLUDED IN COLLECTED POETRY	
Neolithic Love Song	8	Fast fall the years as / Leaves of the autumn time	Neolithic Love Song	1987			Letter:^{K} Tevis Clyde Smith, June 8, 1923 (Herman 2006, p. 187)	Herman 2006, p. 187
Never Beyond the Beast	16	Rise to the peak of the ladder	The Ghost Ocean and Other Poems of the Supernatural	1982	Untitled ("Rise to the peak of the ladder")		Tentative title^{B} (Lord 1976, p. 306)	Lord 1976, p. 306; Herman 2006, pp. 187–188
Niflheim	34	Grim land of death, what monstrous visions lurk	Always Comes Evening	1957				Lord 1976, p. 181; Herman 2006, p. 188
A Nigger Is Hanged			n/a	n/a			Lost^{U}	Thom, Herman & Woods, § C
Night			n/a	n/a			Lost^{U}; two different versions listed, one 24 lines, one 32 lines	Thom, Herman & Woods, § C
"Night falls"	18	Night falls	Weirdbook #11	1977	Nocturne; Untitled ("Night falls")		Tentative title^{B} (Lord 1976, p. 308)	Lord 1976, p. 308; Herman 2006, p. 188
"Night in the county of Donegal"	28	Night in the county of Donegal	A Rhyme of Salem Town and Other Poems	2002	Farewell, Proud Munster; Untitled ("Night in the county of Donegal")		Tentative title^{B} (Lord 1976, p. 304); An early work^{C} (Lord 1976, p. 304)	Lord 1976, p. 304; Herman 2006, p. 168
Night Mood	8	It is my mood to walk in silent streets	Singers in the Shadows	1970	Night-Mood			Lord 1976, p. 181; Herman 2006, p. 188
The Night the Nanette Sank			n/a	n/a			Lost^{U}	Thom, Herman & Woods, § C
Night Winds, The	32	The night winds whisper across the grass	Verses In Ebony	1975	Untitled ("The night winds whisper ...")		Tentative title^{B} (Lord 1976, p. 306)	Lord 1976, p. 306; Herman 2006, p. 188
"The night winds whisper ..."	32	The night winds whisper across the grass	Verses In Ebony	1975	Night Winds, The; Untitled ("The night winds whisper ...")		Tentative title^{B} (Lord 1976, p. 306)	Lord 1976, p. 306; Herman 2006, p. 188
Nights to Both of Us Known	28	The nights we walked among the stars	Shadows of Dreams	1989			Letter:^{K} Tevis Clyde Smith, c. June 1928 (Herman 2006, p. 188)	Herman 2006, p. 188
Nisapur	20	The day that towers, sapphire kissed	Always Comes Evening	1957	Untitled ("The day that towers ...")	"Nisapur"	Originally untitled (Lord 1976, p. 181)	Lord 1976, p. 181; Herman 2006, p. 188
No Man's Land	28	Across the wastes of No Man's Land, the grey-clad slayers came	A Rhyme of Salem Town and Other Poems	2002	Untitled ("Across the wastes of No Man's Land ...")		Tentative title^{B} (Lord 1976, p. 308)	Lord 1976, p. 308; Herman 2006, p. 188
No More the Serpent Prow	8	The House of Asgard passes with the night	The Howard Collector #14	Spring 1971	Untitled ("The House of Asgaard passes ...")		Originally untitled (Lord 1976, p. 181)	Lord 1976, p. 181; Herman 2006, p. 188
"'No more!' they swear ..."	10	"No more!" they swear; I laugh to hear them speak	The Howard Collector #18	Autumn 1973	Legacy of Tubal-Cain, The; Untitled ("'No more!' they swear ...")		Originally untitled (Lord 1976, p. 179)	Lord 1976, p. 179; Herman 2006, p. 180
Noah was my applesauce	24	Noah was my applesauce	The Collected Letters of Robert E. Howard, Volume 1: 1923-1929	Jun 2007	Untitled: Noah was my applesauce	Wikisource	Letter:^{K} Tevis Clyde Smith, c. November 1928 (Herman 2006, p. 227); PD^{L}	Herman 2006, p. 227
Nocturne	18	Night falls	Weirdbook #11	1977	Untitled ("Night falls")		Tentative title^{B} (Lord 1976, p. 308)	Lord 1976, p. 308; Herman 2006, p. 188
Not Only in Death They Die	20	The old man leaned on his rusty spade	Magazine of Horror #28	Jul 1969			PD^{L}	Lord 1976, p. 181; Herman 2006, p. 188
Now and Then	9	Twas twice a hundred centuries ago	A Rhyme of Salem Town and Other Poems	2002	Untitled ("'Twas twice a hundred centuries ago")		Tentative title^{B} (Lord 1976, p. 308); Unfinished (Lord 1976, p. 308)	Lord 1976, p. 308; Herman 2006, pp. 188–189
"Now anthropoid and leprous shadows lope"	18	Now anthropoid and leprous shadows lope	Amazing Stories	Mar 1986	All Hallows Eve; Untitled ("Now anthropoid and leprous shadows lope")		Tentative title^{B} (Lord 1976, p. 300)	Lord 1976, p. 300; Herman 2006, p. 149; Thom, Herman & Woods, § A
Now bright, now red, the sabers sped among the ...	8	Now bright, now red, the sabers sped among the	The Last of the Trunk Och Brev I Urval	Mar 2007	Untitled: Now bright, now red, the sabers sped	Wikisource	Letter:^{K} Tevis Clyde Smith, June 23, 1923 (Herman 2006, p. 228); PD^{L}	Herman 2006, p. 228
"Now come the days of high endeavor ..."	98	Now come the days of high endeavor and / The blare of brazen trumpets through the land.	Shadows of Dreams	1989	A Fable for Critics; Untitled ("Now come the days of high endeavor ...")		Letter:^{K} Tevis Clyde Smith, ca. November–December 1928	
"Now hark to this tale of long ago"	19	Now hark to this tale of long ago	A Rhyme of Salem Town and Other Poems	2002	When Men Were Bold; Untitled ("Now hark to this tale of long ago")		Tentative title^{B} (Lord 1976, p. 313); An early work^{C} (Lord 1976, p. 313); Unfinished (Lord 1976, p. 313)	Lord 1976, p. 313; Herman 2006, p. 238
"Now is a summer come out of the sea"	24	Now is a summer come out of the sea	Amra (vol. 2, no. 8)	Nov-December 1959	But the Hills Were Ancient Then; Untitled ("Now is a summer come out of the sea")	Wikisource	Originally untitled (Lord 1976, p. 171); Title created by George Scithers (Herman 2006, p. 156); PD^{L}	Lord 1976, p. 171; Herman 2006, p. 156; Thom, Herman & Woods, § B
"Now that the kings have fallen"	32	Now that the kings have fallen	The Howard Collector #11	Spring 1969	Where Are Your Knights, Donn Othna?; Untitled ("Now that the kings have fallen")		Originally untitled (Lord 1976, p. 191)	Lord 1976, p. 191; Herman 2006, p. 239
"Now the stars are all gleaming ..."	32	Now the stars are all gleaming	The Collected Letters of Robert E. Howard, Volume 1: 1923-1929	Jun 2007	Untitled: ("Now the stars are all gleaming ...")		Mnemonic reconstruction^{V} Letter:^{K} Robert W. Gordon, May 14, 1928; Howard's rendition of "a song I heard once some time ago and have heard only once," sung to him by a "wandering willy" to whom he'd given a lift; NOT INCLUDED IN COLLECTED POETRY	
Nun	4	I have anchored my ship to a quiet port	The Cross Plainsman	Aug 2006		Wikisource	Letter:^{K} Tevis Clyde Smith, June 23, 1926 (Herman 2006, p. 189); PD^{L}	Herman 2006, p. 189
O the Brave Sea-Rover	4	Oh, the rover hides in Aves when he runs	A Rhyme of Salem Town and Other Poems	2002		Untitled: O THE BRAVE SEA-ROVER	Tentative title^{B} (Lord 1976, p. 308); An early work^{C} (Lord 1976, p. 308)	Lord 1976, p. 308; Herman 2006, p. 189
Oaks, The	5	The great grey oaks by the banks of the river	A Rhyme of Salem Town and Other Poems	2002	Untitled ("The great gray oaks ...")		Tentative title^{B} (Lord 1976, p. 308)	Lord 1976, p. 308; Herman 2006, p. 189
An Oath			n/a	n/a			Lost^{U}	Thom, Herman & Woods, § C
Ocean-Thoughts	19	The strong winds whisper o'er the sea	The Cross Plainsman	Aug 2006		Wikisource	Letter:^{K} Tevis Clyde Smith, August 21, 1926 (Herman 2006, p. 189); PD^{L}	Herman 2006, p. 189
Odyssey of Israel, The	64 + a 12-line revision	Moses was our leader	Shadows of Dreams	1989	Untitled ("Moses was our leader ...")		Letter:^{K} Tevis Clyde Smith, c. March 1926 (Herman 2006, p. 189); In multiple parts, part of a projected longer work (Herman 2006, p. 189)	Herman 2006, p. 189
"O'er lakes agleam ..."	8	O'er lakes agleam the old gods dream	Always Comes Evening	1957	Chant of the White Beard; Untitled ("O'er lakes agleam ...")		From:^{T} Men of the Shadows (Lord 1976, p. 172); Originally untitled (Lord 1976, p. 172); From:^{T} Men of the Shadows (Herman 2006, p. 157)	Lord 1976, p. 172; Herman 2006, p. 157; Thom, Herman & Woods, § C
Oh, Babylon, Lost Babylon	23	Bab-ilu's women gazed upon our spears			Empire's Destiny—minus one line	Wikisource	"Empire's Destiny" is slightly different, one line longer; the appearance in NIGHT IMAGES is the first complete appearance; PD^{L}; Pen name: Patrick Howard^{O}	Lord 1976, p. 181; Herman 2006, p. 189
Oh, the road to glory lay	4	Oh, the road to glory lay	n/a	n/a	Untitled: Oh, the road to glory lay		From:^{T} The Pit of the Serpent (attributed to Mushy Hansen) (Herman 2006, p. 228); Never published separately (Herman 2006, p. 228)	Herman 2006, p. 228
Oh, The Stormy Winds	5 7-line verses and a 6-line chorus repeated after each one	The first came up / Was a little cabin boy	The Collected Letters of Robert E. Howard, Volume 1: 1923-1929	Jun 2007	The Mermaid; Untitled: ("The first came up / Was a little cabin boy ...")	https://www.youtube.com/watch?v=BcAPJ77WfCs	Mnemonic reconstruction^{V} of an old folk song Letter:^{K} Robert W. Gordon, February 4, 1925; NOT INCLUDED IN COLLECTED POETRY	
Oh, we are little children marching on to Hell!	2	Oh, we are little children marching on to Hell!			Untitled: Oh, we are little children marching on to Hell!		Letter:^{K} Tevis Clyde Smith, c. November 1928 (Herman 2006, p. 228); From:^{T} People of the Winged Skulls (Herman 2006, p. 228)	Herman 2006, p. 228
"Oh, ye who tread the narrow way"	4	Oh, ye who tread the narrow way	A Rhyme of Salem Town and Other Poems	2002	Exhortation' Untitled ("Oh, ye who tread the narrow way")		Tentative title^{B} (Lord 1976, p. 304); An early work^{C} (Lord 1976, p. 304)	Lord 1976, p. 304; Herman 2006, p. 167
Old Ballad	12	They trapped the Lion on Shamu's plain	Always Comes Evening^{A}	1957^{A}	One of 5 chapter headings for the CONAN tale "The Scarlet Citadel"		Epigraph:^{S} The Scarlet Citadelt (Lord 1976, p. 206)	Lord 1976, p. 206; Herman 2006, p. 189
An Old Border Ballad	5	Mike O'Mara rode up from Sonora	The Vultures^{A}	1973^{A}		Embedded in the story "Showdown at Hell's Canyon" (aka "The Judgment of the Desert"); possible mnemonic reconstruction, but as yet, no antecedent has been found		
Old Faro Bill was a man of might	20	Old Faro Bill was a man of might	The Collected Letters of Robert E. Howard, Volume 1: 1923-1929	Jun 2007	Untitled: Old Faro Bill was a man of might	Wikisource	Letter:^{K} Tevis Clyde Smith, c. November 1928 (Herman 2006, p. 228); PD^{L}	Herman 2006, p. 228
Old Gods Brood, The	44	The mallet clashes on the nail	Fantasy Book #21	September 1986	And Man Was Given the Earth to Rule; For Man Was Given the Earth to Rule		Listed as "And . . ." in Fantasy Book;"The Old Gods Brood" is from Glenn Lord's title to an untitled typescript.	Lord 1976, p. 308; Herman 2006, p. 169
Old Ones, The	8	They lumber through the night	Echoes From An Iron Harp^{A}	1972^{A}	The Thing on the Roof; Out of the Old Land		Justin Geoffrey^{R} (Herman 2006, pp. 213–214); This is the published title, The Old Ones was the draft title, from The Thing on the Roof(Herman 2006, p. 214)	Lord 1976, p. 206; Herman 2006, pp. 191, 213–214
Old Rime	3	One fled			Rogues in the House (verse heading)		This poem has only appeared with the story	
On the Beach			n/a	n/a			Lost^{U}	Thom, Herman & Woods, § C
On the Lakes of the Pontchartrain	16	I asked her if she'd marry me	The Collected Letters of Robert E. Howard, Volume 1: 1923-1929	Jun 2007		https://www.youtube.com/watch?v=Ad8RVexRUoQ	Mnemonic reconstruction^{V} of an old folk song; Letter:^{K} Robert W. Gordon, February 15, 1926; NOT INCLUDED IN COLLECTED POETRY	
On the Lakes of the Pontchartrain	12	'Twas on one bright March morning	A Means to Freedom: The Letters of H. P. Lovecraft and Robert E. Howard Volume 2: 1930–1932	2011		https://www.youtube.com/watch?v=Ad8RVexRUoQ	Mnemonic reconstruction^{V} of an old folk song; Letter:^{K} H. P. Lovecraft, ca. October 1932; NOT INCLUDED IN COLLECTED POETRY	
On With the Play	14	Up with the curtain, lo, the stage is set	The Howard Collector #17	Autumn 1972	Untitled ("Up with the curtain, lo, ...")		Originally untitled (Lord 1976, p. 182)	Lord 1976, p. 182; Herman 2006, p. 190
One Black Stain, The	45	They carried him out on the barren sand where the rebel captains died	The Howard Collector #2	Spring 1962		Wikisource	A Solomon Kane poem; PD^{L}	Lord 1976, p. 182; Herman 2006, p. 190
One Blood Strain	22	Now autumn comes and summer goes	The Collected Letters of Robert E. Howard, Volume 2: 1930-1932	Oct 2007		Wikisource	Letter:^{K} Tevis Clyde Smith, c. September 1932 (Herman 2006, p. 190) PD^{L}	Herman 2006, p. 190
"One slept beneath the branches dim"	44	One slept beneath the branches dim	Red Shadows	1968	Return of Sir Richard Grenville, The; Untitled ("One slept beneath the branches dim")		Originally untitled (Lord 1976, p. 183); A Solomon Kane poem	Lord 1976, p. 183; Herman 2006, p. 196
One Who Comes at Eventide	16	I think when I am old a furtive shape	Modern American Poetry	1933		Wikisource	PD^{L}	Lord 1976, p. 182; Herman 2006, p. 190; Howard 2008, p. x
Only a Shadow on the Grass	4	The tribes of men rise up and pass	Weirdbook #13	1978	Untitled ("The tribes of men rise up and pass")		Tentative title^{B} (Lord 1976, p. 308)	Lord 1976, p. 308; Herman 2006, p. 190
Open Window, An	4	Beyond the Veil what gulfs of Time and Space?	Weird Tales	Sep 1932		"An Open Window"	From:^{T} The House in the Oaks (Lord 1976, p. 182); Justin Geoffrey^{R} (Lord 1976, p. 182)	Lord 1976, p. 182; Herman 2006, p. 191; Howard 2008, p. x
Open Window, The	20	I remember my sister Eve	A Rhyme of Salem Town and Other Poems	2002			Pen name: Patrick Howard^{O} (Lord 1976, p. 299)	Lord 1976, p. 299; Herman 2006, p. 191
Opium Dream, An	100	God is God and Mahommed his prophet	Altars and Jesters; Opium Dream, A	1974	Altars and Jesters			Lord 1976, p. 300; Herman 2006, p. 149; Thom, Herman & Woods, § AHerman 2006, p. 191
Orientia	14	Castinet, castanet! / When the floating sun has set	The Last of the Trunk Och Brev I Urval	Mar 2007		Wikisource	Letter:^{K} Tevis Clyde Smith, June 23, 1926 (Herman 2006, p. 191); PD^{L}	Herman 2006, p. 191
Out in front of Goldstein's	8, plus seven additional 2-line choruses—22 lines total	Out in front of Goldstein's	The Last of the Trunk Och Brev I Urval	Mar 2007	Untitled: Out in front of Goldstein's	Wikisource	Letter:^{K} Tevis Clyde Smith, c. December 1928 (Herman 2006, p. 228); In addition to the opening 8-line song parody of "East Side, West Side (The Sidewalks of New York)," there are also seven two-line choruses scattered throughout the letter; PD^{L}	Herman 2006, p. 228
Out of Asia the tribesmen came	4	Out of Asia the tribesmen came	The Cross Plainsman	Aug 2004	Untitled: Out of Asia the tribesmen came	Wikisource	Letter:^{K} Tevis Clyde Smith, July 30, 1923 (Herman 2006, p. 229); PD^{L};	Herman 2006, p. 228
Out of the Deep	24	The blind black shadows reach inhuman arms	The Fantasy Fan	Sep 1934	A Drum Begins to Throb; Voices Waken Memory, The	Wikisource	PD^{L}; Part 1 of the Voices of the Night cycle	Lord 1976, p. 190; Herman 2006, p. 237
Out of the Old Land	8	They lumber through the night	Echoes From An Iron Harp^{A}	1972^{A}	The Thing on the Roof; The Old Ones		Justin Geoffrey^{R} (Herman 2006, pp. 213–214); This is the published title, The Old Ones was the draft title, from The Thing on the Roof(Herman 2006, p. 214)	Lord 1976, p. 206; Herman 2006, pp. 191, 213–214
"Out of the Texas desert ..."	31	Out of the Texas desert, over the Rio Grande	A Rhyme of Salem Town and Other Poems	2002	Bandit, The; Untitled ("Out of the Texas desert ...")		Tentative title^{B} (Lord 1976, p. 301); An early work^{C} (Lord 1976, p. 301)	Lord 1976, p. 301; Herman 2006, p. 153; Thom, Herman & Woods, § B
The Outbound Trail			n/a	n/a			Lost^{U}	Thom, Herman & Woods, § C
Outcast, The	12	Forth from the purple and feats of the palace	The Grim Land and Others	1976	Untitled ("Forth from the purple ...")		Tentative title^{B} (Lord 1976, p. 308)	Lord 1976, p. 308; Herman 2006, p. 191
Outgoing of Sigurd the Jerusalem-Farer, The	23	The fires roared in the skalli-hall	Verses in Ebony	1975				Lord 1976, p. 308; Herman 2006, p. 191
Outworn Story, An	21	There come long days when the soul turns sick	Fantasy Tales	Summer 1987	Untitled ("There come long days ...")		Tentative title^{B} (Lord 1976, p. 308); British^{P} (Herman 2006, p. 184)	Lord 1976, p. 308; Herman 2006, p. 191
"Over the hills the winds ..." ^{N}	14	Over the hills the winds of the seas	A Rhyme of Salem Town and Other Poems	2002	Winds of the Sea, The (1); Untitled ("Over the hills the winds ...")		Tentative title^{B} (Lord 1976, p. 314)	Lord 1976, p. 314; Herman 2006, p. 240
"Over the hills the winds ..." ^{N}	16	Over the hills the winds of the seas	The Last of the Trunk Och Brev I Urval	Mar 2007	Winds of the Sea, The (2); Untitled ("Over the hills the winds ...")			Herman 2006, p. 240
Over the Old Rio Grandey	12	Over the old Rio Grandey	A Rhyme of Salem Town and Other Poems	2002	Untitled ("Over the old Rio Grandey")		Tentative title^{B} (Lord 1976, p. 308); An early work^{C} (Lord 1976, p. 308)	Lord 1976, p. 308; Herman 2006, p. 192
"Over the place the lights go out"	47	Over the place the lights go out	Robert E. Howard's Fight Magazine #4	Oct 1996	In the Ring; Untitled ("Over the place the lights go out")		Tentative title^{B} (Lord 1976, p. 307)	Lord 1976, p. 307; Herman 2006, p. 175

== Notes ==
Further explanations

- ^A These publications/dates indicate where and when these headings were first published independently of the works to which they were originally attached. (Lord 1976, p. 106)
- ^B These tentative titles were used by Glenn Lord as a means to identify the poems where no original title was available. (Lord 1976, pp. 106–107)
- ^C An early work is defined as one believed to have been written before 1924. (Lord 1976, p. 107)

Notes on publications

- ^D The Tattler was the newspaper of Brownwood High School. (Lord 1976, p. 107)
- ^E The Cross Plains Review is the weekly newspaper for Cross Plains, Texas. (Lord 1976, p. 107)
- ^F The Yellow Jacket is the newspaper of Howard Payne College. (Lord 1976, p. 107)
- ^G The Daniel Baker Collegian was the newspaper of Daniel baker College of Brownwood; the college has since merged with Howard Payne College. (Lord 1976, p. 107)
- ^H The Junto was a literary travelogue circulated from member to member on a mailing list from 1928 to 1930. (Lord 1976, p. 341)
- ^I The Golden Caliph (1922 or 1923, one issue) and The Right Hook (1925, three issues) were amateur magazines created by Robert E. Howard and Tevis Clyde Smith as teenagers. (Herman 2006, pp. 407 & 427)
- ^J The Progress was published by Cross Plains High School.

Notes on short hand

- ^K All or part of these poems are from or were included in a letter from Robert E. Howard to some recipient (the date is either the explicit date on the letter, an approximate dating of the letter where possible or else simply marked undated). e.g. "Letter: Tevis Clyde Smith, June 23, 1926" indicates that the poem is from a letter to Tevis Clyde Smith dated June 23, 1926.
- ^L These poems are in the public domain in the United States and any country where the Rule of the Shorter Term applies. (Herman 2007, Poems)
- ^M With these poems, two or more sources give different publications and dates of the first appearance. e.g. "Conflict: Lord (1976, p. 186), The Howard Collector, 1962/Herman (2006, p. 204), The Junto, 1929" indicates that Lord (1976, p. 186) states first publication as The Howard Collector (published in 1962), while Herman (2006, p. 204) states first publication as The Junto (published in 1929). Always listed with the earliest date first.
- ^N Howard sometimes used the same title more than once, or the same title has been attached to untitled works by others. In these cases the poems have been numbered to distinguish them. e.g. "(2)" following the title indicates that this the second poem with the same name.
- ^O These poems were published under a pen name. e.g. "Pen name: Patrick Howard" indicated that the poem was published under the pen name Patrick Howard.
- ^P These poems were first published in a non-American publication. e.g. "French" indicates that it was first published in a French book or magazine.
- ^R These poems are attributed to "Justin Geoffrey," a fictional poet Howard created for his fiction.
- ^S These poems were originally used as epigraphs, heading chapter and whole stories, in works of prose fiction. This list shows where they were printed separately from the prose. e.g. "Epigraph: The Phoenix on the Sword" indicates that the poem was used as an opening in the short story The Phoenix on the Sword.
- ^T These poems were part of a different work, usually prose fiction, but were not used to open the work or head chapters. This list shows where they were printed separately from the main work, if at all. e.g. "From: Men of the Shadows" indicates that this poem was originally included in, or part of, the short storyMen of the Shadows.
- ^U Poems with these titles are on record but no known copy exists today.

== See also ==
- List of works by Robert E. Howard
