= Action Stories =

American pulp fiction magazine

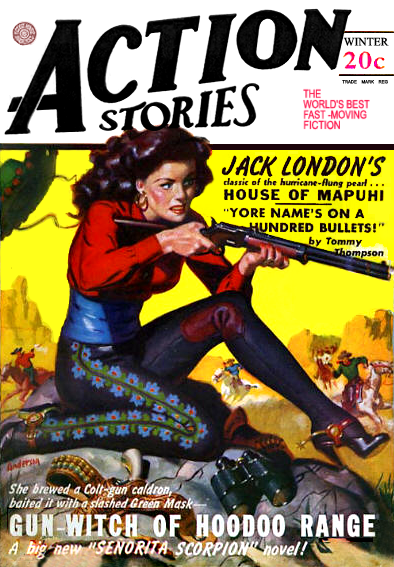
- Editor: Unknown pre-October 1935 J. F. Byrne (October 1935-June 1936); Malcolm Reiss (August 1936-Spring 1949) Unknown post-spring 1949
- Categories: Pulp magazine
- Frequency: Monthly (September 1921–December 1932) Irregular (November 1933–March 1934); Bi-monthly (June 1934–June 1936); Monthly (August 1936–January 1937); Bi-monthly (February 1937–April 1943) Quarterly (Summer 1943-Fall 1950)
- First issue: September 1921
- Final issue: Fall 1950
- Company: Fiction House
- Country: USA

Action Stories was a multi-genre pulp magazine published between September 1921 and Fall 1950, with a brief hiatus at the end of 1932.

As an adventure pulp, Action Stories focused on real-world adventure stories. At first the magazine published mainly westerns, but it branched out into sports fiction, war stories and adventures in exotic countries by 1937.

Writers whose work appeared in Action Stories included Robert E. Howard, Walt Coburn, Morgan Robertson (a number of his stories were posthumously published here), Horace McCoy, Theodore Roscoe, Greye La Spina, Anthony M. Rud, Thomas Thursday and Les Savage, Jr. Action Stories occasionally reprinted fiction by writers such as Jack London and Edgar Wallace. The magazine also carried a Dashiell Hammett story ("Laughing Masks", November 1923) printed under Hammett's "Peter Collinson" pseudonym.

Action Stories had covers illustrated by Norman Saunders, George Gross and Allen Anderson.
