= Marchers of Valhalla =

- Cover of the first edition
- Author: Robert E. Howard
- Illustrator: Robert Bruce Acheson
- Cover artist: Robert Bruce Acheson
- Language: English
- Genre: Fantasy novelettes
- Publisher: Donald M. Grant, Publisher, Inc.
- Publication date: 1972
- Publication place: United States
- Media type: Print (hardback)
- Pages: 121 pp
- OCLC: 585031

Marchers of Valhalla is a collection of two Fantasy novelettes by Robert E. Howard. It was first published in 1972 by Donald M. Grant, Publisher, Inc. in an edition of 1,654 copies. Grant published another collection of this title in 1977 OCLC 3178161. This 1977 edition added one story and included dust-jacket and illustrations by Marcus Boas.

== Contents ==
=== 1972 book ===
- Introduction
- "Marchers of Valhalla"
- "The Thunder–Rider"

=== 1977 book ===
- "Marchers of Valhalla"
- "The Grey God Passes"
- "The Thunder–Rider"
