= Post Oaks & Sand Roughs =

Book by Robert E. Howard

- Cover of the first edition
- Author: Robert E. Howard
- Cover artist: Phil Hale
- Language: English
- Genre: Adventure novel
- Publisher: Donald M. Grant, Publisher, Inc.
- Publication date: 1990
- Publication place: United States
- Media type: Print (Hardback)
- Pages: 176 pp
- ISBN: 0-937986-93-3
- OCLC: 22144521

Post Oaks & Sand Roughs is a semi-autobiographical adventure novel by Robert E. Howard. It was first published in 1989 in France by NéO (Nouvelles Editions Oswald) under the title of "Le Rebelle", since 1990 by Donald M. Grant, Publisher, Inc. in an edition of 850 copies. The book contains an introduction and appendix by Glenn Lord where Lord identifies the real people who appear as thinly disguised characters in the novel.
