= The Road of Azrael =

1979 collection of short stories by Robert E. Howard

- Cover of the first edition
- Author: Robert E. Howard
- Illustrator: Roy G. Krenkel
- Cover artist: Roy G. Krenkel
- Language: English
- Genre: Historical short stories
- Publisher: Donald M. Grant, Publisher, Inc.
- Publication date: 1979
- Publication place: United States
- Media type: Print (hardback)
- Pages: 230
- OCLC: 5297679

The Road of Azrael is a collection of historical short stories by American writer Robert E. Howard. It was first published in 1979 by Donald M. Grant, Publisher, Inc. in an edition of 2,150 copies, of which, 300 were boxed and signed by the artist.

== Contents ==
- "Hawks over Egypt"
- "The Track of Bohemond"
- "Gates of Empire"
- "The Road of Azrael"
- "The Way of the Swords" (originally named "The Road of the Eagles" by Howard)

== Sources ==
- Chalker, Jack L.; Mark Owings (1998). The Science-Fantasy Publishers: A Bibliographic History, 1923-1998. Westminster, MD and Baltimore: Mirage Press, Ltd. p. 325.
- Clute, John; John Grant (1997). The Encyclopedia of Fantasy. New York: St. Martin's Press. p. 483. ISBN 0-88184-708-9.
