= Fight Stories =

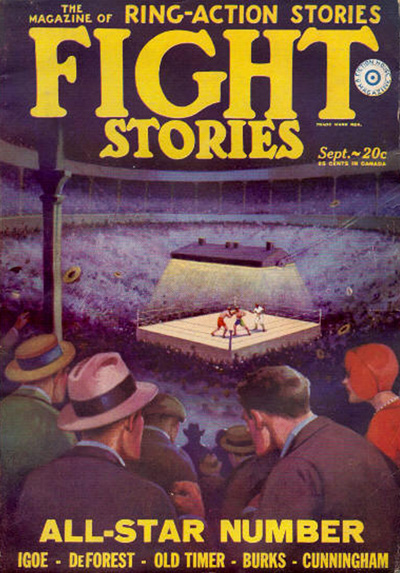
- Cover of Fight Stories Volume 2, #4 (Sept. 1929)
- Editor: William H. Kofoed (1928-1932); Jack O'Sullivan (1936-1952)
- Categories: Pulp magazine
- Frequency: Monthly (1928-1932); Quarterly (1936-1952)
- First issue: May 1928
- Final issue Number: Spring 1952; 106
- Company: Fiction House
- Country: USA
- Language: English

Fight Stories was a pulp magazine devoted to stories of boxing. Published by Fiction House, it ran 47 issues cover-dated June 1928 to May 1932, followed by a four-year hiatus. It then ran an additional 59 issues, dated Spring 1936 - Spring 1952. It is best remembered for publishing a large number of stories by Robert E. Howard. The magazine also published fiction by Arthur J. Burks.
