= Kirby O'Donnell =

- First appearance: Swords of Shahrazar
- Last appearance: The Curse of the Crimson God
- Created by: Robert E. Howard

Kirby O'Donnell is a fictional character created by Robert E. Howard. He is an American treasure hunter in early-twentieth century Afghanistan disguised as a Kurdish merchant, "Ali el Ghazi". Howard only wrote three stories about O'Donnell, one of which was not published within his lifetime.

O'Donnell has, like many Howard characters, the stereotypical "Black Irish" combination of black hair and blue eyes. He has a lithe but powerful physique, relying more on agility and wits than strength. Kirby O'Donnell is similar to another of Howard's characters, El Borak, in many ways. However, O'Donnell seeks hidden treasures in all of his stories while El Borak is more concerned with his own form of justice and stability in Afghanistan. O'Donnell carries a set of distinctive weapons, a scimitar with a bronze hawk-head on the pommel and a "kindhjal" [sic].

== Stories ==
Howard wrote three complete Kirby O'Donnell stories. Two were published in his life, by different publishers.

=== Swords of Shahrazar ===
This story was first published in the pulp magazine Top-Notch in October 1934. Later reprints have used the title The Treasure of Shaibar Khan. It was received by Howard's agent, Otis Adelbert Kline on 12 January 1934. It was returned to Howard for rewrites on 21 February and 30 April before publication in October. Howard earned $124.90 for the publication of this story.

This is a sequel to The Treasures of Tartary, despite being published before that story, and it is again set partly in the forbidden city of Shahrazar.

=== The Treasure of Tartary ===
This story was first published in the pulp magazine Thrilling Adventures in January 1935. It was originally titled Gold From Tartary.

It was received by Howard's agent on 15 November 1933 and Howard earned $42.50 for its publication.

O'Donnell searches the forbidden city of Shahrazar, ruled by the Uzbek Shaibar Khan, for the lost treasure of Khuwarezm (which, legend states, was hidden to protect it from Genghis Khan).

=== The Curse of the Crimson God ===
The third O'Donnell story, originally titled The Trail of the Bloodstained God, was not published within Howard's lifetime. The writer L. Sprague de Camp found it amongst Howard's papers and edited it into the Conan story The Blood-Stained God, which was first published in Tales of Conan in 1955. The O'Donnell version of the story first saw print much later in the paperback Swords of Shahrazar in 1976.

The story was returned by Thrilling Adventures on 8 October 1935. Howard sent a rewritten version to Kline on 31 January 1936. Kline sent this to several pulp magazines but all returned it – Dime Adventure (sent 4 February 1936, returned 2 March), Short Stories (3 March, returned 18 March), Adventure (19 March, returned 8 April) and Argosy (9 April, returned 22 April).

In this story, O'Donnell is in pursuit of thieves who have stolen from him a treasure map that points the way to the precious idol called The Bloodstained God.
