= Lord of the Dead =

1981 collection of short stories by Robert E. Howard

- Cover of the first edition
- Author: Robert E. Howard
- Illustrator: G. Duncan Eagleson
- Cover artist: G. Duncan Eagleson
- Language: English
- Genre: Crime short stories
- Publisher: Donald M. Grant, Publisher, Inc.
- Publication date: 1981
- Publication place: United States
- Media type: Print (hardback)
- Pages: 187 pp
- ISBN: 0-937986-35-6
- OCLC: 8357599
- Dewey Decimal: 813/.52 19
- LC Class: PS3515.O842 L6 1981

Lord of the Dead is a collection of crime short stories by Robert E. Howard. It was first published in 1981 by Donald M. Grant, Publisher, Inc. in an edition of 1,250 copies. The stories are pastiches of Sax Rohmer.

== Contents ==
- "Introduction—From Limehouse to River Street", by Robert E. Briney
- "The Lord of the Dead"
- "Names in the Black Book"
- "The Mystery of Tannernoe Lodge", with Fred Blosser
