= Thrilling Mystery =

American magazine

Thrilling Mystery was an American pulp magazine published from 1935 to 1944. New York publisher Standard Magazines had a stable of magazines with the "Thrilling" prefix, including Thrilling Detective, Thrilling Love, and Thrilling Adventures, but in 1935, Popular Publications, a rival publisher, launched a weird menace pulp titled Thrilling Mysteries. Standard Magazines sued over the use of the word "Thrilling", and Popular conceded, settling out of court. Thrilling Mysteries was cancelled after a single issue, and in October 1935 Standard began Thrilling Mystery. Like Thrilling Mysteries this was a terror pulp, but it contained less sex and violence than most of the genre, and as a result, in the opinion of science fiction historian Mike Ashley, "the stories had greater originality, although they are not necessarily of better quality". Ashley singles out Carl Jacobi's "Satan's Kite", about a family cursed because of a theft from a temple in Borneo, as worthy of mention. There were two detective stories by Robert E. Howard, the creator of Conan. Other contributors included Fritz Leiber, Fredric Brown, Seabury Quinn, Robert Bloch, and Henry Kuttner. There was little science fiction in the magazine, but some fantasy: pulp historian Robert K. Jones cites Arthur J. Burks "Devils in the Dust" as "one of the most effective" stories, with "a mood as bleak as an arctic blizzard", and Ashley agrees, calling it "particularly powerful".

In 1945 the title changed to Thrilling Mystery Novel Magazine, and it became Detective Mystery Novel Magazine in 1947, and 2 Detective Mystery Novels Magazine in 1949, finally ceasing publication in 1951.

== Bibliographic details ==
Thrilling Mystery was published by Standard Magazines, and produced a total of 88 issues under four different titles between October 1935 and Winter 1951. It was pulp format for all issues, with between 96 and 146 pages. It began at 10 cents, changing to 15 cents with the Winter 1945 issue when the title changed to Thrilling Mystery Novel Magazine; the title changed again to Detective Mystery Novel Magazine with the Summer 1947 issue, and the price increased to 20 cents in Spring 1948 and again to 25 cents in Fall 1949. The following issue the title became 2 Detective Mystery Novels Magazine. There were three numbers to a volume, with some irregularities: there was no issue 7/1, and no volume 13.

== Sources ==
- Jones, Robert Kenneth (1983). "Thrilling Mystery". In Cook, Michael L. (ed.). Mystery, Detective, and Espionage Magazines. Westport, Connecticut: Greenwood Press. pp. 573–575. ISBN 0-313-23310-1.
- Ashley, Mike (1985). "Thrilling Mystery". In Tymn, Marshall B.; Ashley, Mike (eds.). Science Fiction, Fantasy and Weird Fiction Magazines. Westport, Connecticut: Greenwood Press. pp. 666–667. ISBN 0-3132-1221-X.
