= Red Shadows (Howard book) =

- Cover of the first edition
- Author: Robert E. Howard
- Illustrator: Jeff Jones
- Cover artist: Jeff Jones
- Language: English
- Series: Solomon Kane
- Genre: Fantasy
- Publisher: Donald M. Grant, Publisher, Inc.
- Publication date: 1968
- Publication place: United States
- Media type: Print (hardback)
- Pages: 381
- OCLC: 2273652

Red Shadows is a collection of Fantasy short stories and poems by American writer Robert E. Howard. It was first published in 1968 by Donald M. Grant, Publisher, Inc. in an edition of 896 copies. The stories and poems feature Howard's character, Solomon Kane. Many of the stories first appeared in the magazine Weird Tales.

== Contents ==
- "Skulls in the Stars"
- "The Right Hand of Doom"
- "Red Shadows"
- "Rattle of Bones"
- "The Castle of the Devil"
- "The Moon of Skulls"
- "The One Black Stain"
- "Blades of the Brotherhood"
- "The Hills of the Dead"
- "Hawk of Basti"
- "The Return of Sir Richard Grenville"
- "Wings in the Night"
- "The Footfalls Within"
- "The Children of Asshur"
- "Solomon Kane’s Homecoming"

== Sources ==
- Chalker, Jack L.; Mark Owings (1998). The Science-Fantasy Publishers: A Bibliographic History, 1923-1998. Westminster, MD and Baltimore: Mirage Press, Ltd. pp. 321, 325.
- Contento, William G. "Index to Science Fiction Anthologies and Collections". Archived from the original on January 23, 2009.
- Tuck, Donald H. (1974). The Encyclopedia of Science Fiction and Fantasy. Chicago: Advent. p. 221. ISBN 0-911682-20-1.
