= Lich =

Undead creature from fantasy literature

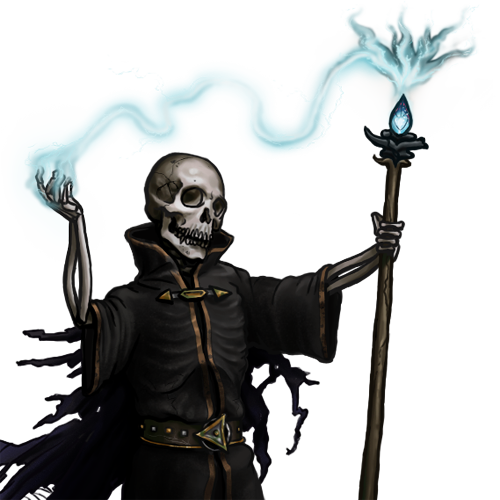
- A lich from the game The Battle for Wesnoth

Creature information
- Other name: Liche
- Grouping: Legendary creature
- Sub grouping: Undead
- Similar entities: Zombie, magician, revenant, skeleton

In fantasy fiction, a lich (/lɪtʃ/) is a type of undead creature with magical powers.

Various works of fantasy fiction, such as Clark Ashton Smith's "The Empire of the Necromancers" (1932), had used lich as a general term for any corpse, animate or inanimate, before the term's specific use in fantasy role-playing games. The more recent use of the term lich for a specific type of undead creature originates from the 1976 Dungeons & Dragons role-playing game booklet Greyhawk, written by Gary Gygax and Rob Kuntz.

Often such a creature is the result of a willful transformation, as a powerful wizard skilled in necromancy who seeks eternal life uses rare substances in a magical ritual to become undead. Unlike zombies, which are often depicted as mindless, liches are sapient revenants, retaining their previous intelligence and magical abilities. Liches are often depicted as holding power over lesser mindless undead soldiers and servants.

A lich's most commonly depicted distinguishing feature, compared to other undead in fantasy fiction, is the method by which it achieves immortality: liches surrender their souls to create "soul-artifacts" (often called a "soul gem" or "phylactery" in other fantasy works), which serve as the source of their magic and immortality. Many liches take precautions to hide and/or protect one or more of these soul-artifacts, which anchor parts of their souls to the material world. If a lich's corporeal body is destroyed, the portion of its soul that remained in the body does not pass on to the afterlife; rather, it persists in a non-corporeal form capable of being reconstituted or resurrected. However, if all of a lich's soul-artifacts are destroyed, its only remaining anchor to the material world becomes its corporeal body—meaning that its destruction would result in permanent death.

== Etymology ==
The word "lich" is derived from the Old English līċ, meaning "corpse". It is cognate with modern German Leiche, modern Danish lig, and modern Dutch lijk, all of which also mean "corpse".

== In literature ==
The literary lich developed from monsters found in earlier classic sword and sorcery fiction, which is filled with powerful sorcerers who use their magic to triumph over death. Many of Clark Ashton Smith's short stories feature powerful wizards whose magic enables them to return from the dead. Several stories by Robert E. Howard, such as the novella Skull-Face (1929) and the short story "Scarlet Tears", feature undying sorcerers who retain a semblance of life through mystical means, their bodies reduced to shriveled husks with which they manage to maintain inhuman mobility and active thought.

The term lich, used as an archaic word for corpse (or body), is commonly used in these stories. Ambrose Bierce's tale of possession "The Death of Halpin Frayser" features the word in its introduction, referring to a corpse. H. P. Lovecraft also used the word in "The Thing on the Doorstep" (published 1937) where the narrator refers to the corpse of his friend possessed by a sorcerer. Liches are sometimes depicted using a magical device called a phylactery to anchor their souls to the physical world so that if their body is destroyed they can rise again over and over, as long as the phylactery remains intact. Other imagery surrounding demiliches, in particular that of a jeweled skull, is drawn from the early Fritz Leiber story "Thieves' House".

Gary Gygax, one of the co-creators of Dungeons & Dragons, said that he based the description of a lich included in the game on the short story "The Sword of the Sorcerer" (1969) by Gardner Fox.

== In popular culture ==
=== In print ===
- Acererak is the final boss of the classic Dungeons and Dragons adventure module Tomb of Horrors; Acererak was also featured as the guardian of the Copper Key in the book Ready Player One by Ernest Cline.
- In the webcomic The Order of the Stick, the main villain Xykon is a lich.
- In the Harry Potter series, the main antagonist Voldemort commands armies of undead inferi and uses magical devices called horcruxes to store fragments of his soul in order to allow him to resurrect himself in the event that his body dies.

=== Film and television ===
- In the Adventure Time television series, the main antagonist is an evil, powerful undead being known simply as "The Lich". He describes himself as an ancient, cosmic being who is the manifestation of the inevitable death of all things.

=== Tabletop ===
- In the Dungeons & Dragons game, a lich is a spellcaster who seeks to defy death by magical means.
- Liches also appear in other fantasy settings that draw upon D&D for inspiration, such as:
  - 13th Age
  - Pathfinder Roleplaying Game
  - Warhammer Fantasy

=== Video games ===
- Liches are prominent in the Might and Magic series of video games, appearing primarily as enemies, but also as playable characters in several installments. They are equally prevalent in the spin-off series Heroes of Might and Magic, where they appear in most installments as recruitable creatures, but also as heroes. One of the most prolific liches in New World Computing's old continuity was Sandro, appearing in many titles and referenced in many more. The primary antagonist of Heroes of Might and Magic III: Restoration of Erathia is also a lich: the former king of Erathia raised by necromancers.
- The Baldur's Gate series of video games includes several liches, as powerful but optional boss fights.
- Warcraft III and World of Warcraft: Wrath of the Lich King features the continent of Northrend, the realm of the eponymous Lich King and his undead minions. Arthas Menethil, also known as the Lich King, one of the most prominent antagonists in Warcraft lore, appears as a raid boss in the Wrath of the Lich King expansion, as well as a playable character in the crossover video game Heroes of the Storm.
- In the Dota series of video games, Lich is one of the playable heroes.
- In League of Legends, the champion Karthus embraced the gift of death and became a lich.
- In the video game Enter the Gungeon, a lich is the final boss located in Bullet Hell.
- In Dragon Age: The Veilguard, companion Emmrich Volkarin can become a lich.
- In Deadlock, the hero Graves uses the severed hand of a lich as her in-game weapon. The lich hand also acts as her mentor in necromancy.

== See also ==
- Koschei
- Lyke-Wake Dirge
- Mumm-Ra
- Mummy (undead)
- Nazgûl
- Skeletor
- Thulsa Doom
- Voldemort
- Wight
- Wraith
