= Skull-Face and Others =

1946 collection of short stories by Robert E. Howard

- Dust-jacket illustration by Hannes Bok for Skull-Face and Others
- Author: Robert E. Howard
- Cover artist: Hannes Bok
- Language: English
- Genre: Fantasy, horror
- Publisher: Arkham House
- Publication date: 1946
- Publication place: United States
- Media type: Print (hardback)
- Pages: x, 475

Skull-Face and Others is a collection of fantasy and horror short stories by American writer Robert E. Howard. It was the author's third book and was published by Arkham House in 1946 in an edition of 3,004 copies.

Most of the stories had originally appeared in the magazine Weird Tales.

== Contents ==
Skull-Face and Others contains the following tales:

1. "Foreword" by August Derleth
2. "Which Shall Scarcely Be Understood"
3. "Robert Ervin Howard: A Memorium" by H. P. Lovecraft
4. "A Memory of R.E. Howard" by E. Hoffmann Price
5. "Wolfshead"
6. "The Black Stone"
7. "The Horror from the Mound"
8. "The Cairn on the Headland"
9. "Black Canaan"
10. "The Fire of Asshurbanipal"
11. "A Man-Eating Jeopard"
12. "Skull Face"
13. "The Hyborian Age"
14. "Worms of the Earth"
15. "The Valley of the Worm"
16. "Skulls in the Stars"
17. "Rattle of Bones"
18. "The Hills of the Dead"
19. "Wings in the Night"
20. "The Shadow Kingdom"
21. "The Mirrors of Tuzun Thune"
22. "Kings of the Night"
23. "The Phoenix on the Sword"
24. "The Scarlet Citadel"
25. "The Tower of the Elephant"
26. "Rogues in the House"
27. "Shadows in Zamboula"
28. "Lines Written in the Realization That I Must Die"

== Sources ==
- Jaffery, Sheldon (1989). The Arkham House Companion. Mercer Island, WA: Starmont House, Inc. p. 18. ISBN 1-55742-005-X.
- Chalker, Jack L.; Mark Owings (1998). The Science-Fantasy Publishers: A Bibliographic History, 1923-1998. Westminster, MD and Baltimore: Mirage Press, Ltd. p. 29.
- Nielsen, Leon (2004). Arkham House Books: A Collector's Guide. Jefferson, NC and London: McFarland & Company, Inc. p. 57. ISBN 0-7864-1785-4.
