= Thulsa Doom =

Fictional character by Robert E. Howard

- Kull of Atlantis character
- Thulsa Doom, by Justin Sweet (2006)
- First appearance: "Delcardes' Cat" (submitted in 1928, published in 1967)
- Created by: Robert E. Howard

In-universe information
- Species: Lich
- Gender: Male
- Occupation: Magician

Thulsa Doom is a fictional character created by American author Robert E. Howard, as an antagonist for the character Kull of Atlantis. Thulsa Doom debuted in the story "Delcardes' Cat". He has since appeared in comic books and film as the nemesis of Kull and, later, one of Howard's other creations, Conan the Barbarian.

Thulsa Doom is the prototype for many of the future undead evil wizards in Howard's stories, such as Tsotha-Lanti (in the Conan saga) and Kathulos (in the Skull Face novelette); other living or revenant Howardian practitioners of magic such as Thoth Amon, Thugra Khotan, Kathulos, and Xaltotun bear some psychological similarities to Thulsa Doom even if their actual appearance is vastly different.

== In pulp magazines ==
Thulsa Doom first appeared (as Thulses Doom) at the end of the short story "Delcardes' Cat" by Robert E. Howard, which featured the character Kull as the protagonist. Howard later edited the text to include foreshadowing/references to Thulsa Doom (as he had been renamed) throughout the story and changed the title to The Cat and the Skull to reflect this. Editor Patrice Louinet speculated that this change was because Howard had originally intended Kuthulos (whom Doom impersonated in this story) to be the actual villain before coming up with Thulsa Doom near the story's completion. This version was submitted to Weird Tales in 1928, but it was not accepted. The story did not see print until 1967 in the paperback King Kull published by Lancer Books.

Thulsa Doom is described by Howard in "The Cat and the Skull" as having a face "like a bare white skull, in whose eye sockets flamed livid fire". He is seemingly invulnerable, boasting after being trampled by one of Kull's comrades that he feels "only a slight coldness" when being injured and will only "pass to some other sphere when [his] time comes".

As Thulsa Doom's original story was not published in Howard's lifetime he reused the character as "Kathulos of Atlantis" in his 1929 story Skull-Face.

== In comic books ==
A powerful necromancer, Thulsa Doom is a primary foe of Kull. His first appearance was in Monsters on the Prowl #16. He was often a featured foe in the Marvel Kull comics (for instance, Kull the Conqueror #3 and #7). Thulsa Doom returns in Kull the Conqueror #11, "By This Axe I Rule", based on an original story by Robert E. Howard. Posing as the nobleman Ardyon, he forms an alliance with four rebels within Valusia: the dwarfish Ducalon, the soldier Enaros, Baron Kanuub, and the minstrel Ridondo, who actually dethroned the hero, and set him on a quest to regain his lost kingdom, in the pages of his own comic, until it was cancelled. Kull resumes his quest in the pages of Kull and the Barbarians, a black-and-white Marvel magazine format (published under the Curtis Magazines imprint). Thulsa Doom sent members of his Black Legion to ambush Kull and Brule, though they won the fight. Thulsa observed the battle through a magic crystal. Kull and Brule's ship was later attacked by a sea serpent, with which Thulsa may or may not have had anything to do.

Kull and the Barbarians lasted for three issues until it was cancelled. In the return of Kull the Destroyer, Thulsa Doom/Ardyon learned of the Curse of Torranna (essentially, if a scarred man wore the crown and sat on the throne, he would be unable to ever leave the throne), which he determined to bestow upon Kull. To this end, he took on the aspect of the god of Torranna and advised its inhabitants how best to bring this about. Thulsa Doom manipulated Garn-Nak, Karr-Lo-Zann, and Norra of Torranna. They drew Kull into Torranna and had him undergo a series of trials to gain the crown of Torranna. Kull sought the crown because he believed he could use the army of Torranna to help him retake the crown of Valusia from Thulsa Doom.

In Kull the Destroyer #28, Kull successfully completed the last of the trials, but before he could don the crown, Norra warned him of the Curse of Torranna. Thulsa Doom allowed Norra's age to catch up with her, turning her into a shriveled corpse, and then revealed himself to Kull, challenging him to one final battle. In the next issue (also the final issue of the Kull the Destroyer title), Thulsa Doom pulled Kull into a pocket dimension for their final battle. Kull managed to slash Thulsa Doom's face with his sword, but was ultimately overpowered by the necromancer. Thulsa Doom returned them both to Torranna, but Kull rallied long enough to push Thulsa Doom onto the throne and place the crown on his head. His face scarred by Kull, Thulsa fulfilled the prophecy and fell victim to the curse himself. Thulsa's powers were drained by his curse as the city of Torranna collapsed, seemingly crushing him. Kull, luckily, escaped, and then returned to Valusia to retake his own throne.

Kull would face Thulsa Doom at least one more time, in the pages of Marvel Preview #19 (summer 1979 issue). The script for that issue was an adaptation of the prose tale "Riders Beyond the Sunrise", itself the completion by writer Lin Carter of an untitled fragment written by R. E. Howard. Thulsa Doom appears to finally perish at the climax of this story, but he would eventually return as a Conan villain in the pages of Conan and a few issues of Conan's black-and-white magazine, Savage Sword of Conan (issues #190–193). He's apparently immortal and is visualized as a skull-headed sorcerer, or as an albino when taking on the illusory appearance of a living man. A similar concept of an undead sorcerer can also be found in the lich from Dungeons & Dragons and other works of fantasy fiction, such as The Sword and the Sorcerer.

American company Dynamite Entertainment published a Thulsa Doom mini-series written by Arvid Nelson, with art by Lui Antonio, for a total of four issues in 2009.

== Against Cormac Mac Art ==
Thulsa Doom later becomes an enemy of the Celtic hero Cormac Mac Art, another Howard character further expanded by Andrew J. Offutt.

Set in the time of King Arthur (though Arthur himself doesn't appear onstage) Thulsa Doom comes back to life after 18,000 years on a sinister deserted island. Recognizing Cormac Mac Art – an Irish adventurer who joined a band of Danish Vikings – as a reincarnation of his old enemy King Kull, Thulsa Doom immediately resumes his ancient vendetta and relentlessly seeks to kill Mac Art.

As depicted by Offutt, Thulsa Doom possess remarkable shape-changing powers, being able to take not only the form but also the precise mannerisms of Cormac mac Art's close friends. This includes also a perfect sex change ability. On one occasion, Thulsa Doom is able to perfectly imitate Cormac mac Art's girlfriend, speak convincing words of love to a man who knows her well and is in love with her, and engage in full-fledged sex – with the intention of taking Mac Art by surprise and suddenly drawing steel. However, at the moment of his attack, Thulsa Doom shows his true skull face, enabling Mac Art to realize the deception and save himself at the last moment.

Thulsa Doom is also seen as controlling the elements and being able to call up a storm out of a calm sea.

While Thulsa Doom cannot be killed – even when pierced by a sword or thrown from a great height – he's vulnerable to steel being driven through his body, such steel acting to imprison him and prevent Doom from getting away.

== Skull-Face ==
Howard's 1929 novella Skull-Face features a resuscitated Atlantean necromancer appearing in the present-day world and seeking to take it over. This villain is very similar to Thulsa Doom, but is named "Kathulos of Atlantis".

== In films ==
James Earl Jones as Thulsa Doom in Conan the Barbarian.

A character of the same name is the main antagonist in the 1982 movie Conan the Barbarian. Played by James Earl Jones, the cinematic Thulsa Doom is considerably different from the literary one, who is described as having a skull-like face. Pre-production drawings showed this version of Thulsa Doom with the skull-like face, but as filmed, he is essentially the classic Conan villain Thoth-Amon, servant of the serpent-god Set. As such, he appears as an ordinary human in the film, though one said to have lived for a thousand years and with the power to transform into an enormous snake. The film earned mixed reviews, but Jones was singled out for praise by some critics who said his performance was reminiscent of Jim Jones, a cult leader whose hold on his followers was such that hundreds of them obeyed his orders to commit suicide.

In July 2008, Dynamite Entertainment announced that Djimon Hounsou signed to co-produce and star as Thulsa Doom in a film version based on the comic books, rather than Robert E. Howard's original incarnation, although the film has not yet been made.
