= The Twilight of the Grey Gods =

Short story by Robert E. Howard

- Short story by Robert E. Howard
- Country: United States
- Language: English
- Genre: Low Fantasy

Publication
- Published in: Dark Mind, Dark Heart
- Publication type: Anthology
- Publisher: Arkham House
- Media type: Print (Hardback)
- Publication date: 1962
- Series: Turlogh Dubh O'Brien

"The Twilight of the Grey Gods", also known as "The Grey God Passes", is a short story by American writer Robert E. Howard that blends history and fantasy. Published posthumously in 1962, the first appearance of the story was in a collection titled Dark Mind, Dark Heart, edited by August Derleth. The tale is a fictionalized version of the Battle of Clontarf (1014) recast in Howard's views, with doomful visions and weird fantasy elements. While the historical facts of the battle are accurate, they are not the most important parts of the story. The protagonist is Conn the Thrall, who fights alongside Turlogh Dubh O'Brien, a recurring character of Howard's who is an outcast from Brian Boru's clan.

Howard first wrote a version of this story called "Spears of Clontarf", but it was rejected by "Soldiers of Fortune" magazine. He then added fantasy elements to the story so as to be able to submit it to the Weird Tales magazine under the title The Grey God Passes, where it was also rejected by editor Farnsworth Wright in December, 1931. He then wrote a third, derivative horror story called The Cairn on the Headland, and that version was published in the January, 1933 issue of Strange Tales.

Howard's first version (as Spears of Clontarf) finally saw print in a chapbook in 1978, and his Grey God Passes version was also published posthumously in the anthology collection titled Dark Mind, Dark Heart in 1962.[1]

== Plot introduction ==
The core of the story, as indicated by the title, is the end of the era of gods and warrior kings. With the victory of Christian King Brian over the enslaving Vikings, at the cost of their own lives, Ireland is freed from bondage and increasingly left in the hands of former slaves. Odin himself makes an impressive and doomful appearance, actively aiding and abetting this changing of the guard.

== Style ==
While little known, this story can be regarded as a turning point in the timeline of Howard's universe. While even in his stories that take place in incredibly ancient times, the horror, supernatural and Cthulhu Mythos elements are seen as survivals from older, more horrible epochs. It can be perceived that in stories that take place later, such elements are viewed as even more horrible and abnormal. (Compare the view of the supernatural in the Kull or Conan the Barbarian stories, with that in the Solomon Kane tales or in The Black Stone or The Children of the Night for instance.) The notable exception being Worms of the Earth where, in the fourth or fifth century, even a hard bitten hero like Bran Mak Morn finds horror beyond his ability to stand.

== Adaptations ==
Twilight of the Grey Gods was adapted by Marvel Comics as a Conan story in Conan the Barbarian #3 ("Twilight of the Grim Grey God", Feb 1971).

Finnish comic book artist Petri Hiltunen adapted the story to an album Harmaan Jumalan Hetki.
