= Bull Dog Breed =

Bull Dog Breed may refer to:

- Bulldog type
- "The Bull Dog Breed", 1930 short story by American writer Robert E. Howard
- Bulldog Breed, 1962 British TV sitcom
- The Bulldog Breed, 1960 British film
