= The Cairn on the Headland =

Short story by Robert E. Howard

"The Cairn on the Headland" is a short story by American writer Robert E. Howard, with elements of fantasy and horror. As often in Howard stories, there is a link to the Cthulhu Mythos, in this case mixed also with elements of both Norse mythology and Catholicism.

It has a rather convoluted history, being in effect an adaptation of Howard's earlier story "Spears of Clontarf", a historical adventure story by Howard focusing on the Battle of Clontarf (1014) and featuring Turlogh Dubh O'Brien or Black Turlogh, a fictional 11th Century Irishman created by Howard. Howard later rewrote "Spears" as "The Grey God Passes", which was very similar to "Spears of Clontarf", but with added fantasy elements. Howard failed to sell the story in either version during his lifetime.

"The Cairn on the Headland" (Howard's third version of "Spears of Clontarf") was a horror story set in the present, and succeeded in getting published in Strange Tales (January, 1933). It was later reprinted in August Derleth's Skull-Face and Others, as well as in Lancer Books' paperback collection Wolfshead.

("The Grey God Passes" was posthumously published in a 1962 Arkham House hardcover Dark Minds, Dark Heart, while "Spears of Clontarf" was finally published in an eponymous 1978 chapbook).

== Plot summary ==
James O'Brien is an Irish-American researcher who specializes in the history of Medieval Ireland - a subject which he is highly well-informed on and has a passionate feeling of partisanship towards. He speaks Gaelic fluently, can read ancient Irish manuscripts or inscriptions in their original state. and is thoroughly familiar with such works as The Book of Leinster, the Great Book of Lecan, and the Annals of the Four Masters.

O'Brien's promising academic career, and his life's work, is threatened by an insidious blackmailer named Ortali. Ortali is now in possession of evidence which could implicate O'Brien in a murder he didn't commit. With this threat hanging over his head, O'Brien must give Ortali much of his salary and the money he got from various academic awards. Ortali enjoys taunting O'Brien and humiliating him.

While visiting Dublin, O'Brien and Ortali discover an ancient cairn on a hillside. The area is shunned by the local citizens, and therefore remains nearly unchanged since the Middle Ages - though the bustle and bright lights of modern Dublin are just around the corner. It's known that the cairn was erected in the aftermath of the 1014 Battle of Clontarf, when Brian Boru liberated his kingdom from an army of Vikings. However, O'brien isn't sure if this structure was erected by the victorious Irish or by the defeated Norse, and who is buried underneath.

Ortali decides on coming back around midnight and dismantle the cairn, in the hope of finding treasure under it. O'Brien strongly objects to Ortali's decision, both because it's a historic landmark and he feels a premonition about what lays beneath it. Ortali ignores O'Brien's advice and his view towards superstition. When O'Brien mentions how local citizens believe holly should never be brought near the cairn, Ortali simply laughs and says he will wear a bundle of holly on his lapel when he returns.

The two also argue about the Battle of Clontarf - O'Brien regarding King Brian Boru as not only having freed Ireland from centuries of Viking oppression, but also having saved all of humanity from the occult worship of the Norse deity Odin, whose followers abandoned their ancestral beliefs and eventually embraced the White Christ. Ortali laughs and scoffs about that, too. The two part in great anger, separately walking back to their hotel. Soon, O'Brien picks up a jagged stone and conceives the idea of killing Ortali with it - even though he would then be charged with a murder of which he would be truly guilty.

Later, O'Brien encounters a mysterious woman, who wears archaic clothing and speaks an ancient version of Gaelic. She introduces herself as Meve MacDonnal and gives O'Brien a golden crucifix, decorated with tiny jewels, of an extremely archaic and unmistakably Celtic workmanship. After a moment, he recognizes it as a legendary relic, the Cross of Saint Brandon, which was considered lost centuries ago.

Shocked and puzzled that MacDonnal would give away such a rare artifact to an absolute stranger, he points out its priceless value. However, MacDonnal scolds O'Brien for placing a monetary value on the cross and explains she gave it to him as a free gift since he would have need of it - and then she disappears behind an alleyway. Suddenly, O'Brien realizes Meve MacDonnal has been dead for three centuries and is buried in a nearby cemetery. The Cross, buried with her, was given to MacDonnal as safekeeping by her uncle, the Bishop Liam O'Brien, who died in 1655. After falling into a troubled sleep, O'Brien relives the Battle of Clontarf - in which he had, himself, taken part in his earlier incarnation as the Irish warrior Red Cumal, a kern in service of King Brian Boru (his nickname derived from his having red hair and beard). Following the Irish victory, Cumal loots the armor and helm of a slain Viking. Surveying the battlefield, he sights a severely wounded and one-eyed Viking chieftain, who is actually the god Odin in human form. Odin has transformed himself into a human so he could aid his followers in battle. However, taking a human form left him vulnerable and he was severely wounded by a spear bearing a cross. Now, Odin is trapped in a mortal body and unable to resume his true form as a malevolent wild spirit.

Mistaking the man for a Viking (due to his red hair, unshaven beard, and Norse armor), Odin begged Cumal to provide him with a bundle of holly - the only substance which could restore him to his spirit form. Soon, Odin is dead (or at least went into a kind of suspended animation). Red Cumal quickly alerts his fellow Irish warriors. Together, they erected a cairn on the hillside, completely covering Odin's body. Cumal quickly warns everyone around him that the cairn must never be disturbed and no holly should ever be placed anywhere near it - thus originating the "Legend" which would survive into the Twentieth Century.

Waking up and finding Ortali missing from the hotel, O'Brien realizes that he might have returned to the cairn and rushes back there. He arrives at the location just in time to witnesses Ortali uncovering the body of Odin, which remains exactly the same as it was when Red Cumal and his allies built the cairn a thousand years earlier. As Ortali bends down, a sprig of holly drops from his lapel onto Odin's corpse. Odin immediately reawakens and comes to monstrous life, shedding his human appearance before transforming into "a fiendish spirit of ice, frost, and darkness", with "the shuddering gleams of the aurora playing around his grisly head". Feeling no gratitude towards Ortali, but rather a deep hatred against all humans, Odin proceeds to kill Ortali with a single bolt of lightning.

Odin quickly turns his attention towards O'Brien. Fortunately, he remembers in time the cross which Meve MacDonnal gave him, holding it high and pointing the relic towards Odin. The cross unleashes a single beam of white light - "unbearably pure, unbearably white" - and the demon shrieks in pain. With a great rush of vulture-like wings, he soared into the stars, dwindling and disappearing.

Soon, O'Brien has survived his encounter, saved Dublin from the demonic fury of Odin, and freed himself of Ortali's blackmail - since police would later determine that Ortali was struck by lightning and no blame attaches to O'Brien. The story never reveals what O'Brien did afterwards with Saint Brandon's Cross.

== Themes ==
Essential to the story are very sharp, polar value judgements. The conflict of Christianity vs. Norse Religion – specifically, Irish Christians vs. Odin-worshiping Vikings – is depicted as no less than Good vs. Evil or Light vs. Darkness. As presented here, Clontarf defined not only the future of Ireland but also the fate of the entire world, the whole of humanity - though other Christians in other places failed to appreciate what Brian Boru and his warriors had done for them. The same point was made by Howard in the related story, "The Twilight of the Grey Gods", whose plot all takes place in 1014 and where the participation of Odin in the battle makes it a Wagnerian Götterdämmerung or Ragnarök.

This perception of Vikings and of the Norse religion as utterly evil is quite at variance with that presented in Tigers of the Sea, where Howard's earlier Irish protagonist Cormac Mac Art joins a Viking band, feels no objection to his Danish comrades-in-arms worshiping Odin, and conversely is not particularly fond of Christianity.

Dorothy Sayers noted the trend of pagan deities sometimes degenerating into Christian demons, as for example the Greek Apollo becoming "The Foul Fiend Apollyon" of The Pilgrim's Progress. Clearly, Odin went through a similar transformation in Howard's story.

Odin being in Howard's interpretation a demon, his banishment at the climax of the story is an effect an exorcism, and it includes many elements of an exorcism as depicted in Christian tradition. Holding out a crucifix is commonly mentioned as an effective method of confronting a demon. According to Christian theology - specifically, Catholic theology - one need not be a clergyman in order to perform an exorcism. However, if one is not especially holy oneself, the chances of overcoming the demon are much increased if one has a holy relic connected to a venerated Saint, thus being able to draw on that Saint's holiness. In all that, O'Brien follows on the well-established rules for carrying out an exorcism - and it works.
