= Dark Mind, Dark Heart =

1962 anthology of horror stories edited by August Derleth

- Dust-jacket illustration by Dale Mann, design by Gary Gore.
- Editor: August Derleth
- Cover artist: Dale Mann
- Language: English
- Genre: Fantasy, horror
- Publisher: Arkham House
- Publication date: 1962
- Publication place: United States
- Media type: Print (hardback)
- Pages: viii, 249

Dark Mind, Dark Heart is an anthology of horror stories edited by American writer August Derleth. It was released in 1962 by Arkham House in an edition of 2,493 copies. The anthology was conceived as a collection of new stories by old Arkham House authors. The anthology includes the first published story by Ramsey Campbell.

== Contents ==
Dark Mind, Dark Heart contains the following tales:

- "Foreword", by August Derleth
- "Under the Horns", by Robert Bloch
- "Come Back, Uncle Ben!", by Joseph Payne Brennan
- "The Church in High Street", by J. Ramsey Campbell
- "Hargraves' Fore-Edge Book", by Mary Elizabeth Counselman
- "Miss Esperson", by Stephen Grendon
- "The Habitants of Middle Islet", by William Hope Hodgson
- "The Grey God Passes", by Robert E. Howard
- "The Aquarium", by Carl Jacobi
- "The Man Who Wanted to Be in the Movies", by John Jakes
- "In Memoriam", by David H. Keller
- "Witches' Hollow", by H. P. Lovecraft and August Derleth
- "The Ideal Type", by Frank Mace
- "The Firing Chamber", by John Metcalfe
- "The Green Vase", by Dennis Roidt
- "Xélucha", by M. P. Shiel
- "The Animals in the Case", by H. Russell Wakefield
- "Caer Sidhi", by George Wetzel

== Sources ==
- Jaffery, Sheldon (1989). The Arkham House Companion. Mercer Island, WA: Starmont House, Inc. p. 62. ISBN 1-55742-005-X.
- Chalker, Jack L.; Mark Owings (1998). The Science-Fantasy Publishers: A Bibliographic History, 1923-1998. Westminster, MD and Baltimore: Mirage Press, Ltd. p. 39.
- Joshi, S.T. (1999). Sixty Years of Arkham House: A History and Bibliography. Sauk City, WI: Arkham House. pp. 76–77. ISBN 0-87054-176-5.
- Nielsen, Leon (2004). Arkham House Books: A Collector's Guide. Jefferson, NC and London: McFarland & Company, Inc. pp. 85–86. ISBN 0-7864-1785-4.
