= Wolfshead =

1926 short story by Robert E. Howard

- Author: Robert E. Howard
- Cover artist: Frank Frazetta
- Language: English
- Genre: Weird fiction, horror, Norse mythology, sword and sorcery, fantasy, supernatural fiction, historical fiction, weird West
- Publisher: Lancer
- Publication date: 1968
- Publication place: United States
- Media type: Print
- Pages: 192

Wolfshead is the title of a short story about lycanthropy by American author Robert E. Howard, first published in the April 1926 issue of pulp magazine Weird Tales, as well as the title of a posthumously-published collection of seven novelettes by the same author, named after the story "Wolfshead", which it includes. The collection spans and blends the genres of weird fiction, horror, Norse mythology, sword and sorcery, fantasy, supernatural fiction, historical fiction and the weird West. It was first published by Lancer. Five of the novelettes had previously been published in the pulp magazine Weird Tales, and one each in Avon Fantasy Reader and Strange Tales.

== Contents ==
- Introduction by Robert E. Howard
- The Black Stone
- The Valley of the Worm
- Wolfshead
- The Fire of Asshurbanipal
- The House of Arabu
- The Horror from the Mound
- The Cairn on the Headland
