= Turlogh Dubh O'Brien =

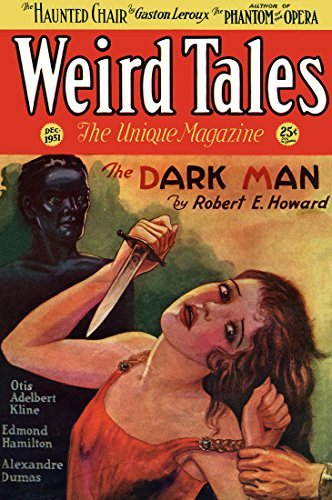
December 1931 issue of the pulp magazine Weird Tales where the story "The Dark Man" was published and featured on the cover.

Turlogh Dubh O'Brien or Black Turlogh, is a fictional 11th Century Irishman created by Robert E. Howard. Turlough is a warrior and an outlaw who has adventures in Ireland and elsewhere. The Turlough Dubh stories are historical adventure stories with fantasy elements; writer Jeffrey Shanks has described the Turlogh Dubh stories as "sword and sorcery".

== Stories ==
- The Gods of Bal-Sagoth (first published in Weird Tales, October 1931) - Also known as The Blond Goddess of Bal-Sagoth, this was written to be a sequel to The Dark Man despite its seeing print before that story. In this story, Turlough is abducted by Vikings and taken to an island in the eastern Atlantic Ocean. This island is the home of the last remnants of a once-powerful empire. This story can be found on Wikisource. It was adapted as a Conan story by Marvel Comics in Conan the Barbarian #17 (Aug 1972) and #18 (Sep 1972) written by Roy Thomas and drawn by Gil Kane.
- The Dark Man (first published in Weird Tales, December 1931) - Turlogh tries to rescue the daughter of his deceased friend King Brian Boru from a tribe of Vikings. This story features a cameo of another Howard character, Bran Mak Morn. This story can be found on Wikisource. It was adapted as a Conan story by Marvel Comics.
- The Shadow of the Hun (an unfinished draft first published posthumously in Shadow of the Hun, 1975) - This story can be found on Wikisource
- Spears of Clontarf (first published posthumously in a Spears of Clontarf chapbook, 1978) - A historical adventure story set against the Battle of Clontarf (1014). Howard later rewrote this unsold story twice. One version, The Grey God Passes, is very similar to Spears of Clontarf with added fantasy elements, and the other The Cairn on the Headland is a modern horror story that Howard saw published in Strange Tales (Jan., 1933).
- The Twilight of the Grey Gods - also known as The Grey God Passes. This is Howard's re-write of Spears of Clontarf (see above) with added fantasy elements (first published posthumously in Dark Mind, Dark Heart, Arkham House, 1962)

In addition to these there is an untitled and unfinished piece that begins "The Dane came in with a rush, hurtling his huge body forward..." This was first published in Shadow of the Hun (1975).
