= Skull-Face =

"Skull-Head"
- Short story by Robert E. Howard
- Country: United States
- Language: English
- Genre: Adventure

Publication
- Published in: Weird Tales
- Publication type: Pulp magazine
- Publication date: Oct–Dec 1929

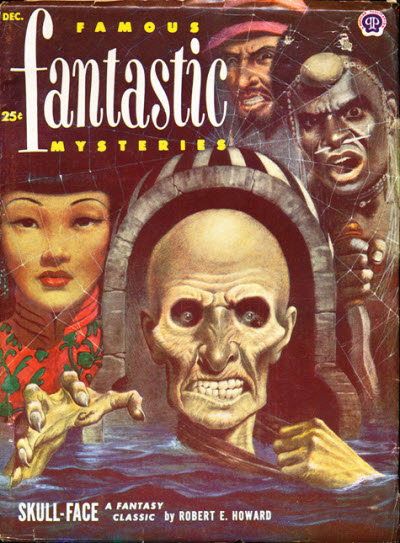
Skull-Face was reprinted as the cover story of the December 1952 issue of Famous Fantastic Mysteries.

Skull-Face is a fantasy-adventure novella by American writer Robert E. Howard, which appeared as a serial in Weird Tales magazine, beginning in October 1929, and ending in December, 1929.

The story stars a character called Stephen Costigan but this is not Howard's recurring character Sailor Steve Costigan whose humorous stories feature an entirely different premise and tone.

The story is set in contemporary London, where Costigan has lived since the end of his European military service in WW1. With the aid of a beautiful Circassian slave woman and an undercover Scotland Yard investigator, Costigan identifies a global conspiracy of drug trafficking and political rebellion. The villainous mastermind claims to be an Egyptian but is later revealed as a resuscitated Atlantean necromancer (similar to Howard’s character Thulsa Doom from the Kull stories). The novella is clearly influenced by Sax Rohmer's stories featuring the antagonist Fu Manchu.
