= Strange Tales (pulp magazine) =

US pulp fantasy magazine

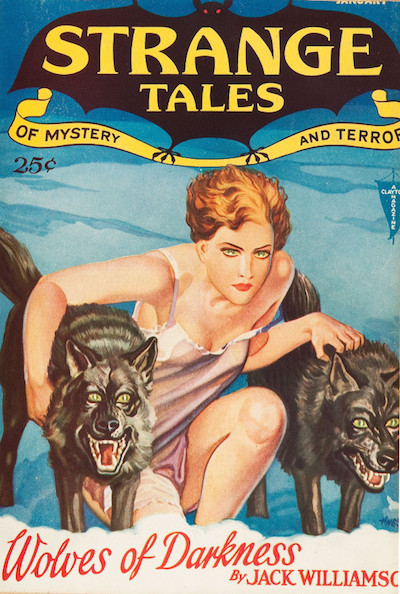
Strange Tales of Mystery and Terror (Jan. 1932). Cover art by Wesso (Hans Wessolowski).

Strange Tales (cover-titled Strange Tales of Mystery and Terror) was an American pulp magazine first published from 1931 to 1933 by Clayton Publications. It specialized in fantasy and weird fiction, and was a significant competitor to Weird Tales, the leading magazine in the field. Its published stories include "Wolves of Darkness" by Jack Williamson, as well as work by Robert E. Howard and Clark Ashton Smith. The magazine ceased publication when Clayton entered bankruptcy. It was temporarily revived by Wildside Press, which published three issues edited by Robert M. Price from 2003 to 2007.

== Publication history and contents ==
Fantasy and occult fiction had often appeared in popular magazines prior to the twentieth century, but the first magazine to specialize in the genre, Weird Tales, appeared in 1923 and by the 1930s was the genre's industry leader. Strange Tales, launched in 1931 by Clayton Publications as a direct rival to Weird Tales, was one of a handful of magazines to seriously challenge for leadership of the field. It was edited by Harry Bates, who also edited Clayton's Astounding Stories of Super Science, which had begun publication the previous year. Strange Tales was launched as a fantasy magazine, but like Weird Tales it often published science-fiction stories, although unlike its rival its focus was on action stories rather than strange ideas. The title was originally planned to be Strange Stories, but Macfadden Publications, who had published True Strange Stories in 1929, challenged the title and forced Clayton to change it.

Bates paid two cents per word, a higher rate than Weird Tales, and attracted noted writers of the day. The magazine published "Wolves of Darkness" by Jack Williamson, "Murgunstruum" by Hugh B. Cave, and "Cassius" by Henry Whitehead. Clark Ashton Smith contributed five stories, including "The Return of the Sorcerer" in the first issue, and Edmond Hamilton and August Derleth also appeared in the magazine. Robert E. Howard, later to become famous as the author of the Conan the Barbarian stories, sent several stories to Strange Tales; some of the stories Bates rejected, such as "The Thing on the Roof" and "The Horror from the Mound", later appeared in Weird Tales, but Bates accepted "The People of the Dark" after asking for revisions, and it was published in the June 1932 issue. Howard also sold "The Valley of the Lost" to Bates, but it had not yet appeared when Clayton went bankrupt, and did not finally see publication until the 1960s.

H.P. Lovecraft submitted several stories to Bates in early 1931, before the first issue had appeared, but the only work of his that appeared in Strange Tales was Henry Whitehead's "The Trap", part of which had been ghostwritten by Lovecraft, and which appeared in the March 1932 issue. In one of Lovecraft's letters he comments that he would not contribute to Strange Tales because "Bates couldn't guarantee me immunity from the copy-slasher's shears and blue pencil", but unpublished letters of his make it clear that his stories were too atmospheric and lacking in action for Bates. Lovecraft's response was dismissive, and he was subsequently contemptuous of both Bates and Clayton in his letters.

The cover art for all seven covers was painted by Hans Wessolowski, under his professional name of "Wesso". Science-fiction historian Robert Weinberg asserts that Strange Tales published better material than Weird Tales during its short run, and fellow historian Mike Ashley regards it as a "close rival" to Weird Tales.

When Clayton went bankrupt in 1933, Astounding Stories was sold to Street & Smith, which planned to revive Strange Tales as well but ultimately did not. Some material acquired for this planned revival appeared in the October 1933 issue of Astounding instead.

Between 2003 and 2007, Wildside Press brought out three further issues, undated and numbered 8 through 10, edited by Robert M. Price. The contents included stories by L. Sprague de Camp, Richard Lupoff, and John Betancourt, and a reprint of "The Devil's Crypt", a story by E. Hoffmann Price that had appeared in Strange Detective Stories.

== Bibliographic details ==
	Jan	Feb	Mar	Apr	May	Jun	Jul	Aug	Sep	Oct	Nov	Dec
1931									1/1		1/2	
1932	1/3		2/1			2/2				2/3		
1933	3/1											
All seven issues of the first run of Strange Tales, showing volume and issue numbers. Harry Bates was editor throughout.

The full title was Strange Tales of Mystery and Terror, and the magazine is sometimes indexed under this title. Each issue was 144 pages long and priced at US$0.25 (equivalent to about $5 in 2025). The seven issues were divided into two volumes of three and a final volume of a single issue. A reprint anthology in facsimile format, also titled Strange Tales, appeared in 1976 from Odyssey Press, edited by Diane Howard, William H. Desmond, John Howard, and Robert K. Wiener. In addition, all stories from the first four issues, and most from the next two, were reprinted in four magazines edited by Robert A.W. Lowndes from the mid-1960s to the early 1970s: Magazine of Horror, Startling Mystery Stories, Weird Terror Tales, and Bizarre Fantasy Tales.

The three Wildside Press revival issues were 112 pages, 92 pages, and 58 pages long, respectively; the size increased with each issue, from digest size, to pulp magazine size, to an oversized magazine size. They were not printed on pulp paper. Between 2004 and 2008 Wildside also reissued three of the original magazines in facsimile format; the issues chosen were dated March and October 1932, and January 1933.

Adventure House has reprinted all 7 issues in facsimile format.

== Sources ==
- Ashley, Mike (1985). "Magazine of Horror". In Tymn, Marshall B.; Ashley, Mike (eds.). Science Fiction, Fantasy, and Weird Fiction Magazines. Westport, Connecticut: Greenwood Press. pp. 391–396. ISBN 0-313-21221-X.
- Ashley, Mike; Contento, William (1995). The Supernatural Index: A Listing of Fantasy, Supernatural, Occult, Weird, and Horror Anthologies. Westport, Connecticut: Greenwood Publishing Group. ISBN 0-313-24030-2.
- Ashley, Mike (1997). "Strange Tales". In Clute, John; Grant, John (eds.). Encyclopedia of Fantasy. New York: St. Martin's Press. ISBN 0-312-15897-1.
- Ashley, Mike (2000). The Time Machines:The Story of the Science-Fiction Pulp Magazines from the beginning to 1950. Liverpool: Liverpool University Press. ISBN 0-85323-865-0.
- Bates, Harry. (2004). Strange Tales January 1933. Rockville Maryland: Wildside Press. ISBN 0-8095-1565-2.
- Bates, Harry. (2005). Strange Tales March 1932. Rockville Maryland: Wildside Press. ISBN 1-55742-457-8.
- Bates, Harry. (2008). Strange Tales October 1932. Rockville Maryland: Wildside Press. ISBN 978-1-4344-6004-2.
- Joshi, S.T.; Schultz, David E. (2001). "Bates, Harry [Hiram Gilmore], III (1900–1981)". An H.P. Lovecraft Encyclopedia. Westport CT: Greenwood Publishing Group. p. 17. ISBN 0-313-31578-7.
- Lord, Glenn (2000). "Robert E. Howard: Professional Writer". The Dark Barbarian: The Writings of Robert E Howard, a Critical Anthology. Gillette New Jersey: Wildside Press. ISBN 1-58715-203-7.
- Murray, Will (1990). "Lovecraft and Strange Tales". Crypt of Cthulhu. 9 (7): 3–11.
- Price, Robert M. (2005). "The Belfry". Strange Tales. 4 (2). Holicong PA: Wildside Press: 3–9.
- "Contents". Strange Tales. 4 (1). Holicong PA: Wildside Press: 1. 2003.
- "Contents". Strange Tales. 4 (2). Holicong PA: Wildside Press: 1. 2005.
- "Contents". Strange Tales. 4 (3). Rockville MD: Wildside Press: 3. 2007.
- Weinberg, Robert (1985a). "Strange Tales of Mystery and Terror". In Tymn, Marshall B.; Ashley, Mike (eds.). Science Fiction, Fantasy, and Weird Fiction Magazines. Westport, Connecticut: Greenwood Press. pp. 626–628. ISBN 0-313-21221-X.
- Weinberg, Robert (1985b). "Weird Tales". In Tymn, Marshall B.; Ashley, Mike (eds.). Science Fiction, Fantasy, and Weird Fiction Magazines. Westport, Connecticut: Greenwood Press. ISBN 0-313-21221-X.
- Weinberg, Robert (1988). A Biographical Dictionary of Science Fiction and Fantasy Artists. Westport, Connecticut: Greenwood Press. ISBN 0-313-24349-2.
