= Sailor Steve Costigan =

Steve Costigan
- First appearance: The Pit of the Serpent (July 1929)
- Created by: Robert E. Howard

In-universe information
- Gender: Male
- Occupation: Able Seaman, Boxer
- Family: "Iron" Mike Costigan (Brother)
- Nationality: American

Sailor Steve Costigan is a fictional character created by American writer Robert E. Howard. He is a merchant sailor on the Sea Girl and is also its champion boxer. His only true companion is a bulldog named Mike (after his brother and fellow boxer, "Iron" Mike Costigan).

Costigan, one of Howard's humorous boxing pulp heroes, roamed the Asiatic seas with fists of steel, a will of iron, and a head of wood. A striking contrast between Howard's barbarians and swordsmen, Costigan was a modern-day character, written in a humorous, Texas tall tale style. The Sailor Steve Costigan stories were very popular in the pages of Fight Stories, Action Stories, and the short-lived Jack Dempsey's Fight Magazine. In a career that was made up largely from writing short stories about recurring characters, Howard wrote more completed stories about Costigan and his pugilistic ilk than about any of his fantasy heroes except Conan the Barbarian.

== Style ==
Howard used understatement and misdirection to create humor. He established Costigan as a most unreliable narrator, a sailor who cannot admit when he has had a lot to drink, does not realize he is a terrible judge of character, and acts before he thinks. These character flaws are the heart of the boxing series and make Costigan as sympathetic as he is hilarious. Told in a jaunty first-person style and in the past tense, the Costigan stories are presented in a slang-riddled, colloquial fashion. Howard grew up in the storytelling tradition of the Southwest and the narrative structure of the Costigan stories mirrors this, especially in the endings, with their humorous stings, inappropriate life lessons, and outright punch lines.

== Dennis Dorgan ==
When Magic Carpet Magazine opened up as a companion to Weird Tales, Howard took some of the unsold Costigan stories and submitted them to the potential new market. The editor of both Magic Carpet and Weird Tales, Farnsworth Wright, was already publishing one story by Robert E. Howard, and requested the author use a pseudonym for the boxing story. Howard chose "Patrick Ervin" for himself, and then not wanting readers to question why someone named Ervin would write about Robert E. Howard's Steve Costigan character from Fight Stories, decided to change his main character's name as well. Howard resurrected the “Dorgan” surname from an earlier boxing story that was changed to a Costigan yarn, and added the more alliterative first name of “Dennis.” Every other character in the story remained the same; the name of the ship, the crew, and the bulldog. Dorgan was little more than a disguise for Costigan. With the pseudonyms in place, Wright accepted four Dennis Dorgan stories. After the fact, Howard changed the name of the Sea Girl to the Python, and the Mike into Spike. Bill O’Brien, Mushy Hanson, and Sven Larson stayed the same.

Only one Dorgan story, “The Alleys of Singapore", however, was published (renamed “Alleys of Darkness”) before Magic Carpet ceased publication as well. Jack Dempsey's Fight Magazine started after that, and Howard managed to place three more Costigan stories before the magazine folded. Fight Stories, after a hiatus of two years, returned as a quarterly magazine in 1934 and continued to reprint the Costigan stories for years after Howard's death, changing the titles and eventually crediting the authorship to their house pseudonym, "Mark Adam".

Despite these characters having different names, Costigan and Dorgan are the same character. They act, speak, and fight in exactly the same way, much like how there is no discernible difference between Howard's humorous western characters Breckenridge Elkins and Pike Bearfield. “Dennis Dorgan” is counted as a separate character only because a number of the unsold Costigan stories were published by Darrell Richardson in the 1970s. Howard himself never really considered that the name Dorgan to be anything other than a pseudonym for Costigan, and went back to Costigan more than once.

== Fictional character biography ==
Steve Costigan is an Irish American from Galveston, Texas (Texas Fists, 1931). He has one brother, Mike, who is also a boxer and has been more successful in this sport than Steve himself (The Bull Dog Breed, 1930). He left Texas to become a sailor, soon becoming an able seaman on the merchant ship Sea Girl (registered in San Francisco, California). While he has worked on other ships, he considers this to be his home.

He has been an amateur boxer since childhood. Steve always likes to be champion of whichever ship or organization of which he is part (Circus Fists, 1931). Subsequently, the only title he really holds is "Champion of the Sea Girl" (which he refers to as "The Fighten'est Ship Afloat"). He found his pet bulldog, Mike, as a stray in Dublin, and named him after his brother (The Bull Dog Breed, 1930). Steve is a heavyweight boxer, weighing 190 lb and standing 6 ft (1.8 m) tall. He has the "Black Irish" combination of blue eyes and black hair.

== Stories ==
=== Steve Costigan stories ===
- "Alleys of Peril" (First printed in Fight Stories, January 1931. Also known as Leather Lightning.)
- "The Battling Sailor" (First printed in Dennis Dorgan, July 1987.)
- "The Pit of the Serpent" (First printed in Fight Stories, July 1929. Also known as Manila Manslaughter.)
- "Blow the Chinks Down!" (First printed in Action Stories, October 1931. Also known as The House of Peril.)
- "Blue River Blues" (First printed in Steve Costigan le Champion, March 1987.)
- "Breed of Battle" (First printed in Action Stories, November 1931. Also known as The Fighten'est Pair, Sampson Had a Soft Spot.)
- "The Bull Dog Breed" (First printed in Fight Stories, February 1930. Also known as You Got to Kill a Bulldog.)
- "By the Law of the Shark" (First printed in REH Fight Magazine #4, October 1996.)
- "Champ of the Forecastle" (First printed in Fight Stories, November 1930. Also known as Champ of the Seven Seas, The Champion of the Forecastle.)
- "Circus Fists" (First printed in Fight Stories, December 1931. Also known as Slugger Bait.)
- "Dark Shanghai" (First printed in Action Stories, January 1932. Also known as One Shanghai Night.)
- "Fist and Fang" (First printed in Fight Stories, May 1930. Also known as Cannibal Fists.)
- "Flying Knuckles" (First printed in REH Fight Magazine #4, October 1996.)
- "General Ironfist" (First printed in Jack Dempsey's Fight Magazine, June 1934.)
- "Hard-Fisted Sentiment" (First printed in REH Fight Magazine #4, October 1996.)
- "The Honor of the Ship" (First printed in REH Fight Magazine #4, October 1996.)
- "Night of Battle" (First printed in Fight Stories, March 1932. Also known as Shore Leave for a Slugger.)
- "Sailor Costigan and the Swami" (First printed in The Howard Review #7, April 1977.)
- "Sailor's Grudge" (First printed in Fight Stories, March 1930. Also known as Costigan vs. Kid Camera.)
- "The Sign of the Snake" (First printed in Action Stories, June 1931.)
- "The Slugger's Game" (First printed in Jack Dempsey's Fight Magazine, May 1934.)
- "Sluggers on the Beach" (First printed in Jack Dempsey's Fight Magazine, August 1934.)
- "Texas Fists" (First printed in Fight Stories, May 1931. Also known as Shanghied Mitts.)
- "The TNT Punch" (First printed in Action Stories, January 1931. Also known as The Waterfront Law, The Waterfront Wallop.)
- "Vikings of the Gloves" (First printed in Fight Stories, February 1932. Also known as Including the Scandinavian.)
- "Waterfront Fists" (First printed in Fight Stories, September 1930. Also known as Stand Up and Slug.)
- "Winner Take All" (First printed in Fight Stories, July 1930. Also known as Sucker Fight.)

=== Dennis Dorgan stories ===
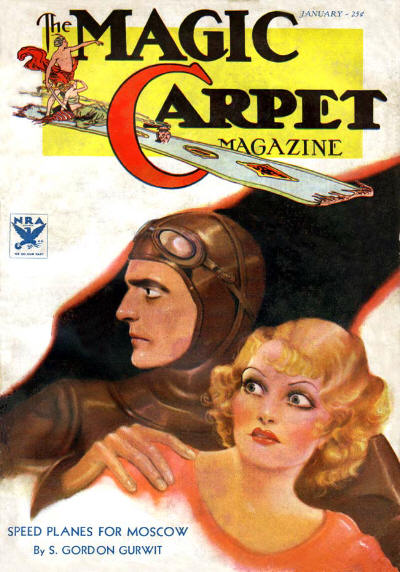
"Alleys of Darkness" was originally published in the final issue of Magic Carpet in 1934

- "Alleys of Darkness" (First printed in Magic Carpet Magazine, January 1934. Also known as Alleys of Singapore. Only Dennis Dorgan story that saw print during Howard's life.)
- "Alleys of Treachery" (First printed in The Howard Collector #8, Summer 1966. Also known as The Mandarin Ruby.)
- "The Destiny Gorilla" (First printed in The Incredible Adventures of Dennis Dorgan (1974). Also known as Sailor Costigan and the Destiny Gorilla and Sailor Dorgan and the Destiny Gorilla.)
- "In High Society" (First printed in The Incredible Adventures of Dennis Dorgan (1974). Also known as Cultured Cauliflowers.)
- "A Knight of the Round Table" (First printed in The Incredible Adventures of Dennis Dorgan (1974). Also known as Iron-Clad Fists.)
- "Playing Journalist" (First printed in The Incredible Adventures of Dennis Dorgan (1974). Also known as A New Game for Costigan and A New Game for Dorgan.)
- "Playing Santa Claus" (First printed in The Incredible Adventures of Dennis Dorgan (1974). Also known as A Two-Fisted Santa Claus.)
- "Sailor Dorgan and the Jade Monkey" (First printed in The Howard Collector #14, Spring 1971. Also known as Sailor Costigan and the Jade Monkey and The Jade Monkey.)
- "The Turkish Menace" (Sold to Magic Carpet Magazine in May 1933, magazine suspended before publication. First printed in The Incredible Adventures of Dennis Dorgan (1974). Also known as Sailor Dorgan and the Turkish Menace and Sailor Costigan and the Turkish Menace.)
- "The Yellow Cobra" (First printed in The Incredible Adventures of Dennis Dorgan (1974). Also known as Sailor Dorgan and the Yellow Cobra, A Korean Night and A Night Ashore.)

=== Skull Face ===
Robert E. Howard wrote the weird menace story "Skull Face" with a main character also called Stephen Costigan. This Costigan is distinct from Sailor Steve Costigan, as the Skull Face version is a drug-addicted former-WW1 soldier suffering from shell shock. "Skull Face" was first printed in Weird Tales, October 1929, in a three part series ending in December, 1929.

== Other characters ==
=== Crew of the Sea Girl ===
- The Old Man: The Welsh owner and captain of the Sea Girl. He is most familiar with the South Pacific and South China Sea. He frequently makes bad bets whilst drunk, which often adds to Steve's problems.
- Mike: Steve's white bulldog and best friend. He has killed several people, often by ripping their throat out. Steve has trained him not to interfere with fights in the ring and not to attack women. Mike largely mirrors Steve's personality.
- Bill O’Brien: Another Irish-American sailor/boxer aboard the Sea Girl. He is Steve's best (human) friend.
- Mushy Hanson: (Over 6 ft (1.8 m), 200 lb) A Danish sailor/boxer aboard the Sea Girl. Mushy is an amateur poet and keeps a collection of Dime novels.
- Sven Larson: (6 ft 4in, 245 lb) A Swedish sailor/boxer who constantly challenges Steve for the title of Champion of the Sea Girl. (Champ of the Forecastle)

=== Opponents ===
- Bat Slade: (5 ft 10in, slightly less than 190lb) Champion of the Dauntless. (The Pit of the Serpent)
- Bert Harper: (6 ft 1in, 198 lb) A sailor acting as a stunt-double in Hollywood. (Sailor's Grudge)
- Big John Clancy: (6 ft 1¾in, 230 lb) Bouncer at Ladeau's American Bar. (The Sign of the Snake)
- Biff Leary: (5 ft 10in, 195 lb) Champion of the Bueno Oro mine. (Texas Fists)
- Bill Brand: (6 ft, 190 lb) An English boxer from the King William. (Hard-Fisted Sentiment)
- Bill Cairn, the Ironville Blacksmith: (6 ft 1¼in, 210 lb) Title contender from Ironville, Nevada. (Circus Fists)
- Bill McGlory: (6 ft, 190 lb) A sailor on the Dutchman. (Blow the Chinks Down!)
- Black Jack O'Brien: (6 ft, 190 lb) Sailor/boxer from the Water Snake. Has black hair and blue eyes like Costigan. (Night of Battle)
- Bucko Brent: (6 ft 1¾in, 189 lb) The brutal, Australian mate of the Nagpur. (The TNT Punch)
- Frenchy Ladeau: (6 ft 1in, 180 lb) A French kickboxer from the S.S. de Comte. Specializes in savate. (Hard-Fisted Sentiment)
- Hakon Torkilsen: (6 ft 1in, 185 lb) Danish champion of the Viking and "Pride of Denmark". (Vikings of the Gloves)
- Joel Ballerin, General Ironfist: (6 ft ½in, 200 lb) Australian mercenary who leads a Chinese rebel army under the name General Feng. (General Ironfist)
- Limey Grieson: (6 ft, 189 lb) Fighter at Ace's. (Breed of Battle)
- Panther Cortez: (6 ft 1in, 185 lb) A sailor on the Water Snake. Has a reputation for fighting dirty. (Winner Take All)
- Red McCoy: (5 ft 8in, 185 lb) Fighter from the Whale. (Alleys of Peril)
- Red Roach: (6 ft 3in, 193 lb) Champion of the Ruffian. A redheaded, cross-eyed southpaw. (Waterfront Fists)
- Shark Murken: (6 ft 2in, 215 lb) Smuggler who controls the island of Barricuda. (By the Law of the Shark)
- Tiger Valois: (6 ft 1½in, 205 lb) The heavyweight champion of the French navy. (The Bull Dog Breed)
- Battling Santos, the Borneo Tiger: (6 ft 1½in, 200 lb) Once famous Solomon Islander boxer. (Fist and Fang)

=== Other ===
- "Iron" Mike Costigan: (5 ft 11in, 195 lb) Steve's brother. He is mentioned but doesn't directly appear in the Sailor Steve Costigan stories.

== Adaptations ==
=== Comics ===
Steve Costigan has been adapted by Titan Comics in The Savage Sword of Conan #10 released in September 2025. The story was written by Jim Zub with art by Rob De La Torre and is connected to the "Scourge of the Serpent" storyline. In the story Costigan fights a criminal gang in possession of the ring of Thoth-Amon and a boxer named Pervaiz the Python while on shore leave in Singapore.

=== Books ===
In 2026, the Steve Costigan world was expanded in a novel by Andrew Rihn, Aboard the Old Buoy, published by Cornerstone Press. Set in 1955, Aboard the Old Buoy gives Sailor Steve Costigan a son, Steve Jr. We learn the original Sailor Steve Costigan now lives on a ranch in Cross Plains, TX, with his brother Mike and Mike's wife, Myrna. Steve Jr. was born in Ireland, where the novel says Sailor Steve lived briefly after his Asiatic sailing was over. In Ireland, Sailor Steve got married and had a child, Steve Jr. When his wife was killed in a bar brawl, Sailor Steve returned to America to raise his infant son on his brother's Texas ranch.

The novel is told through letters, mostly from Steve Jr., as he sails Caribbean and South American seas. Steve Costigan Jr, gets cursed in New Orleans, fights a three-on-one battle royale in Havana, is stabbed by gangsters in Colombia, spars a robot in Ecuador, and stumbles onto a blood sacrifice in Chile. Rihn has said that his stories try to "embrace the pulp ethos—adventure, action, violence, melodrama, sex."

== See also ==
- List of works by Robert E. Howard
