= Robert E. Howard =

American pulp fiction writer (1906–1936)

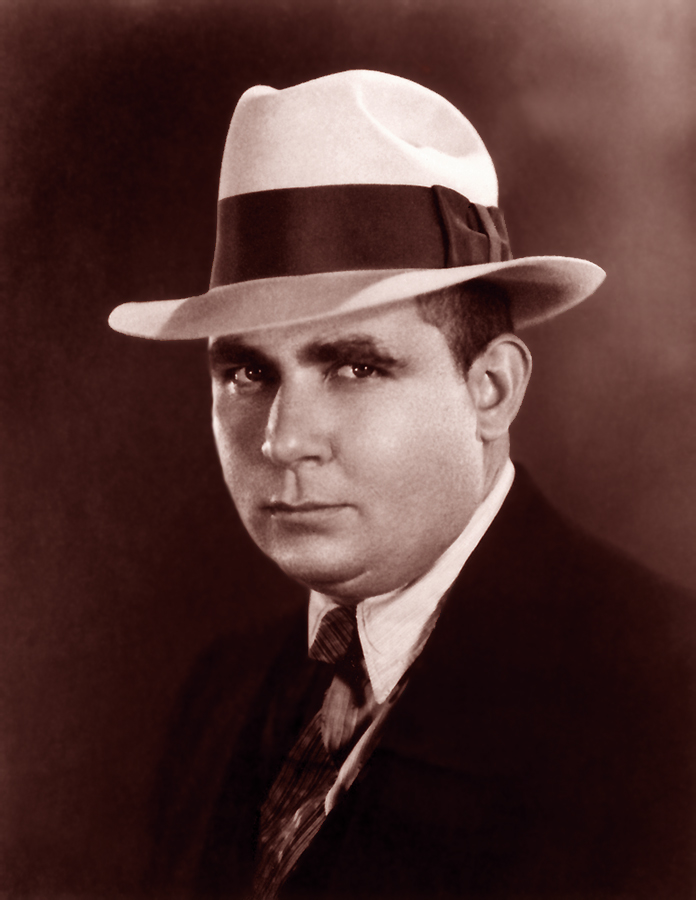
- Howard in 1934
- Born: Robert Ervin Howard; January 22, 1906; Peaster, Texas, U.S.
- Died: June 11, 1936 (aged 30); Cross Plains, Texas, U.S.
- Other names: REH, Two-Gun Bob (Note: Fans of Howard frequently refer to him by his initials, REH. His friend H. P. Lovecraft gave him the nickname "Two-Gun Bob" due to his knowledge about the Old West and Texas in particular.)
- Occupations: Short story writer; poet; novelist; epistolean
- Writing career
- Pen name: Patrick Mac Conaire, Steve Costigan, Patrick Ervin, Patrick Howard, Sam Walser (Note: Patrick Mac Conaire was used once as the pen name for the story "Ghost in the Doorway". Steve Costigan was the name Howard used for himself in his semi-autobiography Post Oaks & Sand Roughs. Patrick Ervin was an occasional pen name, especially for the Dennis Dorgan stories. Patrick Howard was a pen name used for some of Howard's poetry. Sam Walser was a pen name used for the Wild Bill Clanton stories. Because some pulp magazines used house names, especially when reprinting older works, Howard was also credited as: Mark Adam, William Decatur, R. T. Maynard, and Max Nielson. Ghost Stories used John Taverel as the author's name for "The Apparition in the Prize Ring", to make it seem to be a true story.)
- Genres: Sword and sorcery, dark fantasy, historical, western, horror, boxing stories, southern gothic, detective fiction
- Notable works: Conan the Cimmerian (series), Solomon Kane (series), Bran Mak Morn, King Kull, El Borak, The Shadow of the Vulture
- Movements: Sword and sorcery, weird fiction

Robert Ervin Howard (January 22, 1906 – June 11, 1936) was an American author, known for writing pulp fiction in a diverse range of genres. He created the character Conan the Barbarian and is regarded as the father of the sword and sorcery subgenre.

Howard was born and raised in Texas. He spent most of his life in the town of Cross Plains, with some time spent in nearby Brownwood. A bookish and intellectual child, he was also a fan of boxing, eventually taking up amateur boxing; he also spent some time in his late teens bodybuilding. From the age of nine, he wanted to become an adventure fiction writer but did not have real success until he was 23. Thereafter Howard's writings were published in a wide selection of magazines, journals, and newspapers, and he became proficient in several subgenres. He died by suicide at age 30 while distraught over his mother's imminent death.

Although a Conan novel was nearly published in 1934, Howard's stories were never collected during his lifetime. The main outlet for his stories was Weird Tales, where Howard created Conan the Barbarian. It was only after his death that his writings were collected and more widely read. With Conan and his other heroes, Howard helped create the sword and sorcery genre, spawning many imitators and giving him a large influence in the fantasy field.

== Biography ==
=== Early years ===
Howard was born January 22, 1906, in Peaster, Texas, the only son of a traveling country physician, Dr. Isaac Mordecai Howard, and his wife, Hester Jane Ervin Howard. (Note: Grin (2006, pp. 13–18): Contains facsimile reproductions of Howard's birth certificate and death record.) (Note: Finn (2006, p. 26) notes that the birth record incorrectly shows Howard's birthdate as January 24, in addition to altering his mother's age.) (Note: Burke (3rd paragraph): notes that Howard celebrated his birthday on the 22nd rather than the 24th, as recorded in Parker County records. His father also gave his birthday as January 22.) His early life was spent wandering through a variety of Texas cowtowns and boomtowns: Dark Valley (1906), Seminole (1908), Bronte (1909), Poteet (1910), Oran (1912), Wichita Falls (1913), Bagwell (1913), Cross Cut (1915), and Burkett (1917).

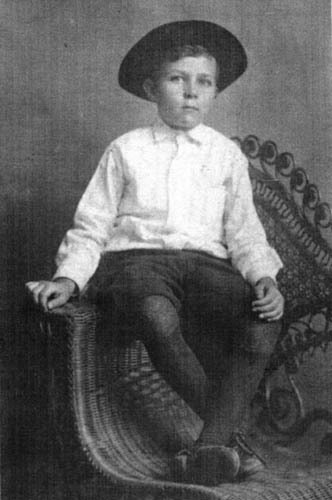
Robert E. Howard at about five years old (circa 1911)

His parents' relationship began to break down during his youth. The Howard family had problems with money, which might have been exacerbated by Isaac Howard investing in get-rich-quick schemes. Hester Howard, meanwhile, came to believe that she had married below herself. Soon, the pair were actively fighting. Hester did not want Isaac to have anything to do with their son. She had a particularly strong influence on her son's intellectual growth. She had spent her early years helping a variety of sick relatives, contracting tuberculosis in the process. She instilled in her son a deep love of poetry and literature, recited verse daily, and supported him unceasingly in his efforts to write.

Although he loved reading and learning, he found school to be confining and began to resent authority. Experiences watching and confronting bullies revealed the omnipresence of evil and enemies in the world, and taught him the value of physical strength and violence. As the son of the local doctor, Howard had frequent exposure to the effects of injury and violence, due to accidents on farms and oil fields combined with increasing crime rates from the oil boom. Firsthand tales of gunfights, lynchings, feuds, and Indian raids developed his distinctly Texan, hardboiled outlook on the world. Sports, especially boxing, became a passionate preoccupation. At the time, boxing was the most popular sport in the country, with a cultural influence far in excess of what it is today. James J. Jeffries, Jack Johnson, Bob Fitzsimmons, and later Jack Dempsey were the names that inspired him during those years, and he grew up a lover of all contests of violent, masculine struggle.

=== First writings ===
Voracious reading, along with a natural talent for prose writing and the encouragement of teachers, created in Howard an interest in becoming a professional writer. From the age of nine he began writing stories, mostly tales of historical fiction centering on Vikings, Arabs, battles, and bloodshed. One by one he discovered the authors who would influence his later work: Jack London and his stories of reincarnation and past lives, most notably The Star Rover (1915); Rudyard Kipling's tales of subcontinent adventures; the classic mythological tales collected by Thomas Bulfinch. Howard was considered by friends to be eidetic, and astounded them with his ability to memorize lengthy reams of poetry with ease after one or two readings.

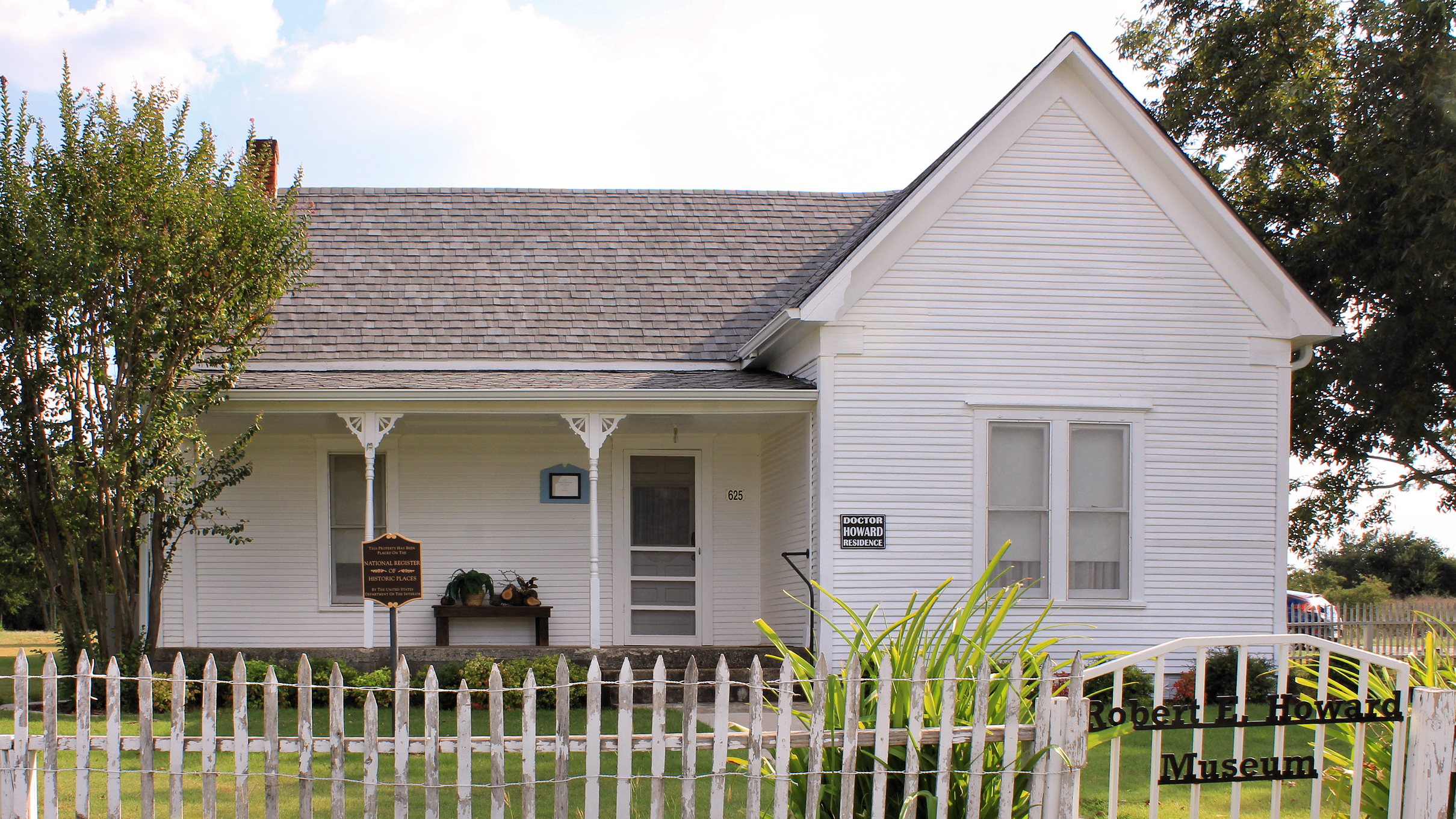
The Robert E. Howard Museum in Cross Plains, Texas

In 1919, when Howard was thirteen, Dr. Howard moved his family to the Central Texas hamlet of Cross Plains, and there the family would stay for the rest of Howard's life. Howard's father bought a house in the town with a cash down payment and made extensive renovations. That same year, sitting in a library in New Orleans while his father took medical courses at a nearby college, Howard discovered a book concerned with the scant fact and abundant legends surrounding an indigenous culture in ancient Scotland called the Picts.

In 1920, the Vestal Well within the limits of Cross Plains struck oil causing the Cross Plains to become an oil boomtown. Thousands of people arrived in the town looking for oil wealth. New businesses developed from scratch whilst crime rates also increased. Cross Plains' population quickly grew from 1,500 to 10,000. It suffered overcrowding, the traffic ruined its unpaved roads, and vice crime exploded, but it also spent its new wealth on civic improvements such as a new school, an ice manufacturing plant, and new hotels. Howard hated the boom and despised the people who came with it. He was already poorly disposed towards oil booms, as they were the cause of the constant traveling in his early years, but this was aggravated by what he perceived to be the effect oil booms had on towns.

"I'll say one thing about an oil boom; it will teach a kid that Life's a pretty rotten thing as quick as anything I can think of."

— Robert E. Howard in a letter to Weird Tales editor Farnsworth Wright, Summer 1931.

At fifteen, Howard first sampled pulp magazines, especially Adventure and its star authors Talbot Mundy and Harold Lamb. The next few years saw him creating a variety of series characters. Soon, he was submitting stories to magazines such as Adventure and Argosy. Rejections piled up, and with no mentors or instructions to aid him, Howard became a writing autodidact, methodically studying the markets and tailoring his stories and style to each.

In the fall of 1922, when Howard was sixteen, he temporarily moved to a boarding house in the nearby city of Brownwood to complete his senior year of high school, accompanied by his mother. It was in Brownwood that he first met friends his own age who shared his interest not only for sports and history but also writing and poetry. The two most important of these, Tevis Clyde Smith and Truett Vinson, shared his Bohemian and literary outlook on life, and together they wrote amateur papers and magazines, exchanged long letters filled with poetry and existential thoughts on life and philosophy, and encouraged each other's writing endeavors. Through Vinson, Howard was introduced to The Tattler: the newspaper of the Brownwood High School. It was in this publication that Howard's stories were first printed. The December 1922 issue featured two stories: "'Golden Hope Christmas", and "West is West", which won gold and silver prizes respectively.

Howard graduated from high school in May 1923 and moved back to Cross Plains. On his return to his home town, he engaged in a self-created regimen of exercise, including cutting down oak trees and chopping them into firewood every day, lifting weights, punching a bag, and springing exercises, eventually building himself from a skinny teenager into a more muscled form.

=== Professional writer ===
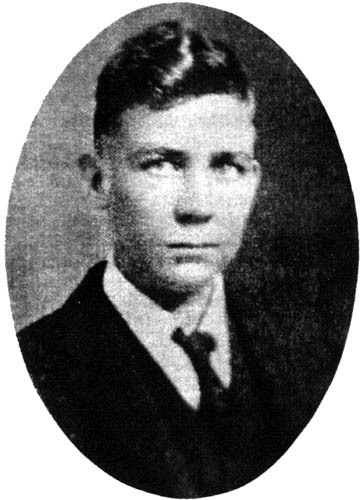
Robert E. Howard in his Senior Year at Brownwood High School, 1923

Howard spent his late teens working odd jobs around Cross Plains, all of which he hated. In 1924, Howard returned to Brownwood to take a stenography course at Howard Payne College, this time boarding with his friend Lindsey Tyson instead of his mother. Howard would have preferred a literary course but was not allowed to take one. The reason for this is undocumented; however, biographer Mark Finn suggests that his father refused to pay for such a non-vocational education. In the week of Thanksgiving that year, and after years of rejection slips and near acceptances, he finally sold a short caveman tale titled "Spear and Fang", which netted him the sum of $16 (equivalent to $301 in 2025) and introduced him to the readers of a struggling pulp magazine called Weird Tales.

Now that his career in fiction had begun, Howard dropped out of Howard Payne College at the end of the semester and returned to Cross Plains. Shortly afterwards, he received notice that another story, "The Hyena", had been accepted by Weird Tales. During the same period, Howard made his first attempt to write a novel, a loosely autobiographical book modeled on Jack London's Martin Eden and titled Post Oaks & Sand Roughs. The book was otherwise of middling quality and was never published in the author's lifetime, but it is of interest to Howard scholars for the personal information it contains. Howard's alter ego in this novel is Steve Costigan, a name he would use more than once in the future. The novel was finished in 1928, but not published until long after his death.

Weird Tales paid on publication, meaning that Howard had no money of his own at this time. To remedy this, he took a job writing oil news for the local newspaper Cross Plains Review at $5 (equivalent to $92 in 2025) per column. It was not until July 1925 that Howard received payment for his first printed story. Howard lost his job at the newspaper in the same year and spent one month working in a post office before quitting over the low wages. His next job, at the Cross Plains Natural Gas Company, did not last long due to his refusal to be subservient to his boss. He did manual labor for a surveyor for a time before beginning a job as a stenographer for an oil company.

In conjunction with his friend Tevis Clyde Smith, he dabbled heavily in verse, writing hundreds of poems and getting dozens published in Weird Tales and assorted poetry journals. With poor sales, and many publishers recoiling from his subject matter, Howard ultimately judged poetry writing a luxury he could not afford, and after 1930 he wrote little verse, instead dedicating his time to short stories and higher-paying markets. Nevertheless, as a result of this apprenticeship, his stories increasingly took on the aura of "prose-poems" filled with hypnotic, dreamy imagery and a power lacking in most other pulp efforts of the time.

Further story sales to Weird Tales were sporadic but encouraging, and soon Howard was a regular in the magazine. His first cover story was for "Wolfshead", a werewolf story published when he was only twenty. On reading "Wolfshead" in Weird Tales Howard became dismayed with his writing. He quit his stenographer's job to work at Robertson's Drug Store, where he rose to become head soda jerk on $80 (equivalent to $1,455 in 2025) per week. However, he resented the job itself and worked such long hours every day of the week that he became ill. He relaxed by visiting the Neeb Ice House, to which he was introduced by an oil field worker befriended at the drug store. There, he drank and took part in boxing matches. These matches became an important part of his life - the combination of boxing and writing provided an outlet for his frustrations and anger.

=== Sword and sorcery ===
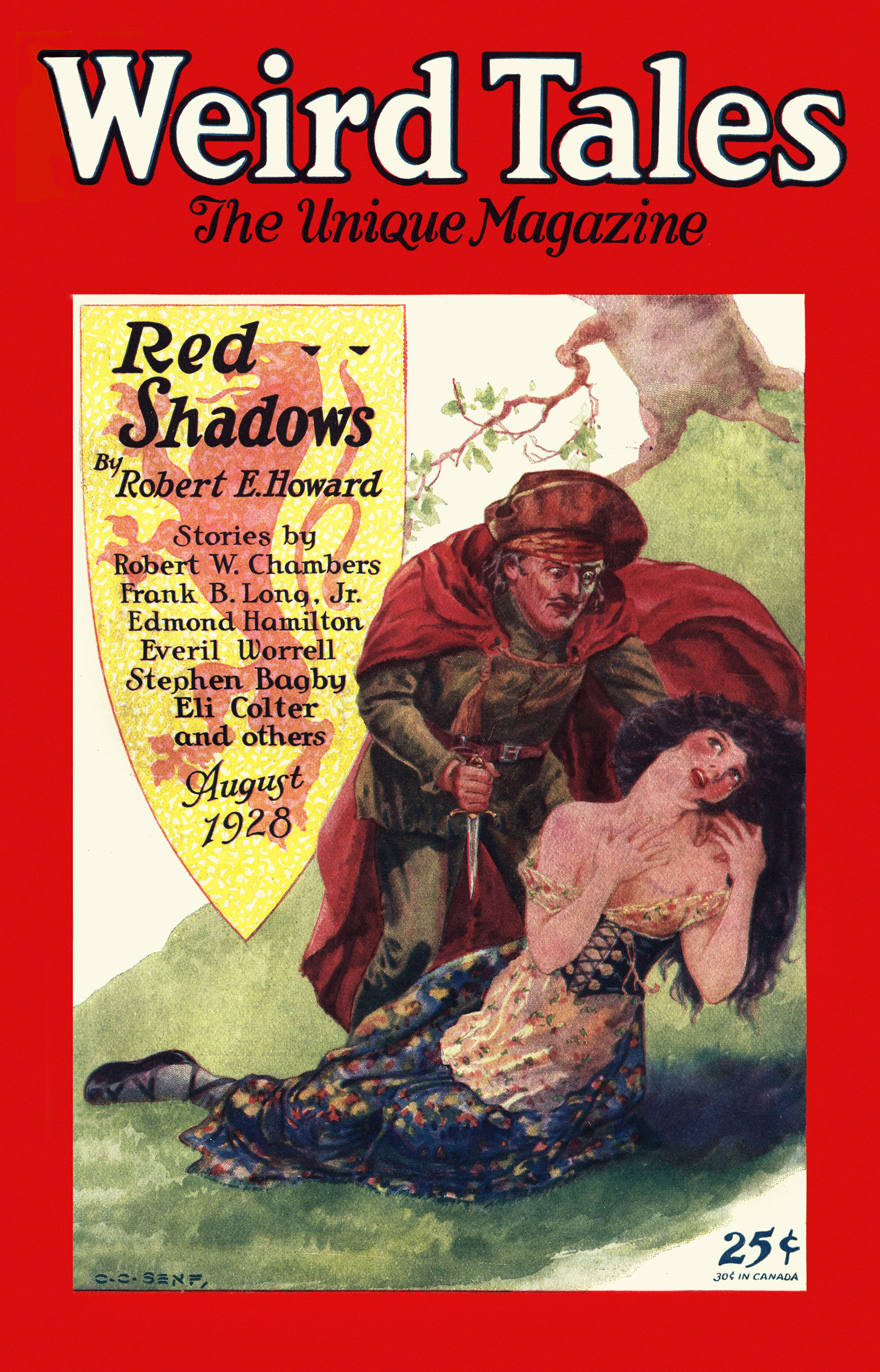
Weird Tales (August 1928) featuring "Red Shadows", the first Solomon Kane story

In August 1926, Howard quit his exhausting job at the drug store and, in September, returned to Brownwood to complete his bookkeeping course. It was during this August that he began working on the story that would become "The Shadow Kingdom": one of the most important works of his career. While at college, Howard wrote for their newspaper: The Yellow Jacket. One of the short stories printed in this newspaper was a comedy called "Cupid vs. Pollux". This story is Howard's earliest surviving boxing story known to exist; it is told in the first person, uses elements of a traditional tall-tale, and is a fictionalized account of Howard (as "Steve") and his friend Lindsey Tyson (as "Spike") training for a fight. This story and the elements it uses would also be important in Howard's literary future.

In May 1927, after having to return home due to contracting measles and then being forced to retake the course, Howard passed his exams. While waiting for the official graduation in August, he returned to writing, including a re-write of "The Shadow Kingdom". He rewrote it again in August and submitted it to Weird Tales in September. This story was an experiment with the entire concept of the "weird tale" horror fiction as defined by practitioners such as Edgar Allan Poe, A. Merritt, and H. P. Lovecraft, mixing elements of fantasy, horror, and mythology with historical romance, action, and swordplay into thematic vehicles never before seen: a new style of tale that ultimately became known as "sword and sorcery". (Note: Joshi & Dziemianowicz (2005, p. 1095): "Critical consensus, however, unfailingly places the birth of sword-and-sorcery with the publication of 'The Shadow Kingdom' (August 1929), in which Howard introduced the brooding figure of King Kull, ruling over the fading land of Valusia in a Pre-Cataclysmic Age when Atlantis is but newly risen from the waves.") (Note: Gramlich (2005, p. 780): "The term 'sword and sorcery' was coined by Fritz Leiber but the genre was pioneered by Robert E. Howard, a Texas pulp writer who combined fantasy, history, horror, and the Gothic to create the Hyborian Age and such characters as Conan the Conqueror and Kull.") Featuring Kull, a barbarian precursor to later Howard heroes such as Conan, the tale hit Weird Tales in August 1929 and received fanfare from readers. Weird Tales editor Farnsworth Wright bought the story for $100 (equivalent to $1,900 in 2025), the most Howard had earned for a story at this time, and several more Kull stories followed. All but two were rejected, convincing Howard not to continue the series.

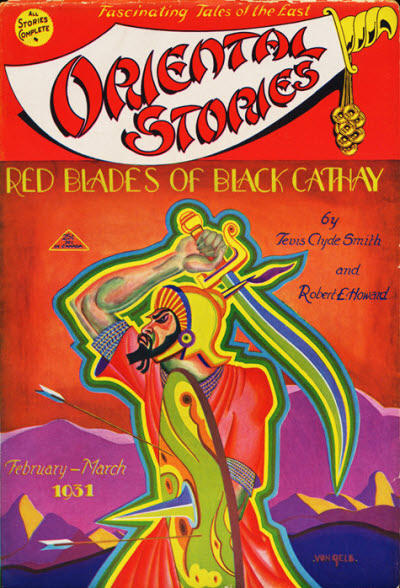
Oriental Stories (Feb–Mar 1931) featuring "Red Blades of Black Cathay" by Howard and his best friend Tevis Clyde Smith

In March 1928, Howard salvaged and re-submitted to Weird Tales a story rejected by the more popular pulp Argosy, and the result was "Red Shadows", the first of many stories featuring the vengeful Puritan swashbuckler Solomon Kane. Appearing in the August 1928 issue of Weird Tales, the character was a big hit with readers and this was the first of Howard's characters to sustain a series in print beyond just two stories, with seven Kane stories printed from 1928 to 1932. As the magazine published the Solomon Kane tale before Kull, this can be considered the first published example of sword and sorcery.

During 1929, Howard broke out into other pulp markets, rather than just Weird Tales. The first story he sold to another magazine was "The Apparition in the Prize Ring", a boxing-related ghost story published in the magazine Ghost Stories. In July of the same year, Argosy finally published one of Howard's stories, "Crowd-Horror", which was also a boxing story. Neither developed into ongoing series.

After several minor successes and false starts, he struck gold again with a new series based on one of his favorite passions: boxing. July 1929 saw the debut of Sailor Steve Costigan in the pages of Fight Stories. A tough-as-nails, two-fisted mariner with a head of rocks and occasionally a heart of gold, Costigan began boxing his way through a variety of exotic seaports and adventure locales, becoming so popular in Fight Stories that the same editors began using additional Costigan episodes in their sister magazine Action Stories. The series saw a return to Howard's use of humor and (unreliable) first-person narration, with the combination of a traditional tall tale and slapstick comedy. Stories sold to Fight Stories provided Howard with a market just as stable as Weird Tales.

Due to his success in Fight Stories, Howard was contacted by the publisher Street & Smith in February 1931 with a request to move the Steve Costigan stories to their own pulp Sport Story Magazine. Howard refused but created a new, similar series just for them based on a boxer called Kid Allison. Howard wrote ten stories for this series, but Sport Story published only three of them.

With solid markets now all buying up his stories regularly, Howard quit taking college classes, and would never again work a regular job. At twenty-three years of age, from the middle of nowhere in Texas, he had become a full-time writer. He was making good money, and his father began bragging about his success, not to mention buying multiple copies of his work in the pulps.

Howard's "Celtic phase" began in 1930, during which he became fascinated by Celtic themes and his own Irish ancestry. He shared this enthusiasm with Harold Preece: a friend made in Austin in the summer of 1927. Howard's letters to both Preece and Clyde Smith contain much Irish-related material and discussion. Howard taught himself a little Gaelic, examined the Irish parts of his family history, and began writing about Irish characters. Turlogh Dubh O'Brien and Cormac Mac Art were created at this time, although he was unable to sell the latter's stories.

When Farnsworth Wright started a new pulp in 1930 called Oriental Stories, Howard was overjoyed—here was a venue where he could run riot through favorite themes of history and battle and exotic mysticism. During the four years of the magazine's existence, he crafted some of his best tales, gloomy vignettes of war and rapine in the Middle and Far East during the Middle Ages and the early Renaissance, tales that rival even his best Conan stories for their historical sweep and splendor. In addition to series characters such as Turlogh Dubh O'Brien and Cormac Fitzgeoffrey, Howard sold a variety of tales depicting various times and periods from the fall of Rome to the fifteenth century. The magazine eventually ceased publication in 1934 due to the Depression, leaving several of Howard's stories aimed at this market unsold.

=== Lovecraft Circle ===
In August 1930 Howard wrote a letter to Weird Tales praising a recent reprint of H. P. Lovecraft's "The Rats in the Walls" and discussing some of the obscure Gaelic references used within. Editor Farnsworth Wright forwarded the letter to Lovecraft, who responded warmly to Howard, and soon the two Weird Tales veterans were engaged in a vigorous correspondence that would last for the rest of Howard's life. By virtue of this, Howard quickly became a member of the "Lovecraft Circle", a group of writers and friends all linked via the immense correspondence of H. P. Lovecraft (who wrote over 100,000 letters in his lifetime), who made it a point to introduce his many like-minded friends to one another and encourage them to share stories, utilize each other's invented fictional trappings, and help each other succeed in the pulp field. In time this circle of correspondents has developed a legendary patina about it rivaling similar literary conclaves such as The Inklings, the Bloomsbury Group, and the Beats. (Note: Herron (2004, pp. 161–162): "Suddenly one Golden Age in literature had drawn to a close...For just over a decade these three [REH, CAS, and HPL] had created a phenomenal array of new imaginative fiction and poetry...In these same years another Golden Age played out in the detective pulp The Black Mask...In England, C. S. Lewis, J.R.R. Tolkien and others called their group centered in Oxford University The Inklings...the Bloomsbury Group, which flourished from 1904 until World War II, form yet another. So do the American poets and novelists who became known as The Beats...")

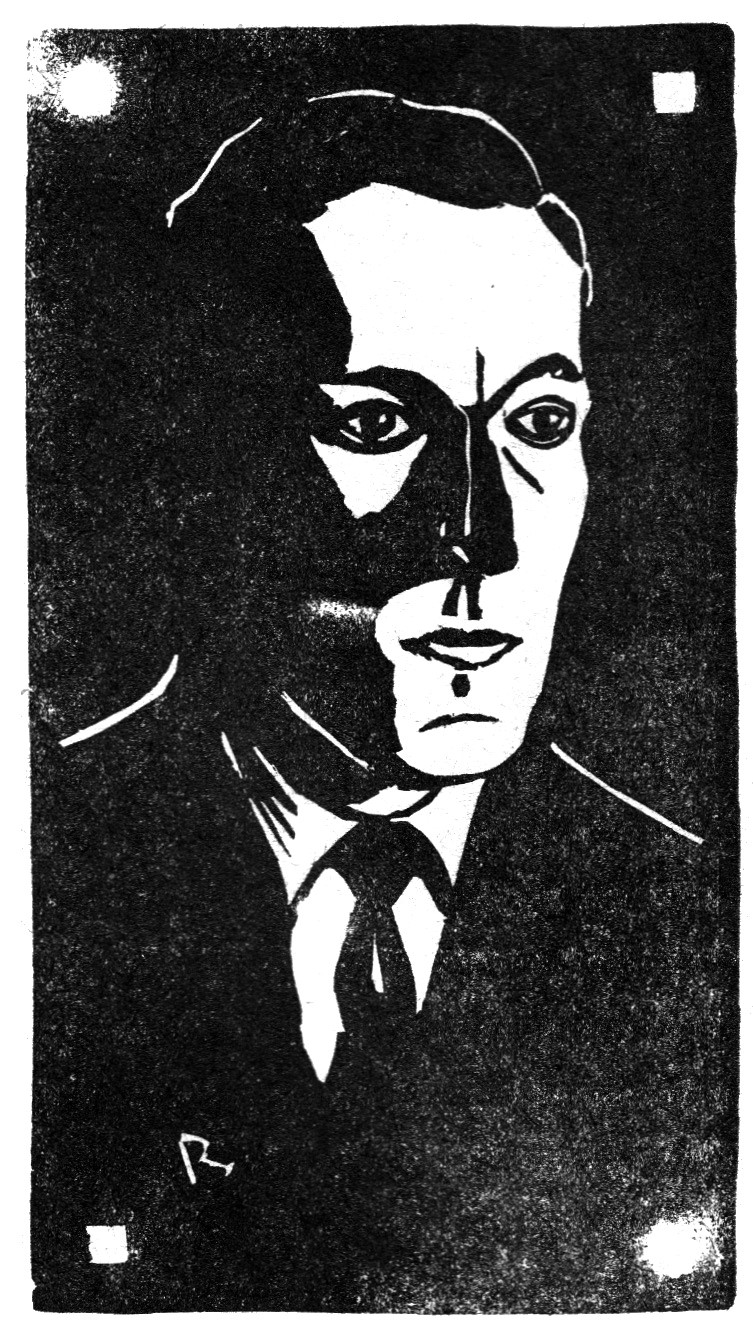
A linocut of H. P. Lovecraft by Duane W. Rimel

Howard was given the affectionate nickname "Two-Gun Bob" by virtue of his long explications to Lovecraft about the history of his beloved Southwest, and during the ensuing years he contributed several notable elements to Lovecraft's Cthulhu Mythos of horror stories, beginning with "The Black Stone". His Mythos stories also included "The Cairn on the Headland", "The Children of the Night" and "The Fire of Asshurbanipal". He also corresponded with other "Weird Tale" writers such as Clark Ashton Smith, August Derleth, and E. Hoffmann Price.

The correspondence between Howard and Lovecraft contained a lengthy discussion on a frequent element in Howard's fiction: barbarism versus civilization. Howard held that civilization was inherently corrupt and fragile. This attitude is summed up in his famous line from "Beyond the Black River": "Barbarism is the natural state of mankind. Civilization is unnatural. It is a whim of circumstance. And barbarism must always ultimately triumph." Lovecraft held the opposite viewpoint, that civilization was the peak of human achievement and the only way forward. Howard countered by listing many historic abuses of the citizenry by so-called 'civilized' leaders. Howard initially deferred to Lovecraft but gradually asserted his own views, even coming to deride Lovecraft's opinions.

In 1930, with his interest in Solomon Kane dwindling and his Kull stories not catching on, Howard applied his new sword-and-sorcery and horror experience to one of his first loves: the Picts. His story "Kings of the Night" depicted King Kull conjured into pre-Christian Britain to aid the Picts in their struggle against the invading Romans, and introduced readers to Howard's king of the Picts: Bran Mak Morn. Howard followed up this tale with the now-classic revenge nightmare "Worms of the Earth" and several other tales, creating horrific adventures tinged with a Cthulhu-esque gloss and notable for their use of metaphor and symbolism.

With the onset of the Great Depression, many pulp markets reduced their schedules or went out of business entirely. Howard saw market after market falter and vanish. Weird Tales became a bimonthly publication and pulps such as Fight Stories, Action Stories, and Strange Tales all folded. Howard was further hit when his savings were wiped out in 1931 when the Farmer's National Bank failed, and again, after transferring to another bank, when that one failed as well.

=== Conan ===
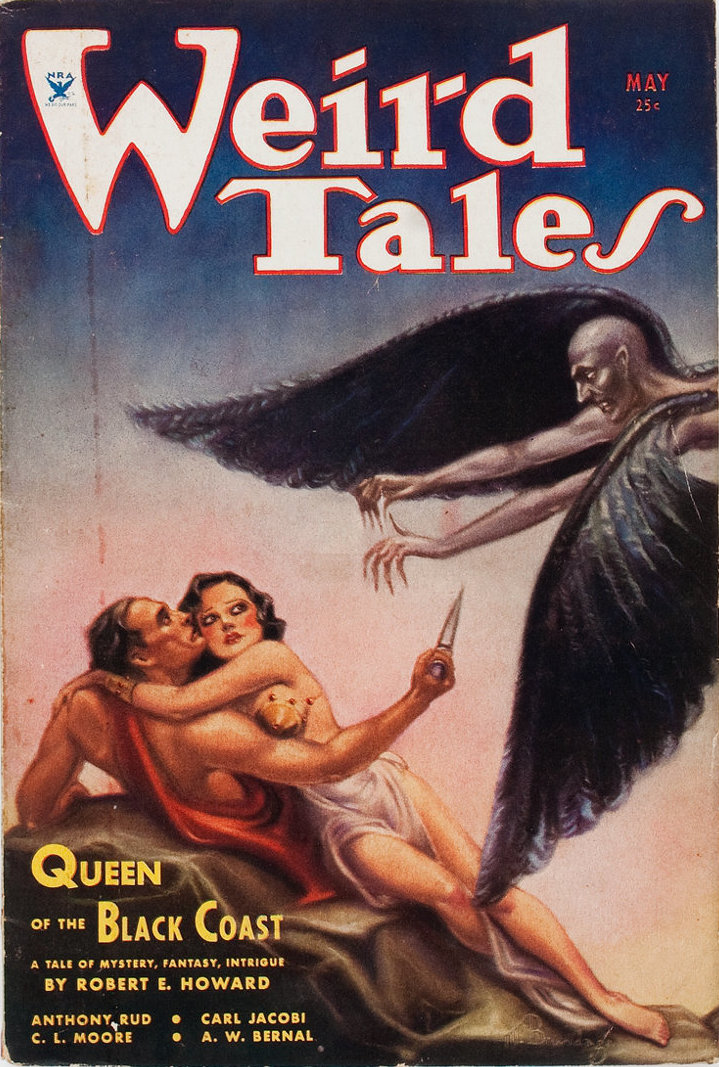
Weird Tales (May 1934) featuring "Queen of the Black Coast". This was the first of only three covers featuring Conan, although nine Conan stories featured on the cover in total

Early 1932 saw Howard taking one of his frequent trips around Texas. He traveled through the southern part of the state with his main occupation being, in his own words, "the wholesale consumption of tortillas, enchiladas and cheap Spanish wine." In Fredericksburg, while overlooking sullen hills through a misty rain, he conceived of the fantasy land of Cimmeria: a bitter, hard, northern region home to fearsome barbarians. In February, while in Mission, he wrote the poem Cimmeria.

It was also during this trip that Howard first conceived of the character of Conan. Later, in 1935, Howard claimed in a letter to Clark Ashton Smith that Conan "simply grew up in my mind a few years ago when I was stopping in a little border town on the lower Rio Grande." However, the character actually took nine months to develop.

Howard had originally used the name "Conan" for a Gael reaver in a past-life-themed story he completed in October 1931, which was published in the magazine Strange Tales in June 1932. Although the character swears by the god "Crom", that is his only link to the more famous successor character.

Going back home he developed the idea, fleshing out a new invented world—his Hyborian Age—and populating it with all manner of countries, peoples, monsters, and magic. Howard loved history and enjoyed writing historical stories. However, the research necessary for a purely historical setting was too time-consuming for him to engage in on a regular basis and still earn a living. The Hyborian Age, with its varied settings similar to real places and eras of history, allowed him to write fantastical historical fiction without such problems. He may have been inspired in the creation of his setting by Thomas Bulfinch's 1913 edition of his Bulfinch's Mythology called The Outline of Mythology, which contained stories from history and legend, including many that were direct influences on Howard's work. Another potential inspiration is G. K. Chesterton's The Ballad of the White Horse and Chesterton's concept that "it is the chief value of legend to mix up the centuries while preserving the sentiment."

By March, Howard had recycled an unpublished Kull story called "By This Axe I Rule!" into his first Conan story. The central plot remains that of a barbarian having become king of a civilized country and a conspiracy to assassinate him. However, he removed an entire subplot concerning a couple's romance and created a new one with a supernatural element; the story was re-titled "The Phoenix on the Sword", an element from this new subplot. Howard immediately went on to write two more Conan stories. The first of these was "The Frost-Giant's Daughter", an inversion of the Greek myth surrounding Apollo and Daphne, set much earlier in Conan's life. The last of the initial trio was "The God in the Bowl", which went through three drafts and has a slower pace than most Conan stories. This one is a murder mystery filled with corrupt officials and serves as Conan's introduction into civilization, while showing that he is a more decent person than the civilized characters. Before the end of the month, he sent the first two stories to Weird Tales in the same package, with the third following a few days later.

With these three completed he created an essay called "The Hyborian Age" in order to flesh out his setting in more detail. There were four drafts of this essay, starting with a two-page outline and finishing as an 8,000-word essay. Howard supplemented this with two sketched maps and an additional short piece entitled "Notes on Various Peoples of the Hyborian Age."

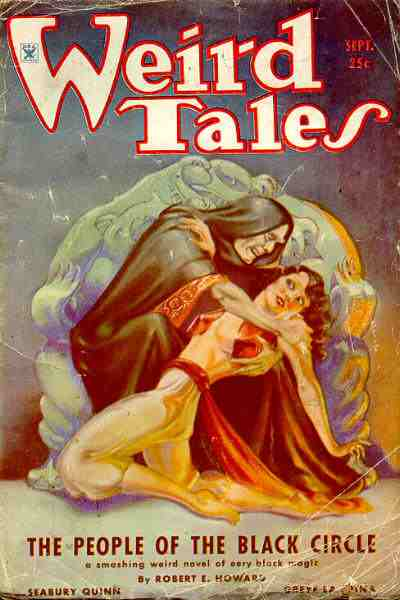
Weird Tales (September 1934) featuring "The People of the Black Circle", the first of the late period Conan stories

In a letter dated March 10, 1932, Farnsworth Wright rejected "The Frost-Giant's Daughter" but noted that "The Phoenix on the Sword" had "points of real excellence" and suggested changes. "The God in the Bowl" would also be rejected and so a potential fourth Conan story concerning Conan as a thief was abandoned at the synopsis stage. Instead of abandoning the entire Conan concept, as had happened with previous failed characters, Howard rewrote "The Phoenix on the Sword" based on Wright's feedback and including material from his essay. Both this revision and the next Conan story, "The Tower of the Elephant", sold with no problems. Howard had written nine Conan stories before the first saw print.

Conan first appeared to the public in Weird Tales in December 1932 and was such a hit that Howard was eventually able to place seventeen Conan stories in the magazine between 1933 and 1936. Howard then took a short break from Conan after his initial burst of stories, returning to the character in mid-1933. These stories, his "middle period", are routine and considered the weakest of the series. Stories, such as "Iron Shadows in the Moon", were often simply Conan rescuing a damsel in distress from a monster in some ruins. While earlier Conan stories had three or four drafts, some in this period had only two including the final version. "Rogues in the House" is the only Conan story to be completed in a single draft. These stories sold easily and they include the first and second Conan stories to feature on the cover of Weird Tales, "Black Colossus" and "Xuthal of the Dusk". Howard's motivation for quick and easy sales at this time was influenced by the collapse of some other markets, such as Fight Stories, in the Depression.

Also in this period, Howard wrote the first of the James Allison stories, "Marchers of Valhalla". Allison is a disabled Texan who begins to recall his past lives, the first of which is in the later part of Howard's new Hyborian age. In a letter to Clark Ashton Smith in October 1933, he wrote that its sequel "The Garden of Fear" was "dealing with one of my various conceptions of the Hyborian and post-Hyborian world."

In May 1933, a British publisher, Denis Archer, contacted Howard about publishing a book in the United Kingdom. Howard submitted a batch of his best available stories, including "The Tower of the Elephant" and "The Scarlet Citadel", on June 15. In January 1934, the publisher rejected the collection but suggested a novel instead. Though the publisher was "exceedingly interested" in the stories, the rejection letter explained that there was a "prejudice that is very strong over here just now against collections of short stories." The suggested novel, however, could be published by Pawling and Ness Ltd in a first edition of 5,000 copies for lending libraries.

In late 1933, Howard returned to Conan, starting again slightly awkwardly with "The Devil in Iron". However, this was followed with the beginning of the latter group of Conan stories that "carry the most intellectual punch," starting with "The People of the Black Circle".

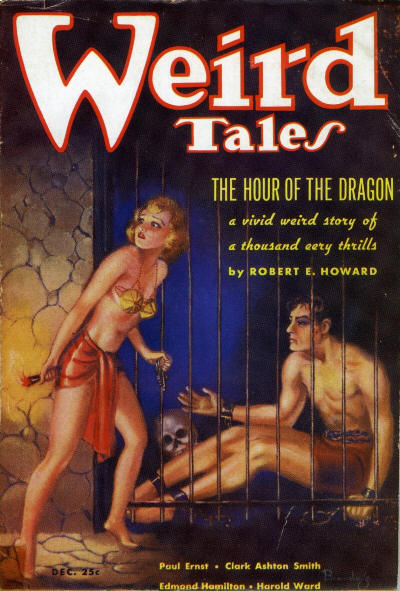
Weird Tales (December 1935) featuring the first installment of the novel The Hour of the Dragon

Howard probably began to work on the novel in February 1934, starting to write Almuric (a non-Conan, sword and planet science fiction novel) but abandoned it half way. This was followed by another abortive attempt at a novel, this time a Conan novel that later became Drums of Tombalku. The third attempt at writing the novel was more successful, resulting in Howard's only Conan novel The Hour of the Dragon, which was probably started on or around March 17, 1934. This novel combines elements of two previous Conan stories, "Black Colossus" and "The Scarlet Citadel", with Arthurian myth and provides an overview of Conan and the Hyborian age for the new British audience. Howard sent his final draft to Denis Archer on May 20, 1934. He had worked exclusively on the novel for two months, writing approximately 5,000 words per day, seven days a week. Although he told acquaintances that he had little hope for this novel, he had put a lot of effort into it. However, the publisher went into receivership in late 1934, before it could print the novel. The story was briefly held as part of the company's assets before being returned to Howard. It was later printed in Weird Tales as a serial over five months, beginning with the December 1935 issue.

Howard may have begun losing interest in Conan in late 1934, with a growing desire to write westerns. He began to write, although never finished, a Conan story called "Wolves Beyond the Border". This was the first Conan tale to have an explicit (Robert W. Chambers-influenced) American setting, although American themes had appeared earlier, and the only one in which Conan himself does not appear. His next story was based on his unfinished material and became "Beyond the Black River", which not only used the different American-frontier setting but was also, in Howard's own words, a "Conan yarn without sex interest." In another novel twist, Conan and the other protagonists have, at best, a pyrrhic victory; this was rare for pulp magazines. This was followed by another experimental Conan story, "The Black Stranger", with a similar setting. The story was, however, rejected by Weird Tales, which was rare for later Conan stories. Howard's next piece, "The Man-Eaters of Zamboula", was more formulaic and was accepted by the magazine with no problems. Howard only wrote one more Conan story, "Red Nails", which was influenced both by his personal experiences at the time and an extrapolation of his views on civilization.

The character of Conan had a wide and enduring influence among other Weird Tales writers, including C. L. Moore and Fritz Leiber, and over the ensuing decades the genre of sword and sorcery grew up around Howard's masterwork, with dozens of practitioners evoking Howard's creation to one degree or another.

=== New markets ===
In spring 1933, Howard started to place work with Otis Adelbert Kline, a former pulp writer, as his agent. Kline encouraged him to try writing in other genres in order to expand into different markets. Kline's agency was successful in finding outlets for more of Howard's stories and even placed works that had been rejected when Howard was marketing himself alone. Howard continued to sell directly to Weird Tales, however.

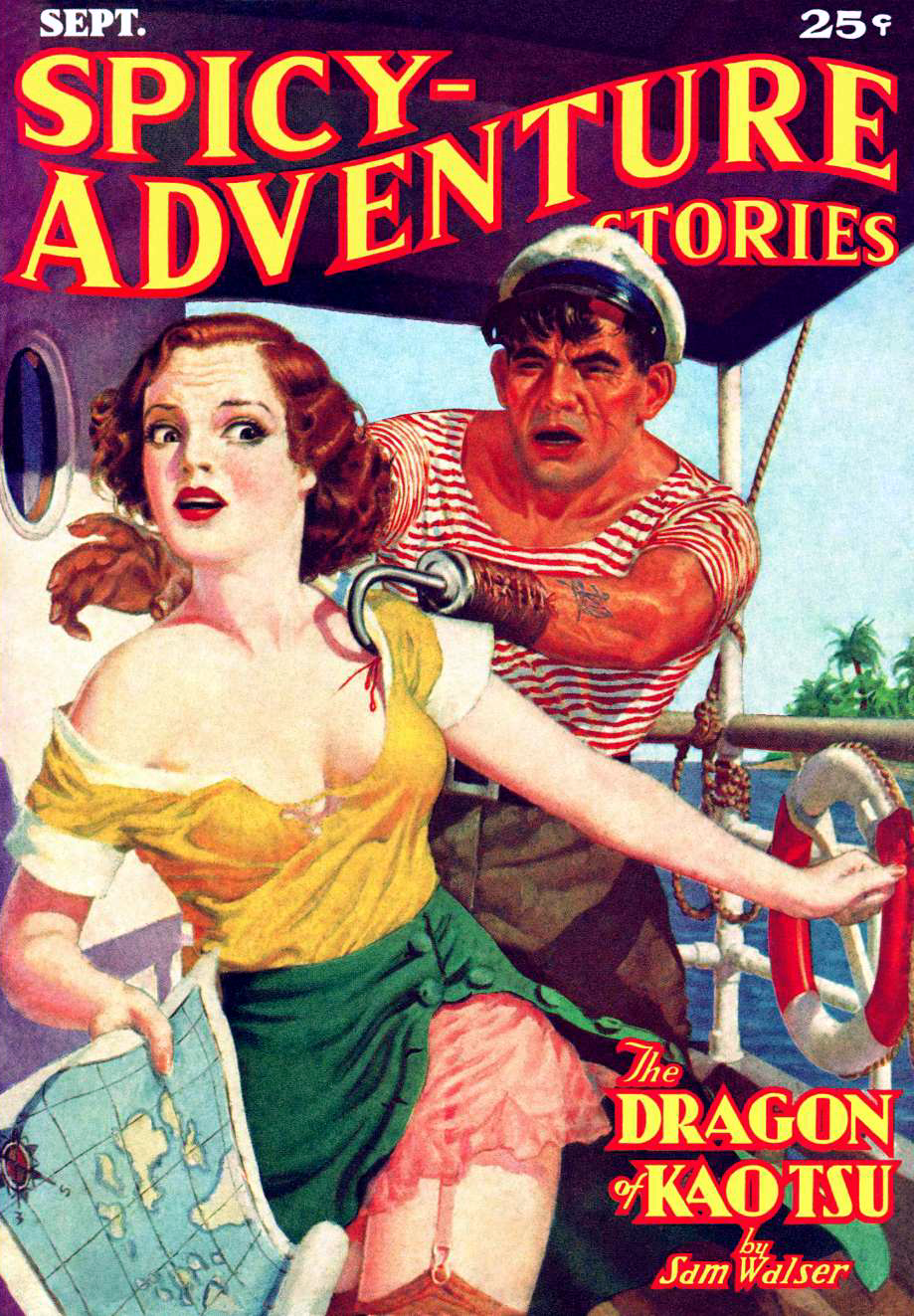
Spicy-Adventure Stories (September 1936) featuring "The Dragon of Kao Tsu" by Sam Walser (a.k.a. Robert E. Howard)

Howard wrote one of the first "Weird Western" stories ever created, "The Horror from the Mound", published in the May 1932 issue of Weird Tales. This genre acted as a bridge between his early "weird" stories (a contemporary term for horror and fantasy) and his later straight western tales.

He tried writing detective fiction but hated reading mystery stories and disliked writing them; he was not successful in this genre. More successfully, in late 1933 Howard took a character conceived in his youth, El Borak, and began using him in mature, professional tales of World War I-era Middle Eastern adventure that landed in Top Notch, Complete Stories, and Thrilling Adventures. The 1920s version was a treasure-hunting adventurer but the 1930s version, first seen in "The Daughter of Erlik Khan" in the December 1934 issue of Top-Notch, was a grim gun-fighter keeping the peace after having gone native in Afghanistan. The stories have a lot in common with those of Talbot Mundy, Harold Lamb and T. E. Lawrence, with Western themes and Howard's hardboiled style of writing. As with his other series, he created another character in the same vein, Kirby O'Donnell, but this character lacked the grim, western elements and was not as successful.

In the years since Conan had been created, Howard found himself increasingly fascinated with the history and lore of Texas and the American Southwest. Many of his letters to H. P. Lovecraft ran for a dozen pages or more, filled with stories he had picked up from elderly Civil War veterans, Texas Rangers, and pioneers. His Conan stories began featuring western elements, most notably in "Beyond the Black River", "The Black Stranger", and the unfinished "Wolves Beyond the Border". By 1934 some of the markets killed off by the Depression had come back, and Weird Tales was over $1500 behind on payments to Howard. The author therefore stopped writing weird fiction and turned his attentions to this steadily growing passion.

The first of Howard's most commercially successful series (within his own lifetime) was started in July 1933. "Mountain Man" was the first of the Breckinridge Elkins stories, humorous westerns in a similar style to his earlier Sailor Steve Costigan stories and again featuring an exaggerated, cartoonish version of Howard himself as the main character. Written as tall tales in the vein of Texas "Tall Lying" stories, the story first appeared in the March–April 1934 issue of Action Stories and was so successful that other magazines asked Howard for similar characters. Howard created Pike Bearfield for Argosy and Buckner J. Grimes for Cowboy Stories. Action Stories published a new Elkins story every issue without fail until well after Howard's death. At Kline's suggestion, he also created A Gent from Bear Creek, a Breckinridge Elkins novel comprising existing short stories and new material.

Conan remained the only character that Howard ever spoke of with his friends in Texas and the only one in whom they seemed interested. It is possible that Breckinridge Elkins and the other characters in his stories were too close to home for Howard to be entirely comfortable discussing them.

In the spring of 1936, Howard sold a series of "spicy" stories to Spicy-Adventure Stories. The "spicy" series of pulp magazines dealt in stories that were considered borderline softcore pornography at the time but are now similar to romance novels. These stories, which Howard referred to as "bubby-twisters", featured the character Wild Bill Clanton and were published under the pseudonym Sam Walser.

=== Novalyne Price ===
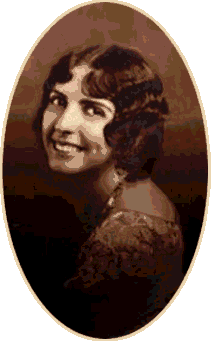
Novalyne Price

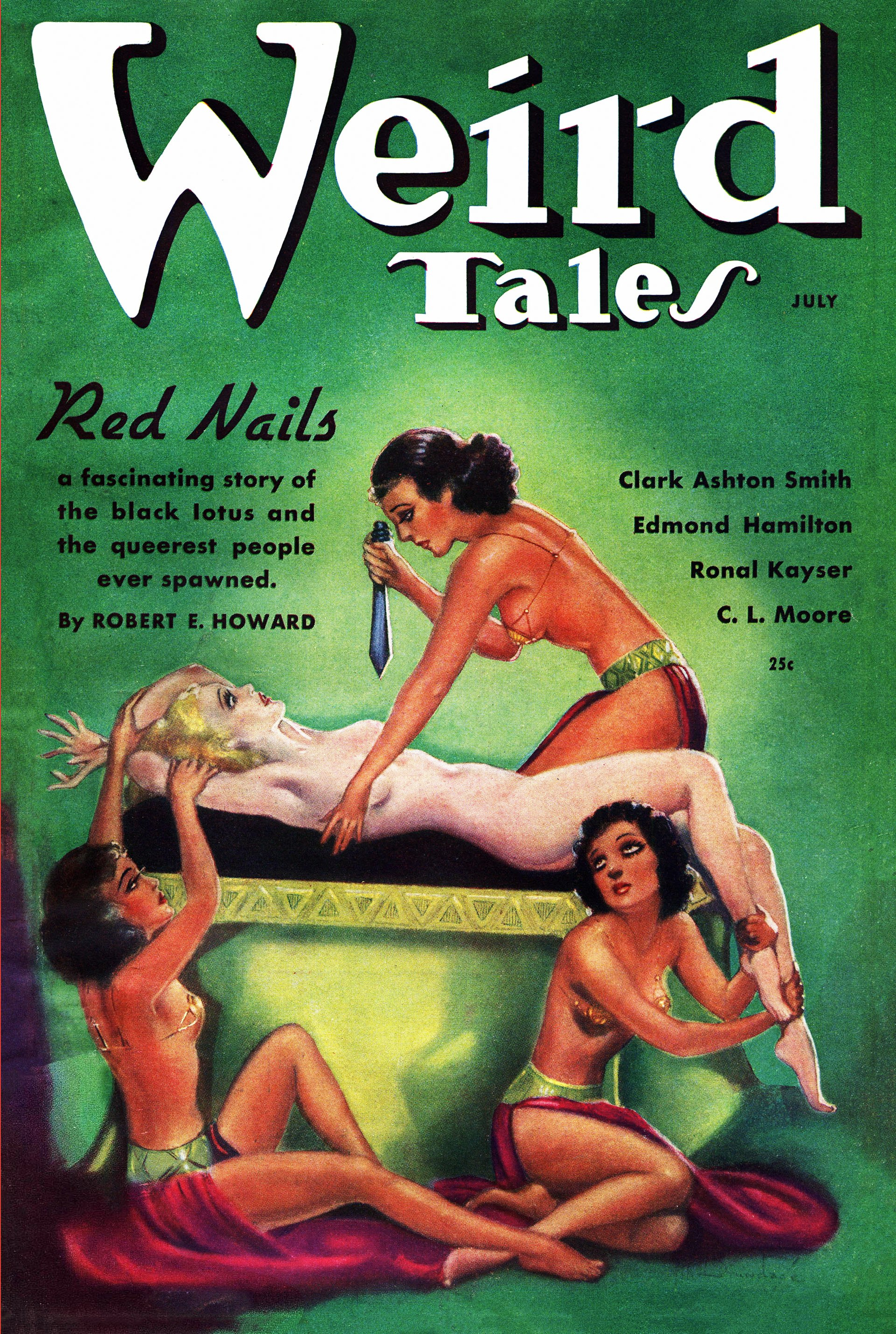
Weird Tales (July 1936) featuring "Red Nails".

"Red Nails" was inspired by a trip to New Mexico with Truett Vinson, during which Howard discovered that Vinson was also in a relationship with Price.

Howard is known to have had only one girlfriend in his life, Novalyne Price. Price was an ex-girlfriend of Tevis Clyde Smith, one of Howard's best friends, whom she had known since high school; Smith and Price had remained friends after their relationship ended. In the spring of 1933, Howard was visiting Smith after driving his mother to a Brownwood clinic. Howard and Smith drove to the Price farm and Smith introduced his friends to each other. Price was an aspiring writer, had heard of Howard from Smith in the past, and was enthusiastic to meet him in person. However, he was not what she expected. She wrote in her diary about this first meeting: "This man was a writer! Him? It was unbelievable. He was not dressed as I thought a writer should dress." They parted after a drive and would not see each other again for over a year.

In late 1934, Price got a job as a schoolteacher in Cross Plains High School through her cousin, who was the head of the English department. When Howard came up in conversation with her new colleagues, she defended him from accusations of being a "freak" and "crazy", then phoned his house and left a message. When the call was not returned, she tried a few more times. Price finally visited the Howard house in person after having her telephone calls blocked by Hester Howard. After a drive through town, Howard and Price arranged their first date.

Over much of the next two years, they dated on and off, spending much time discussing writing, philosophy, history, religion, reincarnation, and much else. Both considered marriage but never at the same time. Price became ill from overwork in mid-1935. Her doctor, a friend of Howard's father, advised her to end the relationship and get a job in a different state. Despite agreeing to this, she met with Howard soon after being discharged. Howard, however, was too preoccupied with the state of his mother's health to give her the attention she wanted. Their relationship did not last much longer.

Not considering herself to be in an exclusive relationship, Price began dating one of Howard's best friends, Truett Vinson. Howard discovered his friends' relationship while he and Truett were on a week's trip together to New Mexico (the same trip that inspired a lot of the final Conan story "Red Nails"). The relationship between Howard and Price was irrevocably scarred, but they continued visiting with each other as friends until May 1936, when Price left Cross Plains to pursue a graduate degree at Louisiana State University. The two never spoke or wrote to each other again.

In an effort to improve her memory and writing, Price had begun recording all her daily conversations into a journal, in the process preserving an intimate record of her time with Howard. This was useful years later when she wrote of their relationship in her book One Who Walked Alone. This book became the basis for the 1996 film The Whole Wide World starring Vincent D'Onofrio as Howard and Renée Zellweger as Price.

=== Death ===
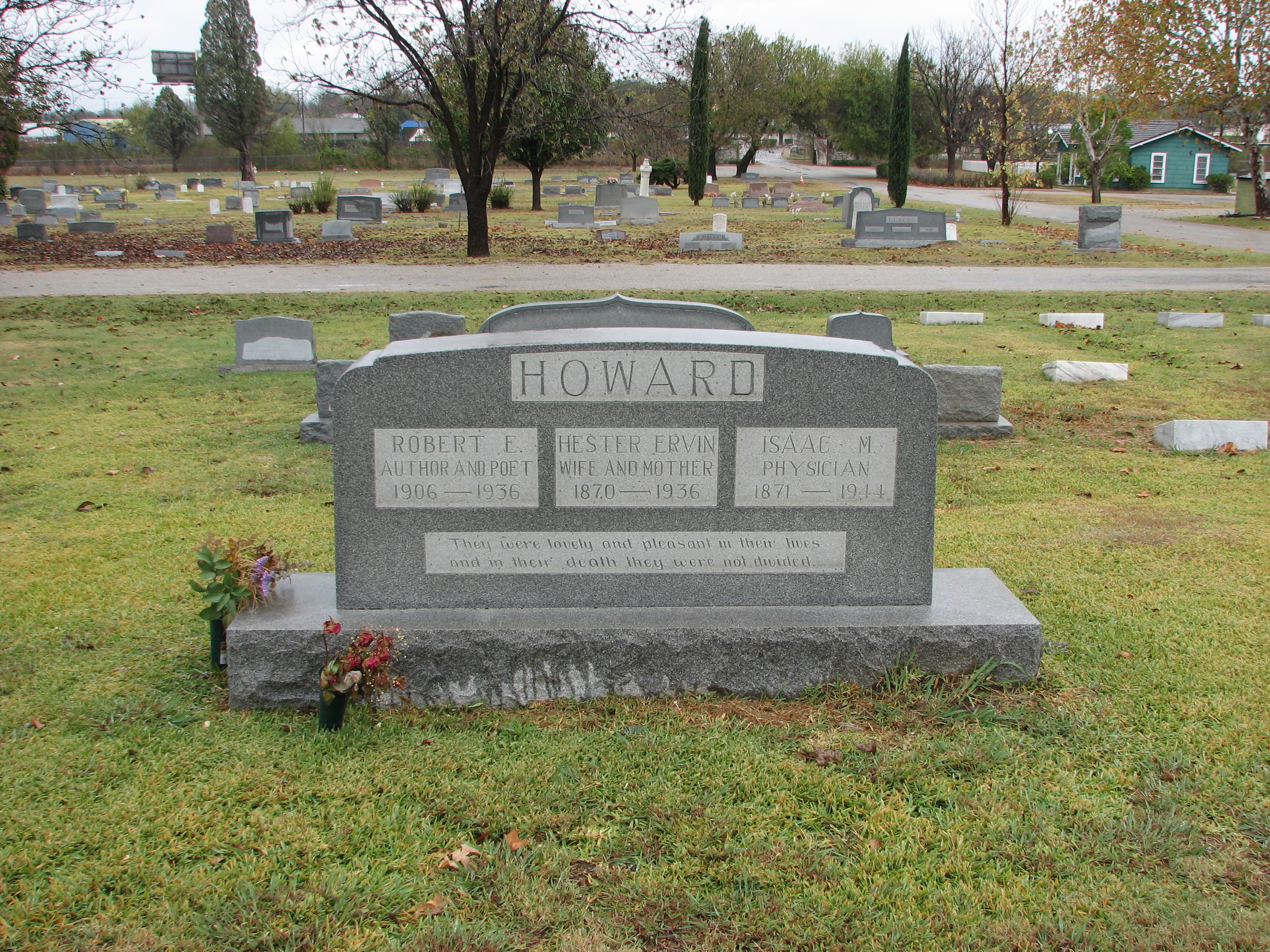
Howard family gravestone in Brownwood, Texas

By 1936, almost all of Howard's fiction writing was being devoted to westerns. The novel A Gent from Bear Creek was due to be published by Herbert Jenkins in England, and by all accounts it looked as if he was finally breaking out of the pulps and into the more prestigious book market. However, life was becoming especially difficult for Howard. All of his close friends had married and were immersed in their careers, Novalyne Price had left Cross Plains for graduate school, and his most reliable market, Weird Tales, had grown far behind on its payments. His home life was also falling apart. Having suffered from tuberculosis for decades, his mother was finally nearing death. The constant interruptions of care workers at home, combined with frequent trips to various sanatoriums for her care, made it nearly impossible for Howard to write.

In hindsight, there were hints about Howard's plans. Several times in 1935–36, whenever his mother's health had declined, he made veiled allusions to his father about planning suicide, which his father did not understand at the time. He had made references when speaking to Novalyne Price about being in his "sere and yellow leaf". The words sounded familiar to her, but it was only in early June 1936 that she found the source in Macbeth:

I have liv'd long enough: my way of life
Is fall'n into the sere, the yellow leaf;
And that which should accompany old age,
As honour, love, obedience, troops of friends,
I must not look to have; but, in their stead,
Curses, not loud but deep, mouth-honour, breath,
Which the poor heart would fain deny, and dare not.

— William Shakespeare, Macbeth, Act V, Scene III

In the weeks before his suicide, Howard wrote to Kline giving his agent instructions of what to do in case of his death. He wrote his last will and testament, and he borrowed a .380 Colt Automatic from his friend Lindsey Tyson. On June 10, he drove to Brownwood and bought a burial plot for the whole family. On the night before his suicide, when his father confirmed that his mother was finally dying, he asked where his father would go afterwards. Isaac Howard replied that he would go wherever his son went, thinking he meant to leave Cross Plains. It is possible that Howard thought his father would join him in ending their lives together as a family.

"All fled, all done, so lift me on the pyre;
The feast is over and the lamps expire."

— Howard's suicide note, found in his typewriter after the event or found in his wallet, as different sources state. The lines were taken from the poem "The House of Cæsar" by Viola Garvin.

In June 1936, as Hester Howard slipped into her final coma, her son maintained a death vigil with his father and friends of the family, getting little sleep, drinking huge amounts of coffee, and growing more despondent. On the morning of June 11, 1936, Howard asked one of his mother's nurses, a Mrs. Green, if his mother would ever regain consciousness. When she told him no, he walked out to his car in the driveway, took the pistol from the glove box, and shot himself in the head. He died eight hours later, and his mother died the following day. The story occupied the entirety of that week's edition of the Cross Plains Review, along with the publication of Howard's "A Man-Eating Jeopard". On June 14, 1936, a double funeral service was held at Cross Plains First Baptist Church, and both were buried in Greenleaf Cemetery in Brownwood, Texas.

== Health ==
Robert E. Howard's health, especially his mental health, has been the focus of the biographical and critical analysis of his life. In terms of physical health, Howard had a weak heart, which he treated by taking Digoxin. The precise nature of Howard's mental health has been much debated, both during his life and following his suicide. Three main points of view exist: some have declared that Howard suffered from an Oedipal complex or similar; another viewpoint is that Howard suffered from major depressive disorder; the third view is that Howard had no disorders and his suicide was a common reaction to stress.

== Character sketch ==
=== Attitudes ===
Howard's attitude towards race and racism is debated. Howard used race as shorthand for physical characteristics and motivation. He would also employ some racial stereotypes, possibly for the sake of simplification. He was also of the belief that, no matter who won the subsequent conflicts, it would only ever be a temporary victory. In "Wings in the Night", for instance, Howard writes that:

The ancient empires fall, the dark-skinned peoples fade and even the demons of antiquity gasp their last, but over all stands the Aryan barbarian, white-skinned, cold-eyed, dominant, the supreme fighting man of the earth.

Howard became less racist as he grew older, due to several influences. Later works include more sympathetic black characters, as well as other minority groups, such as Jews. Significant works in terms of Howard's views on race are "Black Canaan" and "The Last White Man", which depict white protagonists at war with black characters defined by barbarity.

Howard had feminist views, despite his era and location, which he espoused in both personal and professional life. Howard wrote to his friends and associates defending the achievements and capabilities of women. Strong female characters in Howard's works of fiction include the protofeminist Dark Agnes de Chastillon (first appearing in "Sword Woman", circa 1932–1934); the early modern pirate Helen Tavrel ("The Isle of Pirates' Doom", 1928), two pirates and Conan supporting characters, Bêlit ("Queen of the Black Coast", 1934) and Valeria of the Red Brotherhood ("Red Nails", 1936); as well as the Ukrainian mercenary Red Sonya of Rogatino ("The Shadow of the Vulture", 1934).

=== Physical ===
Physically, Howard was tall and heavily built. He had a gentle, round face with a soft, deep voice. E. Hoffmann Price wrote that when he first met Howard in 1934 he "was busy trying to combine two images, that of the actual man, and that of the man who loomed up in those stirring yarns. The synthesis was never effected. He was packed with the whimsy and poetry which rang out in his letters, and blazed up in much of his published fiction, but, as is usually the case with writers, his appearance belied him. His face was boyish, not yet having squared off into angles; his blue eyes slightly prominent, had a wide-openness which did not suggest anything of the man's keen wit and agile fancy. That first picture persists—a powerful, solid, round-faced fellow, kindly and somewhat stolid seeming."

=== Leisure activities ===
Howard enjoyed listening to other people's stories. He listened to tales told by family members growing up and, as an adult, collected stories from any older people willing to tell them. Howard's parents were both natural storytellers of different kinds and he grew up in early 20th century Texas, an environment in which the telling of tall tales was a standard form of entertainment. He himself was a natural storyteller and later a professional storyteller. Combined, this often led to his embellishing facts in his communication, not with an intention to deceive but just to make a better story. This can be a problem for biographers reading his works and letters with an aim to understand Howard himself.

Howard had an almost photographic memory and could memorize long poems after only a few readings. He also enjoyed listening to music and drama on the radio. However his main interests were sports and politics, and he would listen to match reports and election results as they came in.

After Howard bought a car in 1932, he and his friends took regular excursions across Texas and nearby states. His letters to Lovecraft also contain information about the history and geography he encountered on his journeys. He was also a practitioner and fan of boxing, and an avid weightlifter.

== Writing ==
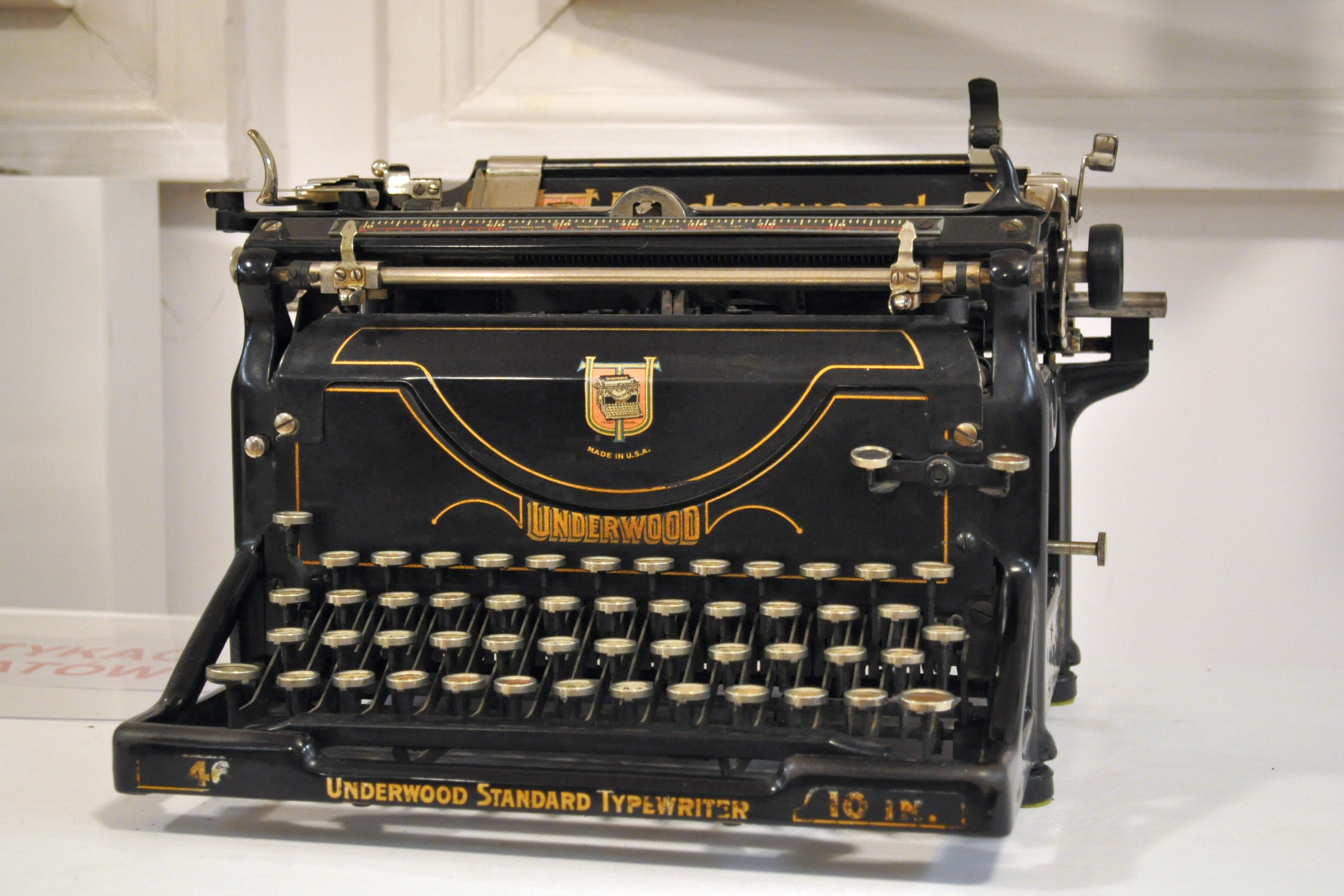
An Underwood typewriter, such as Howard used to write his poetry and fiction

Howard's first published poem was "The Sea", in an early 1923 issue of local newspaper The Baylor United Statement. His first published story was "Spear and Fang", sold in late November 1924 and published in the July 1925 issue of the pulp magazine Weird Tales. However, Howard's first real success was the Sailor Steve Costigan series of humorous boxing stories, beginning with "The Pit of the Serpent" published in the July 1929 issue of the pulp magazine Fight Stories.

=== Styles and themes ===
Howard's distinctive literary style relies on a combination of existentialism, poetic lyricism, violence, grimness, humor, burlesque, and a degree of hardboiled realism. Howard's background in Texan tall tales is the source of the rhythm, drive and authenticity of his work. Howard used an economy of words to sketch out scenes in his stories; his ability to do so has been attributed to his skill with, and experience of, both tall tales and poetry. The tone of Howard's works, especially in the Conan stories, is hardboiled and dark. This is contrasted with the fantastic elements contained within the stories. Direct experience of the oil booms in early 20th century Texas influenced Howard's view of civilization. The benefits of progress came with lawlessness and corruption. One of the most common themes in Howard's writing is based on his view of history, a repeating pattern of civilizations reaching their peak, becoming decadent, decaying and then being conquered by another people. Many of his works are set in the period of decay or among the ruins the dead civilization leaves behind.

=== Influence and influences ===
I have carefully gone over, in my mind, the most powerful men—that is, in my opinion—in all of the world's literature and here is my list: Jack London, Leonid Andreyev, Omar Khayyam, Eugene O'Neill, William Shakespeare. All these men, and especially London and Khayyam, to my mind stand out so far above the rest of the world that comparison is futile, a waste of time. Reading these men and appreciating them makes a man feel life is not altogether useless.

— Robert E. Howard, letter to Tevis Clyde Smith, February 20, 1928

The oil boom in Texas was "one of the most powerful influences on [Howard's] life and art", albeit one that he hated. Howard grew to despise the oil industry along with everyone and everything associated with it. The oil boom heavily influenced Howard's view of civilization as a constant cycle of boom and bust in the same manner as the oil industry in contemporary Texas. A town such as Cross Plains was built by pioneers. The boom brought civilization in the form of people and investment but also social breakdown. The oil people contributed little or nothing to the town in the long term and eventually left for the next oil field. This led Howard to see civilization as corrupting and society as a whole in decay.

Howard first bought a pulp magazine, a copy of Adventure, when he was fifteen. The stories and writers featured in this magazine were a strong influence on him. In the same year, he sent his first story, "Bill Smalley and the Power of the Human Eye", to the magazine, although it was rejected. Despite repeated attempts during his life, Howard never sold a story to Adventure.

Howard was both influenced by and an influence on his friend H. P. Lovecraft. Many ideas that he discussed in his letters to Lovecraft were repeated in his fiction and the discussion with a fellow professional writer was useful to him. For his part, Lovecraft began to include Howardian action sequences in his own work, for example in The Shadow over Innsmouth. Much of 1931 was spent by Howard attempting to mimic Lovecraft's style. After that year, he had absorbed the parts of it that worked best for him and made them his own.

Another inspiration for Howard was Theosophy and the theories of Helena Blavatsky and William Scott-Elliot, who described lost civilizations, ancient wisdom, races, magic and sunken continents and the lands of Lemuria, Atlantis and Hyperborea, and also influenced other writers of weird fiction.

Howard influenced and inspired later writers including Samuel R. Delany, David Gemmell, Michael Moorcock, Matthew Woodring Stover, Charles R. Saunders, Karl Edward Wagner, Paul Kearney, Steven Erikson, Joe R. Lansdale, and William King. (Note: Tompkins (2005, p. 38): "True, the era during which drugstore racks were a Muscle Beach of Kandars, Kothars, Thongors, Wandors, Odans, and Orons is long gone, but is S&S in trouble?" Tompkins then presents a series of quotes from modern fantasy writers who claim a strong Howardian influence.) He also has an influence on the field of fantasy fiction rivaled only by J. R. R. Tolkien and Tolkien's similarly inspired creation of the modern genre of high fantasy. (Note: Clute & Grant (1999, pp. 39 & 483): "The combined success of Howard's Conan books and J.R.R. Tolkien's LotR in paperback had resulted in unprecedented interest in heroic and high fantasy."; "[Howard] remains of central interest in the field of fantasy for his sword and sorcery; the templates he established for that mode have remained influential for most of the 20th century.")

=== Criticism ===
Although he had his faults as a writer, Howard was a natural storyteller, whose narratives are unmatched for vivid, gripping, headlong action ... In fiction, the difference between a writer who is a natural storyteller and one who is not is like the difference between a boat that will float and one that will not. If the writer has this quality, we can forgive many other faults; if not, no other virtue can make up for the lack, any more than gleaming paint and sparkling brass on a boat make up for the fact that it will not float.

— L. Sprague de Camp, Conan of the Isles, "Introduction", 1968

Criticism of Robert E. Howard and his work often turns towards biographical details and "backhanded compliment[s]." Some imply that Howard was an uneducated idiot savant and that his success was due more to luck than skill.

The first professional critic to comment on Howard's work was Hoffman Reynolds Hays, reviewing the Arkham House collection Skull-Face and Others in The New York Times Book Review. Under the title "Superman on a Psychotic Bender", Hays wrote, "Howard used a good deal of the Lovecraft cosmogony and demonology, but his own contribution was a sadistic conqueror who, when cracking heads did not solve his difficulties, had recourse to magic and the aid of Lovecraft's Elder Gods. The stories are written on a competent pulp level (a higher level, by the way, than that of some best sellers) and are allied to the Superman genre which pours forth in countless comic books and radio serials." Hays then moved on to Howard himself and the genre in which he wrote:

A sensitive boy, he was apparently bullied by his schoolmates. ... Howard's heroes were consequently wish-projections of himself. All of the frustrations of his own life were conquered in a dream world of magic and heroic carnage. In exactly the same way Superman compensates for all the bewilderment and frustration in which the semi-literate product of the Industrial age finds himself enmeshed. The problem of evil is solved by an impossibly omnipotent hero. ... Thus the hero-literature of the pulps and the comics is symptomatic of a profound contradiction. On the one hand it is testimony to insecurity and apprehension, and on the other it is a degraded echo of the epic. But the ancient hero story was a glorification of significant elements in the culture that produced it. Mr. Howard's heroes project the immature fantasy of a split mind and logically pave the way to schizophrenia.

In a review of Michel Houellebecq's essay "H. P. Lovecraft: Against the World, Against Life" published in the Los Angeles Times, April 17, 2005, Stephen King implies that Howard did not work at his craft and was merely pastiching Lovecraft. King described his disapproval of the sword and sorcery genre, and superheroes, in his book on writing Danse Macabre: "[It] is not fantasy at its lowest, but it still has a pretty tacky feel. ... Sword and sorcery novels and stories are tales of power for the powerless. The fellow who is afraid of being rousted by those young punks who hang around his bus stop can go home at night and imagine himself wielding a sword, his potbelly miraculously gone, his slack muscles magically transmuted into those "iron thews" which have been sung and storied in the pulps for the last fifty years." On Howard in particular, he wrote:

Howard overcame the limitations of his puerile material by the force and fury of his writing and by his imagination, which was powerful beyond his hero Conan's wildest dreams of power. In his best work, Howard's writing seems so highly charged with energy that it nearly gives off sparks. Stories such as "The People of the Black Circle" glow with the fierce and eldritch light of his frenzied intensity. At his best, Howard was the Thomas Wolfe of fantasy, and most of his Conan tales seem to almost fall over themselves in their need to get out. Yet his other work was either unremarkable or just abysmal.

An exception to this, in King's opinion (again from Danse Macabre), was the author's Southern Gothic horror story "Pigeons From Hell". King referred to this work as "one of the finest horror stories of our century."

In the foreword to "Two-Gun Bob", a collection of essays on the subject of Howard, fellow fantasy fiction writer, Michael Moorcock, wrote: "The ability to paint a complex scene with a few expert brushstrokes remains Howard's greatest talent, and such talent can't, of course, ever be taught." Howard scholar Rob Roehm considers the use of the phrase "can't ever be taught" to be a variation on the recurrent theme of Howard's lack of skill or training. Moorcock's foreword goes on "[Howard's] greatest hero, Conan the Barbarian, is his best, created from whole cloth, with a nod to Natty Bumppo and Tarzan of the Apes, and most closely representing the kind of person Howard, home-bound, mother-worshipping, suspicious of big cities, would in his dreams most like to be." Roehm counters that none of the assertions made about Howard in that comment are true, although none of them are unique to Moorcock either. In Wizardry & Wild Romance, Moorcock has also written both that Howard "brought a brash, tough element to the epic fantasy that did as much to change the course of the American school away from previous writing and static imagery as Hammett, Chandler and the Black Mask pulp writers were to change the course of the American detective fiction" and that he "was never a commercially successful writer in his lifetime. His brash, hasty, careless style did not lend itself to the classier pulps. Most of his work appeared in the cheapest of them."

=== Earnings ===
The following table shows Howard's earnings from writing throughout his career, with appropriate milestones and events noted by each year. During the Depression, Howard earned more than anyone else in Cross Plains. When Howard died, Weird Tales still owed him between $800 and $1,300. (Adjusted for inflation, this amount would be equivalent to between $18,561 and $30,162.)

Robert E. Howard's earnings from writing
Year	Earnings	Adjusted for inflation	Notes
1926	$50.00	$909	
1927	$37.50	$695	
1928	$186.00	$3,488	1st Solomon Kane published
1929	$772.50	$14,484	1st Kull, 1st Steve Costigan
1930	$1,303.50	$25,122	Oriental Stories launched, 1st Bran Mak Morn
1931	$1,500.26	$31,762	
1932	$1,067.50	$25,190	Fight Stories suspended, Kline engaged as agent, 1st Conan
1933	$962.25	$23,933	Oriental Stories becomes Magic Carpet
1934	$1,853.05	$44,598	Magic Carpet cancelled, Action Stories re-launched, 1st professional El Borak, 1st Kirby O'Donnell, 1st Breckenridge Elkins
1935	$2,000+	$46,966+	Records incomplete
1936	"By the spring of 1936, he was enjoying an all-time high in sales."		
Source: Lord (1976, pp. 75–79)

=== Letters ===
Three publishing houses have put out collections of Howard's letters. In 1989 and 1991, Necronomicon Press published Robert E. Howard: Selected Letters in two volumes (1923–1930 and 1931–1936) edited by Glenn Lord with Rusty Burke, S. T. Joshi, and Steve Behrends. In 2007 and 2008, The Robert E. Howard Foundation Press published a three volume set (1923–1929, 1930–1932, and 1933–1936) titled The Collected Letters of Robert E. Howard, edited by Rob Roehm. Additionally, in 2009, Hippocampus Press published two volumes (1930–1932 and 1933–1936) of Howard's correspondence with H. P. Lovecraft as A Means to Freedom: The Letters of H.P. Lovecraft & Robert E. Howard, edited by S. T. Joshi, David Schultz, and Rusty Burke.

== Legacy ==
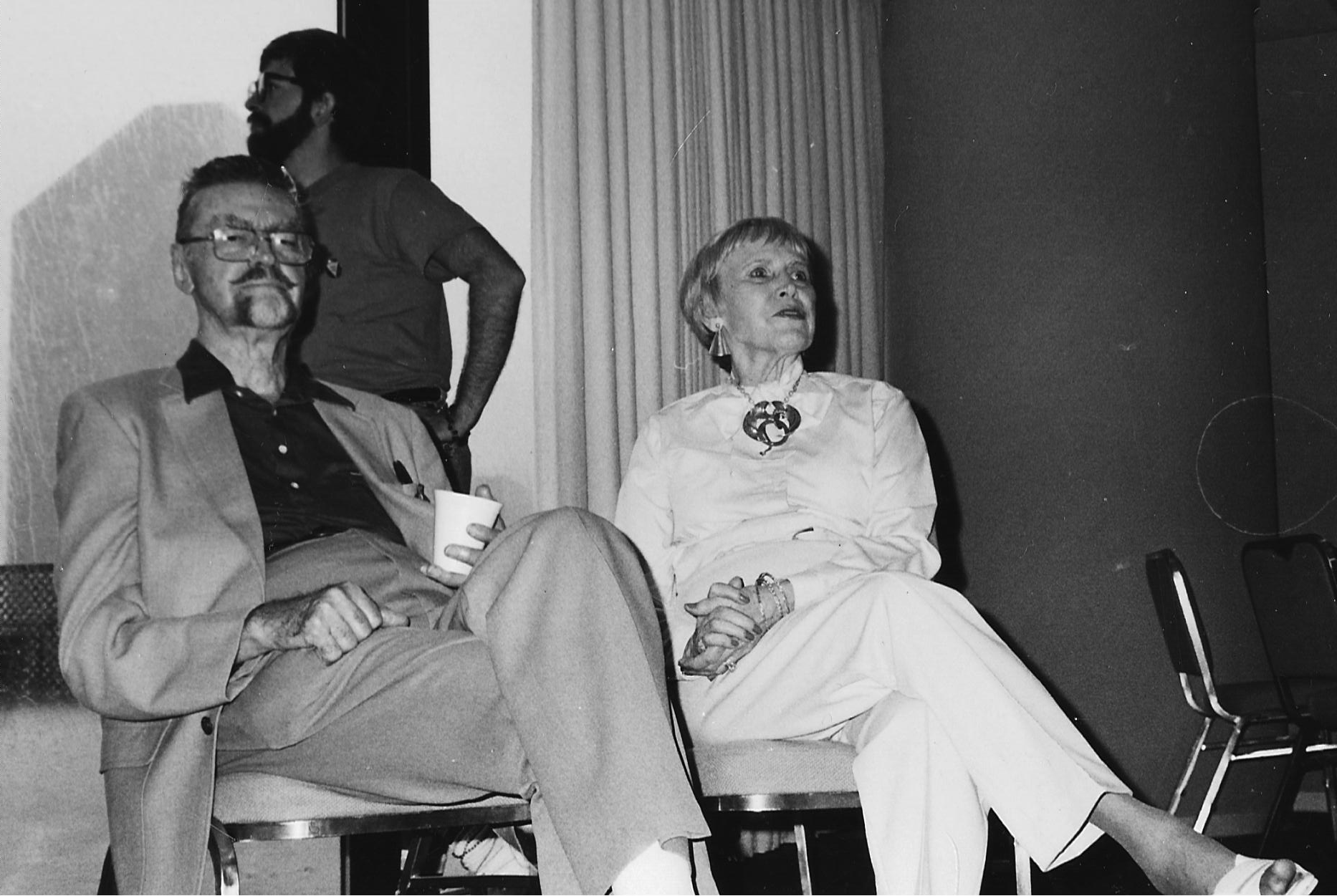
L. Sprague de Camp and Catherine Crook de Camp at Nolacon II in New Orleans (1988)

Robert E. Howard's legacy extended after his death in 1936. Howard's most famous character, Conan the Barbarian, has a pop-culture imprint that has been compared to such icons as Tarzan of the Apes, Count Dracula, Sherlock Holmes, and James Bond. Howard's critical reputation suffered at first but, over the decades, works of Howard scholarship have been published. The first professionally published example of this was L. Sprague de Camp's Dark Valley Destiny (1983), which was followed by other works including Don Herron's The Dark Barbarian (1984) and Mark Finn's Blood & Thunder (2006). Also in 2006, a charity, Robert E. Howard Foundation, was created to promote further scholarship.

Following Robert E. Howard's death, the courts granted his estate to his father, who continued to work with Howard's literary agent Otis Adelbert Kline. Dr. Isaac Howard passed the rights on to his friend Dr. Pere Kuykendall, who passed them to his wife, Alla Ray Kuykendall, and daughter, Alla Ray Morris. Morris left the rights to the widow of her cousin, Zora Mae Bryant, who gave control to her children, Jack Baum and Terry Baum Rogers. The Baums eventually sold their rights to the Swedish (now US) company Paradox Entertainment.

Howard's first published book, A Gent from Bear Creek, was printed in Britain one year after his death. This was followed in the United States by a collection of Howard's stories, Skull-Face and Others (1946) and then the novel Conan the Conqueror (1950). The success of Conan the Conqueror led to a series of Conan books from publisher Gnome Press, the later editor of which was L. Sprague de Camp. The series led to the first Conan pastiche, the novel The Return of Conan by de Camp and Swedish Howard fan Björn Nyberg. De Camp eventually achieved control over the Conan stories and Conan brand in general. Oscar Friend took over from Kline as literary agent and he was followed by his daughter Kittie West. When she closed the agency in 1965, a new agent was required. De Camp was offered the role but he recommended Glenn Lord instead. Lord began as a fan of Howard and had re-discovered many unpublished pieces that would otherwise have been lost, printing them in books such as Always Comes Evening (1957) and his own magazine The Howard Collector (1961–1973). He became responsible for the non-Conan works and later restored, textually-pure versions of the Conan stories themselves.

In 1966, de Camp made a deal with Lancer Books to republish the Conan series, which led to the "First Howard Boom" of the 1970s; their popularity was enhanced by the cover artwork of Frank Frazetta on most of the volumes. Many of his works were reprinted (some printed for the first time) and they expanded into other media such as comic books and films. The Conan stories were increasingly edited by de Camp and the series was extended by pastiches until they replaced the original stories. In response, a puristic movement grew up demanding Howard's original, un-edited stories. The first boom ended in the mid-1980s. In the late 1990s and early 21st century, the "Second Howard Boom" occurred. This saw the printing of new collections of Howard's work, with the restored texts desired by purists. As before, the boom led to new comic books, films and computer games. Howard's house in Cross Plains has been converted into the Robert E. Howard Museum, which has been added to the National Register of Historic Places.

== Adaptations ==
The works of Robert E. Howard have been adapted into multiple media, such as the two Conan films released in the 1980s starring Arnold Schwarzenegger, and another in 2011 starring Jason Momoa. In addition to the Conan films, other adaptations have included Kull the Conqueror (1997) and Solomon Kane (2009). In television, the anthology series Thriller (1961) led the adaptations with an episode based on the short story "Pigeons from Hell". The bulk of the adaptations have, however, been based on Conan with two animated and one live action series. Multiple audio dramas have been adapted, from professional audio books and plays to LibriVox recordings of works in the public domain. Computer games have focussed on Conan, beginning with Conan: Hall of Volta (1984) and continuing on to the MMO Age of Conan: Hyborian Adventures (2008). The first table-top roleplaying game based on Howard's works was TSR's "Conan Unchained!" (1984) for their game Advanced Dungeons & Dragons. The first comic book adaptation was in the Mexican Cuentos de Abuelito – La Reina de la Costa Negra No. 17 (1952). Howard-related comic books continued to be published to the present day.

Howard is an ongoing inspiration for and influence on heavy metal music. Several bands have adapted Howard's works to tracks or entire albums. The British metal band Bal-Sagoth is named after Howard's story "The Gods of Bal-Sagoth".

== Works ==
- Robert E. Howard bibliography (prose)
- List of poems by Robert E. Howard (verse)

== See also ==
- List of horror fiction writers
- List of people from Texas
- List of poets from the United States
- Reptilian conspiracy theory – Robert E. Howard's short story "The Shadow Kingdom" from Weird Tales magazine is the origin of both the sword and sorcery subgenre of fantasy fiction and the conspiracy theory concerning a hidden species of advanced reptilian beings disguised among us while covertly controlling the levers of power, which has been a recurring theme in fiction and conspiracy since the story's publication.
