= East of Samarinda =

1989 short story by Carl Richard Jacobi

- Author: Carl Jacobi
- Cover artist: Gregg Budgett and Gary Dumm
- Language: English
- Genre: Adventure
- Publisher: Bowling Green State University Popular Press
- Publication date: 1989
- Publication place: United States
- Media type: Print (Softback)
- Pages: 229
- ISBN: 0-87972-441-2

East of Samarinda is a collection of stories by author Carl Jacobi. It was released in 1989 by Bowling Green State University Popular Press. Although Jacobi is known mostly for his horror and science fiction stories, this book collects adventure stories set in Borneo and the South Seas. The collection was edited by Carl Jacobi and R. Dixon Smith. Jacobi also provides a preface and Smith wrote the introduction ("Open Hell Without Quarter").

The stories 21 originally appeared in pulp magazines such as Thrilling Adventure and are reprinted in facsimile from the original pulps in which they appeared, including illustrations.

== Setting ==
Fourteen of the short stories are set in Dutch East Borneo, two in British North Borneo, two in New Guinea, two in the South Seas (South China Sea, East China Sea and Southern Pacific Ocean) and one off the coast of the Unfederated Malay States.

== Contents ==
East of Samarinda contains the following stories:

1. "Crocodile"
  - Originally published in Complete Stories, 30 April 1934
2. "Letter of Dismissal"
  - Originally published in Top-Notch, October 1934
3. "Sumpitan"
  - Originally published in Top-Notch, October 1935
4. "Death on Tin Can"
  - Originally published in The Skipper, December 1937
5. "East of Samarinda"
  - Originally published in The Skipper, July 1937
6. "The Jade Scarlotti"
  - Originally published in Short Stories, 10 July 1948
7. "Death's Outpost"
  - Originally published in Thrilling Mystery, May 1939
8. "Leopard Tracks"
  - Originally published in Short Stories, 10 July 1938
9. "Deceit Post"
  - Originally published in Complete Stories, 18 February 1935
10. "Jungle Wires"
  - Originally published in Complete Stories, 24 September 1934
11. "Holt Sails the 'San Hing'"
  - Originally published in Short Stories, 25 January 1938
12. "Quarry"
  - Originally published in Dime Adventure Magazine, December 1935
13. "Trial by Jungle"
  - Originally published in Thrilling Adventures, September 1939
14. "Hamadryad Chair"
  - Originally published in 10 Story Mystery Magazine, February 1942
15. "A Film in the Bush"
  - Originally published in Doc Savage, September 1937
16. "Redemption Trail"
  - Originally published in Thrilling Adventures, October 1941
17. "Black Passage"
  - Originally published in Thrilling Adventures, May 1936
18. "Spider Wires"
  - Originally published in Thrilling Adventures, January 1937
19. "Tiger Island"
  - Originally published in Thrilling Adventures, May 1937
20. "Dead Man's River"
  - Originally published in Thrilling Adventures, January 1937
21. "Submarine I-26"
  - Originally published in Doc Savage, March 1944

== See also ==
- Category:Science fiction short story collections by Carl Jacobi
- Samarinda

== Sources ==
- Jacobi, Carl (1989). East of Samarinda. Bowling Green, Ohio: Bowling Green State University Popular Press. p. 229. ISBN 0-87972-441-2.
