= El Borak =

Francis Xavier Gordon
- El Borak character
- First appearance: "The Daughter of Erlik Khan" (1934)
- Created by: Robert E. Howard

In-universe information
- Alias: El Borak
- Gender: Male
- Nationality: American

El Borak, otherwise known as Francis Xavier Gordon, is a fictional character created by Robert E. Howard. Gordon was a Texan gunfighter from El Paso who had travelled the world and settled in Afghanistan. He is known in Asia for his exploits in that continent.

The character was originally created when Howard was only ten years old, but he did not see print until "The Daughter of Erlik Khan" in the December 1934 issue of Top-Notch. He is likely to have been inspired by real people such as Richard Francis Burton, John Nicholson, "Chinese" Gordon and Lawrence of Arabia as well as the fiction of Talbot Mundy. One of the earliest surviving stories where he made an appearance was a story written by Howard when he was sixteen years old. These stories, however, were not complete and the character itself faded from the author's consciousness for several years. He was revived in 1933 together with another oriental adventurer, Kirby O'Donnell in stories published by Top-Notch, Complete Stories and Thrilling Adventures.

Although Howard is best known for his fantasy fiction, the El Borak stories are straight adventure fiction and only "Three-Bladed Doom" contains a fantasy element.

The background of the El Borak stories is similar to that of the Conan the Barbarian story "The People of the Black Circle" in which Conan is a chieftain of a hill tribe in what corresponds to Afghanistan.

== Character introduction ==
El Borak is the central character of the series, frequently attempting to minimise tribal wars and conflict in the region through guile or direct violence.

== Explanation of the character's name ==
El Borak is Arabic for "The Swift". It is the name given to him in Afghanistan due to his speed and quickness (similar to Buraq, the swift flying steed who carried the Prophet Muhammad). This name is said to be whispered with awe, reverence and fear in Afghanistan particularly by those "who would by force or guile take what was not rightfully theirs." This is most often represented as his speed in drawing his pistol or attacks with another weapon but can also represent his mental agility as well. Both are the defining traits of the character.

== Appearance ==
El Borak is described as shorter than other characters and he has a slender figure. Nevertheless, he is described as "compact" and quite strong. His defining physical ability, however, is the quickness that inspired his pseudonym. El Borak describes his ancestry as Highland Scot and Black Irish, he has black hair but has black eyes instead of the blue typical of the Black Irish.

== Stories ==
Only five El Borak stories were published during Howard's life. The remainder have been printed in the years since his suicide by various publishers.

=== Published during Howard's life ===
- "The Daughter of Erlik Khan" — First published in Top-Notch, December 1934. This was the first published appearance of El Borak.
- "Hawk of the Hills" — First appeared in Top-Notch, June 1935
- "Blood of the Gods" — First published in Top-Notch, July 1935
- "The Country of the Knife" — First published in Complete Stories, August 1936. Alternate title: Sons of the Hawk
- "Son of the White Wolf" — First published in Thrilling Adventures, December 1936

=== Posthumous publications ===
- "The Lost Valley of Iskander" — First published in The Lost Valley of Iskander 1974. Alternate title: Swords of the Hills
- "Three-Bladed Doom" — First published in REH: Lone Star Fictioneer #4, Nemedian Chronicles, Spring 1976, note there are two versions of different lengths.
- "Intrigue in Kurdistan" — First published in the chapbook Pulse Pounding Adventure Stories #1 (December 1986) published by Cryptic Publications
- "The Coming of El Borak" — First published in The Coming of El Borak, September 1987
- "El Borak" - This was the title of two different short stories, neither of which was published within Howard's lifetime. The first story was printed in the chapbook The Coming of El Borak (September 1987). The second story was printed shortly afterwards in the chapbook North of Khyber (December 1987). This story also features another of Howard's characters, The Sonora Kid. Both were published by Cryptic Publications.
- "The Iron Terror" — First published in the chapbook The Coming of El Borak (September 1987).
- "Khoda Khan's Tale" — First published in the chapbook The Coming of El Borak (September 1987).
- "The Land of Mystery" — First published in the chapbook North of Khyber (December 1987). The story also features another of Howard's characters, The Sonora Kid.
- "North of Khyber" — First published in North of the Khyber, December 1987
- "A Power Among the Islands" — First published in the chapbook North of Khyber (December 1987). The story also features another of Howard's characters, The Sonora Kid.
- "The Shunned Castle" — First published in the chapbook North of Khyber (December 1987). The story also features another of Howard's characters, The Sonora Kid.

=== Unfinished stories ===
There are two fragments of El Borak stories that Howard did not finish before his death. Both were untitled. The first begins with the line "Gordon, the American whom the Arabs call El Borak..." while the other begins "When Yar Ali Khan crept into the camp of Zumal Khan..."
