= Son of the White Wolf =

- Short story by Robert E. Howard
- Country: United States
- Language: English
- Genre: Adventure

Publication
- Published in: Thrilling Adventures
- Publication type: Pulp magazine
- Publication date: December 1936
- Series: El Borak

"Son of the White Wolf" is an El Borak short story by American writer Robert E. Howard. It was originally published in the December 1936 issue of the pulp magazine Thrilling Adventures.
