= Hawk of the Hills (short story) =

Short story by Robert E. Howard

- Short story by Robert E. Howard
- Country: United States
- Language: English
- Genre: Adventure

Publication
- Published in: Top-Notch
- Publication type: Pulp magazine
- Publication date: June 1935
- Series: El Borak

"Hawk of the Hills" is an El Borak short story by Robert E. Howard. It was originally published in the June 1935 issue of the pulp magazine Top-Notch, one of only five of the El Borak stories published within Howard's lifetime. The story was featured as the cover of that issue.

The story is regarded as one of the best of Howard's works and is currently in print in the Del Rey collection The Best of Robert E. Howard Volume 1: Crimson Shadows.

== Plot introduction ==
El Borak leads the Afridi tribe in a war against the Orakzai and their chief Afdal Khan in early twentieth century Afghanistan. The war brings in British agents from across the border and has Russian influence in the region behind it.

== Plot summary ==
The story begins with El Borak climbing a cliff-face to escape pursuit. Afdal Khan, the chief of the Orakzai, had invited the Afridis and their ally El Borak to a feast before swiftly attacking and slaughtering the chiefs of the other tribe. El Borak was the only survivor.

The focus shifts to Geoffrey Willoughby some time later. Willoughby is a British diplomatic agent who, along with secret service agent Suleiman, has been sent to quell violence in Afghanistan. El Borak has led the Afridis in a successful tribal war against the Orakzai (later revealing that he adapted Apache tactics to do so). The British agents have been escorted by Baber Ali, the uncle of Afdal Khan, to meet El Borak at a location known as Shaitan's Minaret. El Borak, however, insists that the only way the conflict would end is with Afdal Khan's death. He also suggests that the Orakzai have an ulterior motive, they are working with the Russians to take over all trade in the region, for which they needed the wells owned by the Afridis.

When Willoughby returns from the meeting unsuccessful, Baber Ali abandons them and rides away. Both agents realise that this is effectively a death sentence in Afghanistan but consider their best action to brazen it out and travel back to Fort Ghazrael with their Afghan escort. However, when camping for the night, the escort turn on them and kill Suleiman. Willoughby escapes into the wilderness but is attacked and knocked out by an unknown assailant. He wakes to find himself under fire in a cave with El Borak and a small group of Afridis. To El Borak's anger, he at first assumes that he is the Texan's prisoner. El Borak tricks Baber Ali, leading the besieging Afghans outside the cave, into revealing his intention to kill Willoughby. Too late the Orakzai realised that he would be responsible if anything happened to the British subjects and returned. When he found Suleiman dead he had no choice but to kill Willoughby as well and remove all evidence, otherwise the British government would insist on his death.

The besieged group stay in the cave until the moon sets enough to place the cave mouth in darkness. Unknown to the besiegers, there is a small rear entrance to the cave. Using a rope of belts and turbans, they individually climb down from this to a valley beyond. However, before El Borak can escape, the Afridi holding the rope is killed by attacking Orakzai. He orders the Afridi to escape because the whole opposing force could be on them shortly. It is only when he returns to the cave mouth to find it still under enemy fire that he realises that the group at the rear must have been unofficial stragglers and Baber Ali knows nothing about the escape. El Borak has trapped himself in the cave with no remaining means of escape.

When the moon has completely set, the Orakzai rush the cave under cover of darkness. El Borak, however, has fashioned his rifle into a small bomb. Distracting his enemies with an explosion he escapes into a nearby gully. He grapples with and kills the only Afghan he encounters, before stealing a horse and leaving with his enemy still completely unaware. The Afridis take Willoughby to their stronghold, Akbar's Castle, an old Mughal outpost. The garrison of the castle verbally abuse Willoughby's escort for abandoning El Borak, despite doing so at his orders, and quickly organise a rescue party. Before they can out, El Borak appears riding Baber Ali's own horse.

Willoughby, exhausted by recent events falls asleep. Again, he is woken by the sound of gunfire. Ali Baber, having deduced the events of the previous night, has again laid siege to El Borak and company, this time with a much larger force. Besieging Akbar's Castle is futile, however, and both sides are aware of it. Baber Ali nevertheless persists.

Willoughby realises that he can end everything if he can get out to Fort Ghazrael. Afdal Khan would guarantee his safe exit, because "Afdal knows he can't afford to let his clan kill an Englishman", if he could only be contacted. The British agent comes up with the idea of writing a letter but rejects it as it cannot be delivered. El Borak offers to sneak out at night, as only he can, and deliver it to the nearest Orakzai outpost. Afdal would need to turn up in person to guarantee Willoughby's safety but will not go near El Borak. This is solved by a nearby outcrop of rocks within view of El Borak's powerful telescope, in which Afdal would be visible but at a safe distance.

El Borak is gone for sometime but Willoughby spots Afdal Khan while the Texan is sleeping shortly after he returned. Willoughby goes out alone to meet the Orakzai. Shortly into their meeting, Afdal announces that although he has failed to achieve a diplomatic solution Willoughby's death will serve almost as well. He intends to kill him and blame El Borak, which will bring British and Afghan forces against him. Before killing Willoughby, Afdal confirms that he started the feud to gain control of the wells that dominate the caravan routes in the region. The Russians will pay him a lot for his assistance in smuggling arms to Afghanistan, Kashmir and India. He even believes that they will eventually make him "Amir of Afghanistan."

Just as Afdal is about to kill Willoughby, El Borak appears from hiding. Both men agree to a duel to the death with swords. The two are both skilled and fight for some time, Afdal Khan more quick and animated while El Borak maintains a steady stance. At the end, El Borak ducks the Afghan's blade and almost cuts him in two with his own. The feud ends with Afdal Khan's death just as El Borak had said it must.

== Characters in Hawk of the Hills ==
- El Borak: Francis Xavier Gordon, a Texan in Afghanistan
- Afdal Khan: The Orakzai chief and instigator of the tribal war
- Geoffrey Willoughby: British diplomatic agent
- Suleiman: Punjabi Muslim. British secret service agent posing as Willoughby's servant
- Baber Ali: Uncle of Afdal Khan
- Yar Ali Khan: Afridi captain of the garrison at Akbar's Castle
- Khoda Khan: Afridi companion of El Borak.

== Significance and reception ==
The Dr Hermes review highlights the freshness of having the view point character be an English diplomat. The "satisfying and conclusive ending" in the form of the duel between Afdal Khan and El Borak, is also highlighted. The influence of Harold Lamb and Talbot Mundy on Howard and the El Borak stories is shown through El Borak always having a plan and hidden goal.

The Pulp and Dagger review highlights the clash of philosophies between Willoughby and El Borak as the core of the story. The level of characterization is also praised and this story is noted as the reviewer's favourite of the series.

The story is currently in print in the first volume of Del Rey's The Best of Robert E. Howard.

== Publication history ==
- Top-Notch, June 1935
- Howard, Robert E. (1974). The Lost Valley of Iskander. FAX.
- Howard, Robert E. (January 1976). The Lost Valley of Iskander. Zebra.
- Howard, Robert E. (1976). The Lost Valley of Iskander. Orbit.
- Howard, Robert E. (September 1979). The Lost Valley of Iskander. Berkley.
- Howard, Robert E. (November 1986). The Lost Valley of Iskander. Ace.
- Howard, Robert E. (April 2005). Blood of the Gods and Other Stories. Girasol Collectables.
- Howard, Robert E. (March 2007). The 'El Borak' Stories. Echo Library.
- Howard, Robert E. (August 2007). The Best of Robert E. Howard Volume 1: Crimson Shadows. Del Rey. ISBN 978-0-345-49018-6.

== Quotations ==
- "There are only you and I and Allah to see--and Allah hates infidels!" - Afdal Khan to Willoughby
- "There is no one here save the Englishman, you, I and Allah--and Allah hates swine!" - El Borak to Afdal Khan shortly afterwards
