= Lost Valley =

Lost Valley may be:

- Lost Valley (Antarctica)
- Lost Valley Scout Reservation, a Boy Scouts of America camp in California
- Lost Valley Ski Area, in Maine, United States
- Lost Valley Educational Center, in Oregon, United States
- "The Lost Valley of Iskander", a short story by Robert E. Howard, published in 1974
- Lost Valley (Arkansas), a point near Arkansas Highway 74
- Lost Valley (film), a 1997 New Zealand film
- Coire Gabhail, the Lost Valley or Hidden Valley in Bidean nam Bian in Scotland
