= Hawk of the Hills =

Hawk of the Hills may refer to:

- Hawk of the Hills (1927 serial), a 1927 Pathé serial directed by Spencer Gordon Bennet
- Hawk of the Hills (1929 film), a 1929 Pathé Western directed by Spencer Gordon Bennet
- Hawk of the Hills (short story), a 1935 El Borak story by Robert E. Howard
