= Blood of the Gods =

- Short story by Robert E. Howard
- Country: United States
- Language: English
- Genre: Adventure

Publication
- Published in: Top-Notch
- Publication type: Pulp magazine
- Publication date: July 1935
- Series: El Borak

"Blood of the Gods" is an El Borak short story by Robert E. Howard. It was originally published in the July 1935 issue of the pulp magazine Top-Notch.

== Plot ==
A group of soldiers of fortune seek a set of matched rubies called the Blood of the Gods, owned by al Wazir. To find it, they capture an Arab who they believe knows the location of al Wazir, who has become a desert hermit. After the Arab agrees to help them, despite his fear of el Borak, a friend of al Wazir who leads the caravan to al Wazir's hermitage and reveals al Wazir's location at the Caves of El Khour, the Arab is shot by one of el Borak's other allies, Salim.

Salim, wounded during the confrontation with the soldiers of fortune, alerts el Borak—Francis Xavier Gordon, an American adventurer—to the threat to al Wazir. El Borak immediately departs for the Caves to protect al Wazir, and is ambushed on his way there by one of his old tribal foes, the Ruweila. His camel killed in the ambush, he continues his way on foot to the Well of Amir Khan, an oasis that he intends to replenish his water supplies at before he continues to the Caves of El Khour. He kills three tribesmen guarding the Well and continues on foot to the Caves.

El Borak arrives at the Caves of el Khour to find al Wazir missing and his supplies and belongings in disarray, unusual for al Wazir. There is no sign of the soldiers of fortune, but el Borak is aware of stealthy movement inside the Caves. El Borak finally finds al Wazir, naked, bearded, and apparently insane. Al Wazir attacks el Borak, who subdues al Wazir and ties him up.

While trying to care for al Wazir, el Borak is alerted to the arrival of English adventurer Hawkston, the last of the surviving soldiers of fortune, who had also clashed with the Ruweila. Hawkston and el Borak agree to a truce to defend the Caves—and their lives—from the Ruweila. The Ruweila find a hidden entrance into the Caves and engage the pair in close combat. After repulsing the attack, el Borak discovers that al Wazir has escaped his bonds and is missing.

The Ruweila attack again, and el Borak and Hawkston expend their ammunition. Al Wazir, still crazed, kills the Ruweila's sheikh, and is mistaken by the superstitious tribesman as a djinn, causing them to flee. Hawkston and el Borak agree to continue their truce until they can get out of the desert. However, Hawkston attacks el Borak once al Wazir reappears, stating that he no longer needs el Borak. El Borak defeats Hawkston, and discovers that a snap shot fired by Hawkston had creased al Wazir's head and restored his senses. Al Wazir reveals that he had been injured in an accident which caused him to lose his senses. As a final irony, al Wazir reveals that he had thrown the Blood of the Gods into the ocean before he had left for the Caves.
