= The Daughter of Erlik Khan =

- Short story by Robert E. Howard
- Country: United States
- Language: English
- Genre: Adventure

Publication
- Published in: Top-Notch
- Publication type: Pulp magazine
- Publication date: December 1934
- Series: El Borak

"The Daughter of Erlik Khan" is an El Borak short story by Robert E. Howard. It was originally published in the December 1934 issue of the pulp magazine Top-Notch.
