= The Coming of El Borak =

- Short story by Robert E. Howard
- First edition
- Country: United States
- Language: English
- Genre: Adventure

Publication
- Published in: The Coming of El Borak
- Publication type: Chapbook
- Publisher: Cryptic Publications
- Publication date: September 1987
- Series: El Borak

"The Coming of El Borak" is an El Borak short story by Robert E. Howard. First printed in the chapbook The Coming of El Borak (September 1987), it was not published in Howard's lifetime. The chapbook features art by Stephen Fabian, and was edited by Robert M. Price.

== Contents ==
- "Introduction" — Essay by Robert M. Price
- "The Coming of El Borak"
- "Khoda Khan's Tale"
- "The Iron Terror"
- "Fragment" ("Gordon, the American...")
- "El Borak" ("I emptied my revolver...")

"El Borak" is the title of two different short stories, neither of which were finished or published within Howard's lifetime. The first story was printed in the chapbook The Coming of El Borak, in September 1987 ("I emptied my revolver..."), while the second story was printed shortly afterwards, in the chapbook North of Khyber, in December 1987 ("Were you ever stranded..."). This second story also features another of Howard's characters, The Sonora Kid. Both chapbooks were published by Cryptic Publications.
