= Portraits in Moonlight =

- Dust-jacket illustration by Frank Utpatel.
- Author: Carl Jacobi
- Cover artist: Frank Utpatel
- Language: English
- Genre: Fantasy, horror, science fiction
- Publisher: Arkham House
- Publication date: 1964
- Publication place: United States
- Media type: Print (hardback)
- Pages: 213

Portraits in Moonlight is a collection of stories by American author Carl Jacobi. It was released during 1964 by Arkham House with an edition of 1,987 copies and was the author's second collection published by Arkham House. Half of the stories had been published originally in the magazine Weird Tales. Some of the stories are science fiction. The volume is dedicated to the memory of Jacobi's father.

== Contents ==
Portraits in Moonlight features the following tales:

1. "Portrait in Moonlight"
2. "Witches in the Cornfield"
3. "The Martian Calendar"
4. "The Corbie Door"
5. "Tepondicon"
6. "Incident at the Galloping Horse"
7. "Made in Tanganyika"
8. "Matthew South and Company"
9. "Long Voyage"
10. "The Historian"
11. "Lodana"
12. "The Lorenzo Watch"
13. "The La Prello Paper"
14. "The Spanish Camera"

== Sources ==
- Jaffery, Sheldon (1989). The Arkham House Companion. Mercer Island, WA: Starmont House, Inc. p. 75. ISBN 1-55742-005-X.
- Chalker, Jack L.; Mark Owings (1998). The Science-Fantasy Publishers: A Bibliographic History, 1923-1998. Westminster, MD and Baltimore: Mirage Press, Ltd. pp. 41–42.
- Joshi, S.T. (1999). Sixty Years of Arkham House: A History and Bibliography. Sauk City, WI: Arkham House. p. 86. ISBN 0-87054-176-5.
- Nielsen, Leon (2004). Arkham House Books: A Collector's Guide. Jefferson, NC and London: McFarland & Company, Inc. p. 92. ISBN 0-7864-1785-4.
