= North of Khyber =

- Short story by Robert E. Howard
- First edition
- Country: United States
- Language: English
- Genre: Adventure

Publication
- Published in: North of Khyber
- Publication type: Chapbook
- Publisher: Cryptic Publications
- Publication date: December 1987
- Series: El Borak & The Sonora Kid

"North of Khyber" is an El Borak short story by Robert E. Howard. It was not published within Howard's lifetime - it was first printed in the chapbook North of Khyber (December 1987). All stories in the chapbook also feature another of Howard's characters, The Sonora Kid.

== Contents ==
- "Introduction" — Essay by Robert M. Price
- "North of Khyber"
- "The Land of Mystery"
- "El Borak" ("Were you ever stranded...")
- "The Shunned Castle"
- "A Power Among the Islands"

"El Borak" is the title of two different short stories, neither of which were finished or published within Howard's lifetime. The first story was printed in the chapbook The Coming of El Borak, in September 1987 ("I emptied my revolver..."), while the second story was printed shortly afterwards, in the chapbook North of Khyber, in December 1987 ("Were you ever stranded..."). This second story also features another of Howard's characters, The Sonora Kid. Both chapbooks were published by Cryptic Publications.
