= Shiba Yoshiyuki =

Japanese samurai lord and daimyo

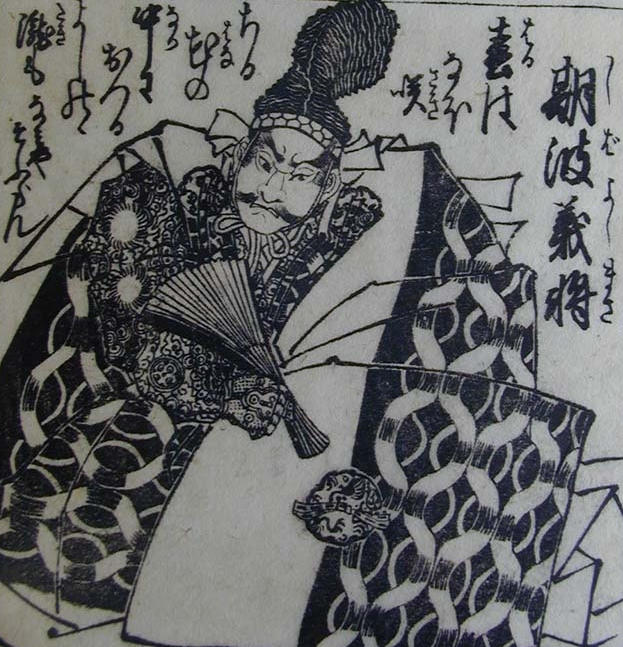
Shiba Yoshimasa

Shiba Yoshiyuki (斯波 義将; 1350 – 1410) was a Japanese samurai lord and daimyo during the Muromachi period.

== Biography ==
Yoshimasa was the son of Shiba Takatsune.

During the Ashikaga shogunate, Yoshimasa held the office of kanrei from 1379 to 1397.

== See also ==
- Shiba clan
- Author of "The Chikubashō"
