= Durandal (novel) =

1981 novel by Harold Lamb

- Dust-jacket from the 1981 edition
- Author: Harold Lamb
- Illustrator: George Barr and Alicia Austin
- Cover artist: George Barr and Alicia Austin
- Language: English
- Genre: Fantasy novel
- Publisher: Donald M. Grant, Publisher, Inc.
- Publication date: 1981
- Publication place: United States
- Media type: Print (Hardback)
- Pages: 156 pp
- ISBN: 0-937986-45-3
- OCLC: 8514042
- Dewey Decimal: 813/.52 19
- LC Class: PZ7.L164 Dt 1981
- Followed by: The Sea of the Ravens

Durandal is a novel of historical fiction by Harold Lamb. The first part of a 1931 novel (see below), it was published as a stand-alone book titled simply Durandal in 1981 by Donald M. Grant, Publisher in an edition of 1,875 copies of which 400 were boxed and signed by the artists. Intended as the first part in a proposed trilogy, it was followed in 1983 by The Sea of the Ravens, comprising the second section of the 1931 novel. A final volume to complete the trilogy, to be titled Rusudan, has yet to be published. The book has illustrations by George Barr and Alicia Austin.

The Donald M. Grant editions contain Lamb's original introductions, which were not included in the 1931 edition. In this original introduction to Durandal, Lamb commented, “the legend that the Arabs took the sword of Roland with them to Africa and hence to Asia Minor, I have seen and read, but cannot recall where or when. A reading of The Song of Roland does not yield any mention of the sword Durandal after the death of the hero. It is just as reasonable to assume that the sword was taken by the Arabs (Moors) as that it remained lying under Roland’s body until the Franks arrived on the battlefield a good many hours later.”

Lamb's original novel titled Durandal: A Crusader in the Horde, was published in 1931 by Doubleday, and consisted of three stories (Durandal, Sea of Ravens and Rusudan), which first appeared in Adventure in 1926 & 1927, linked by additional material into a whole.

== Plot introduction ==
The tale of two Crusaders, betrayed by the scheming Christian Emperor Theodore and pursued by Muslim swordsmen, who discover the sword of Roland.
