= The Three Palladins =

1977 novel by Harold Lamb

- Dust-jacket from the first edition
- Author: Harold Lamb
- Illustrator: Cathy Hill
- Cover artist: Cathy Hill
- Language: English
- Genre: Fantasy novel
- Publisher: Donald M. Grant, Publisher, Inc.
- Publication date: 1977
- Publication place: United States
- Media type: Print (Hardback)
- Pages: 244 pp
- OCLC: 4158927

The Three Palladins is a novel of historical fiction by Harold Lamb. It was first published in book form in 1977 by Donald M. Grant, Publisher, Inc. in an edition of 1,350 copies. The novel originally appeared in the magazine Adventure in 1923. The Three Palladins was later reprinted in the 2010 omnibus volume Swords From The East.

== Plot ==
The novel is an adventure story about the rise of the young Genghis Khan and the fabled kingdom of Prester John. The hero of The Three Palladins is a young Chinese prince, Mingan.

== Influence ==
Robert E. Howard read The Three Palladins on its magazine publication. Howard later quoted from the book in his 1923 amateur magazine, The Golden Caliph. The scene in Howard's Conan story The Scarlet Citadel where Conan lifts a villain and hurls him to his death off a high building, is similar to a scene in The Three Palladins.
