= Howard Andrew Jones =

American speculative fiction author (1968–2025)

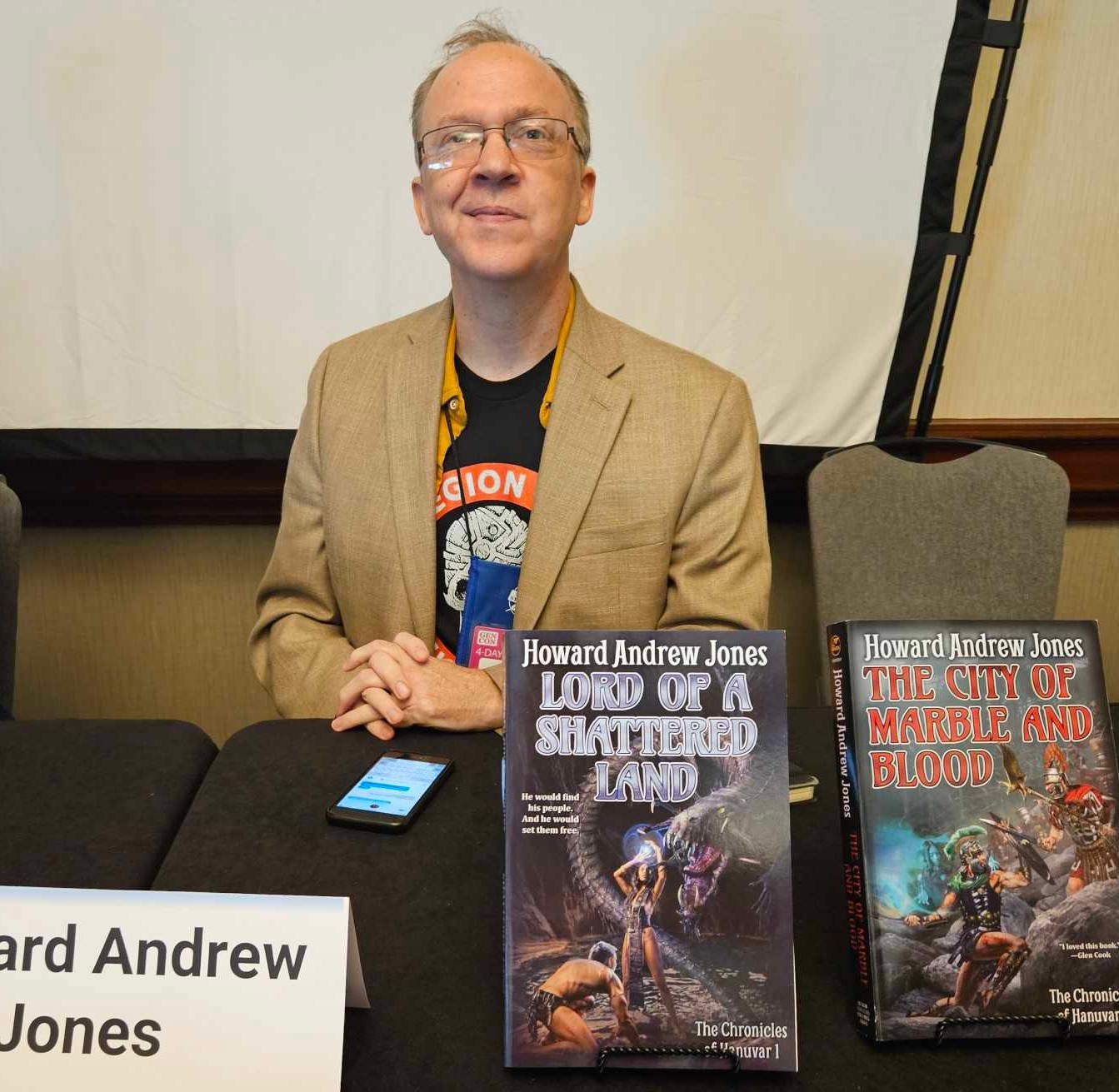
- Jones at GenCon 2024 in Indianapolis
- Born: July 19, 1968; Terre Haute, Indiana, U.S.
- Died: January 16, 2025 (aged 56)
- Occupations: Author, editor
- Writing career
- Genres: Speculative fiction; fantasy; sword and sorcery; historical fiction
- Notable works: The Chronicles of Hanuvar series; The Chronicles of Sword and Sand series; Ring-Sworn trilogy
- Website: www.howardandrewjones.com

Howard Andrew Jones (July 19, 1968 – January 16, 2025) was an American speculative fiction and fantasy author and editor, known for The Chronicles of Hanuvar series, The Chronicles of Sword and Sand series and The Ring-Sworn trilogy. He had also written Pathfinder Tales, tie-in fiction novels in the world of the Pathfinder Roleplaying Game, published by Paizo. He was the editor of Tales from the Magician's Skull and had served as a Managing Editor at Black Gate since 2004. He assembled and edited a series of eight volumes of the short fiction of Harold Lamb for publication by Bison Books.

== Background ==
Jones was born in Terre Haute, Indiana, July 19, 1968. He worked in the television industry as a cameraman and production assistant, as an editor of technical books, and as an English professor at the University of Southern Indiana. He lived on a small family farm in Indiana.

Jones was diagnosed with brain cancer in September 2024, and died on January 16, 2025, at the age of 56.

== Career ==
Jones first encountered the work of Harold Lamb in high school and became a lifelong fan, which led, years later, to him collecting much of Lamb's short fiction work into an eight volume series for Bison Books. In an interview with Black Gate, he recounts how many of the stories, which had been published in pulp magazines, were gathered and bound for personal use by another fan, Dr. John Drury Clark, whose widow sold the collection to Jones. This collection included much of the works included in the collected volumes he later assembled and edited.

Jones' debut historical fantasy novel The Desert of Souls, the first in The Chronicles of Sword and Sand series, also known as the Dabir & Asim stories after the two principal characters, was published in 2011 to critical acclaim and was included on Locus Magazine's 2011 Recommended Reading List for Best First Novel. He has written numerous short fiction pieces set in the same world, many of which were collected in The Waters of Eternity. The sequel novel, The Bones of the Old Ones, received a starred review from Publishers Weekly. On the author's website, he states that the story "The Sword and the Djinn" is an excerpt from an unfinished third novel in the series entitled The Maiden's Eye.

Jones has written four novels and several short fiction pieces set in Golarion, the world of the Pathfinder Roleplaying Game. The cover art by Tyler Jacobson for his Pathfinder Tales novel Beyond the Pool of Stars won the 2016 Chesley Award for Best Cover Illustration - Paperback Book.

His second independent series, the epic fantasy Ring-Sworn trilogy, debuted in 2018 with the novel For the Killing of Kings and received critical acclaim, including a starred review from Publishers Weekly. The concluding volume of the trilogy, When the Goddess Wakes also received a starred review from Publishers Weekly.

In 2021, Jones was nominated for The Robert E. Howard Foundation Awards - The Venarium Award for Emerging Scholar.

In 2022, Jones signed a five-book deal with Baen Books to publish his Chronicles of Hanuvar series. The first book in the series, Lord of a Shattered Land, is scheduled for release in August 2023, with the second book, The City of Marble and Blood, to follow in October 2023.

== Bibliography ==
=== Novels ===
==== The Chronicles of Sword and Sand ====
- The Desert of Souls (St. Martin's Press, 2011)
- The Bones of the Old Ones (St. Martin's Press, 2012)

==== Ring-Sworn trilogy ====
- For the Killing of Kings (St. Martin's Press, 2018)
- Upon the Flight of the Queen (St. Martin's Press, 2019)
- When the Goddess Wakes (St. Martin's Press, 2021)

==== The Chronicles of Hanuvar ====
- Lord of a Shattered Land (Baen Books, 2023)
- The City of Marble and Blood (Baen Books, 2023)
- Shadow of the Smoking Mountain (Baen Books, 2024)

=== Tie-In novels ===
==== Pathfinder Tales ====
- Plague of Shadows (Paizo Publishing, 2011)
- Stalking the Beast (Paizo Publishing, 2013)
- Beyond the Pool of Stars (Paizo Publishing, 2015)
- Through the Gate in the Sea (Paizo Publishing, 2017)

=== Short fiction ===
==== The Chronicles of Sword and Sand stories ====
- The Waters of Eternity (St. Martin's Press, 2011) - short fiction collection, including:
  - "In Bygone Days"
  - "The Thief of Hearts", first published in Sages & Swords: Heroic Fantasy Anthology, Pitch-Black Books, 2006
  - "The Slayer's Tread"
  - "Sight of Vengeance", first published in Black Gate, 2007
  - "Servant of Iblis", first published in Paradox #5, 2004
  - "The Waters of Eternity"
  - "Marked Man"
- "The Serpent's Heart", first published in Kaiju Rising: Age of Monsters, Ragnarok Publications, 2014
- "The Black Lion", first published in Skelos #2, Skelos Press, 2017
- "The Sword and the Djinn", first published in Guilds & Glaives, Zombies Need Brains, 2018 - excerpt from an unfinished novel The Maiden's Eye
- "Instrument of Vengeance", first published in Heroic Fiction Quarterly, issue 45, 2020
- "The Dragon Planet", first published in Of Gods and Globes II: A Cosmic Anthology, 2020
- "The Palace in the Moonlight", first published in Lightspeed Magazine, issue 132, 2021
- "The Flame and the Bottle", first published in Heroic Fiction Quarterly, issue 54, 2022

==== Hanuvar series ====
- "The Way of Serpents", first published in Goodman Games Gen Con 2016 Program Guide, 2016
- "A Stone's Throw", first published in Glyph #2, Undaunted Press, 2000
- "Crypt of Stars", first published in Tales from the Magician's Skull, No. 1, Goodman Games, 2017
- "The Second Death of Hanuvar", first published in Tales from the Magician's Skull, No. 3, Goodman Games, 2019
- "Course of Blood", first published in Galactic Stew, Zombies Need Brains, 2020
- "From the Darkness Beneath". first published in Terra Incognita: Lost Worlds of Fantasy and Adventure, DMR Books, 2022
- "Shroud of Feathers", first published in Tales from the Magician's Skull, No. 6, Goodman Games, 2022
- "The Warrior’s Way", first published in Weird Tales #366 - Swords And Sorcery, Weird Tales, 2023

==== Other stories ====
- "The Sibylline Books", first published in Andromeda Spaceways Inflight Magazine, issue #9, Andromeda Spaceways Publishing Co-op, 2003
- "Line of Blood", first published in Lords of Swords: Thirteen Stories of Heroic Fantasy, Pitch-Black Books, 2004
- "The Ghost Pearl", first published in Ghost in the Cogs, Broken Eye Books, 2015
- "Crypt of Stars", first published in Savage Scrolls, vol. 1, Pulp Hero Press, 2020
- "Whispers of the Serpent", first published in Scott Oden Presents The Lost Empire of Sol: A Shared World Anthology of Sword & Planet Tales, Rogue Blades Entertainment, 2021

=== Editor ===
- Black Gate magazine (2004–present)
- Tales from the Magician's Skull magazine, published by Goodman Games
- Wolf of the Steppes: The Complete Cossack Adventures, Volume One by Harold Lamb, Bison Books, 2006
- Warriors of the Steppes: The Complete Cossack Adventures, Volume Two by Harold Lamb, Bison Books, 2006
- Riders of the Steppes: The Complete Cossack Adventures, Volume Three by Harold Lamb, Bison Books, 2007
- Swords of the Steppes: The Complete Cossack Adventures, Volume Four by Harold Lamb, Bison Books, 2007
- Swords from the Desert by Harold Lamb, Bison Books, 2009
- Swords from the West by Harold Lamb, Bison Books, 2009
- Swords from the East by Harold Lamb, Bison Books, 2010
- Swords from the Sea by Harold Lamb, Bison Books, 2010

== See also ==
- List of fantasy authors
