= Three-Bladed Doom =

- Short story by Robert E. Howard
- First book edition (1977)
- Country: United States
- Language: English
- Genre: Adventure

Publication
- Published in: REH Lone Star Fictioneer #4
- Publication date: Spring 1976
- Series: El Borak

"Three-Bladed Doom" is an adventure short story by American writer Robert E. Howard, featuring his character El Borak. It was not published within Howard's lifetime.

There are two different versions of this story. The first is shorter (24,000 words) than the second (42,000) words. The short version was printed first, in issue #4 of the magazine REH Lone Star Fictioneer (Spring 1976). The long version was printed the following year in the Zebra paperback Three-Bladed Doom (July 1977). Both of these versions, however, had their beginning and ending substantially re-written by Byron Roark, editor of REH Lone Star Fictioneer. The restored version was printed in issue #10 of the fanzine REH: Two-Gun Raconteur (Winter 2006).

== Other versions ==
This story was re-written by L. Sprague de Camp into the Conan story The Flame Knife. This was first printed in the hardback Tales of Conan (1955). This version was adapted in "Savage Sword of Conan" #31-32.
