= Revelations in Black =

Book by Carl Richard Jacobi

- Dust Jacket Illustration by Ronald Clyne for Revelations in Black by Carl Jacobi
- Author: Carl Jacobi
- Cover artist: Ronald Clyne
- Language: English
- Genre: Fantasy, horror
- Publisher: Arkham House
- Publication date: 1947
- Publication place: United States
- Media type: Print (hardback)
- Pages: 272

Revelations in Black is a collection of fantasy and horror short stories by American writer Carl Jacobi. It was released in 1947 and was the author's first book. It was published by Arkham House with an edition of 3,082 copies.

Most of the stories were published originally in the magazines Weird Tales and Startling Stories.

== Contents ==
Revelations in Black features the following tales:

1. "Revelations in Black"
2. "Phantom Brass"
3. "The Cane"
4. "The Coach on the Ring"
5. "The Kite"
6. "Canal"
7. "The Satanic Piano"
8. "The Last Drive"
9. "The Spectral Pistol"
10. "Sagasta's Last"
11. "The Tomb from Beyond"
12. "The Digging at Pistol Key"
13. "Moss Island"
14. "Carnaby's Fish"
15. "The King and the Knave"
16. "Cosmic Teletype"
17. "A Pair of Swords"
18. "A Study in Darkness"
19. "Mive"
20. "Writing on the Wall"
21. "The Face in the Wind"

== Sources ==
- Jaffery, Sheldon (1989). The Arkham House Companion. Mercer Island, WA: Starmont House, Inc. p. 27. ISBN 1-55742-005-X.
- Chalker, Jack L.; Mark Owings (1998). The Science-Fantasy Publishers: A Bibliographic History, 1923-1998. Westminster, MD and Baltimore: Mirage Press, Ltd. p. 31.
- Joshi, S.T. (1999). Sixty Years of Arkham House: A History and Bibliography. Sauk City, WI: Arkham House. pp. 43–44. ISBN 0-87054-176-5.
- Nielsen, Leon (2004). Arkham House Books: A Collector's Guide. Jefferson, NC and London: McFarland & Company, Inc. pp. 63–64. ISBN 0-7864-1785-4.
