= Carl Richard Jacobi =

American journalist and author

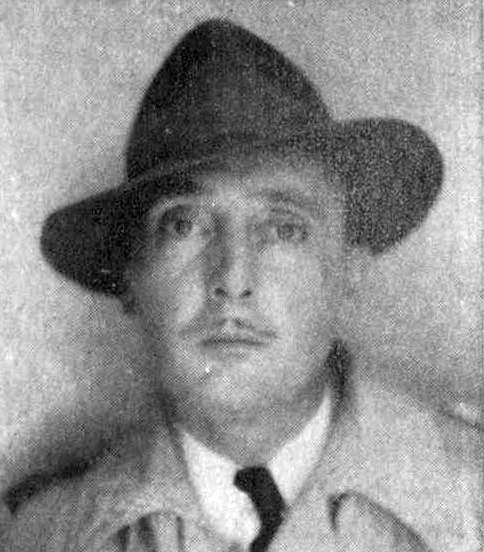
- Carl Jacobi c. 1954
- Born: Carl Richard Jacobi; July 10, 1908; Minneapolis, Minnesota, US
- Died: August 25, 1997 (aged 89); St Louis Park, Minnesota, US
- Other names: Philip Spayne, King Marling, James K. Vermont, Richard Carle, Matthew South, Stephen Benedict, Jackson Cole (house name at Thrilling magazine group/Standard Publications).
- Occupation: Writer
- Known for: "Mive", "Revelations in Black", "Carnaby's Fish", "The Unpleasantness at Carver House", "The Coach on the Ring"

Carl Richard Jacobi (July 10, 1908 – August 25, 1997) was an American journalist and writer. He wrote short stories in the horror and fantasy genres for the pulp magazine market, appearing in such pulps of the bizarre and uncanny as Weird Tales, Ghost Stories, Startling Stories, Thrilling Wonder Stories and Strange Stories. He also wrote stories of crime and adventure which appeared in such pulps as Thrilling Adventures, Complete Stories, Top-Notch, Short Stories, The Skipper, Doc Savage and Dime Adventures Magazine. Jacobi also produced some science fiction, mainly space opera, published in such magazines as Planet Stories. He was one of the last surviving pulp-fictioneers to have contributed to the legendary American horror magazine Weird Tales during its "glory days" (the 1920s and 1930s). His stories have been translated into French, Swedish, Danish, Russian and Dutch.

== Biography ==
=== Early life and education ===
Jacobi was born in Minneapolis, Minnesota in 1908 and lived there throughout his life. He was a lifelong bachelor. He was a voracious reader at an early age, reading Jules Verne, Edgar Allan Poe, H. G. Wells as well as the Frank Merriwell and Tom Swift boys' adventure yarns. Jacobi was always a writer; at his junior high school he earned good pocket-money concocting his own 'dime novels' (short story booklets) and selling them to fellow students as 10 cents-a-piece.

Jacobi attended the University of Minnesota from 1927 to 1930, majoring in English Literature, where he began his writing career in campus magazines and was an undergraduate classmate of Donald Wandrei. He wrote of this period on Thrilling Wonder Stories (June 1939) that "I tried to divide my time between rhetoric courses and the geology lab. As an underclassman I was somewhat undecided whether future life would find me studying rocks and fossils or simply pounding a typewriter. The typewriter won." Jacobi's first stories were published while he was at the university. Long before graduation he made his first professional sale, a short detective tale, "Rumbling Cannon", to Secret Service Stories. This ought to have paid around fifty dollars but Jacobi received nothing since the pulp folded soon after the story was published. The last of the stories he published while at university, "Moss Island", was a graduate's contribution to The Quest of Central High School, and "Mive" (which won a college-wide contest judged by Margaret Culkin Banning), published in the University of Minnesota's The Minnesota Quarterly. Both stories were later sold to Amazing Stories (Winter 1932) and Weird Tales respectively and marked his debut in professional magazines. "Mive" (Weird Tales, 1932) brought him payment of 25 dollars. "Mive" was praised by H. P. Lovecraft in his letter to Jacobi of February 27, 1932: "Mive please me immensely, and I told Wright that I was glad to see at least one story whose weirdness of incident was made convincing by adequate emotional preparation and suitably developed atmosphere." Lovecraft commended Jacobi's work to Derleth and thereby helped set up the long-term relationship Arkham House would have with Jacobi.

Beginning in 1928, Jacobi corresponded with adventure-pulp veteran Arthur O. Friel.

Jacobi's early story "The Monument" (1932) was submitted only once—to Farnsworth Wright of Weird Tales. It was not submitted subsequently but was discovered in a filing cabinet when R. Dixon Smith was researching his biography Lost in the Rentharpian Hills: Spanning the Decades with Carl Jacobi (1985) and finally saw print when included by Smith in Smoke of the Snake (1994).

=== 1930s ===
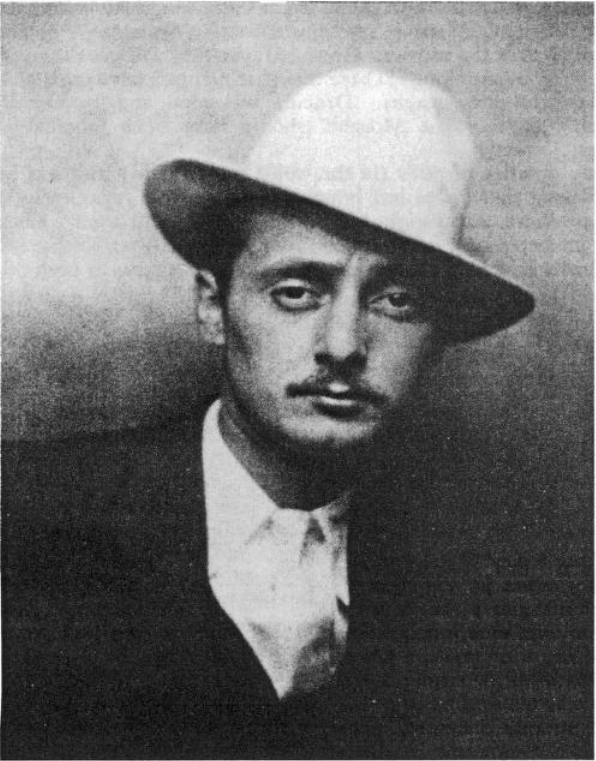
Writer Carl Jacobi on circa 1932

Jacobi joined the editorial staff of The Minnesota Quarterly, and after graduation in 1931, he became a news reporter, reviewer and sub-editor for the Minneapolis Star, as well as a frequent reviewer of books and plays. He also served on the staff of the Minnesota Ski-U-Mah, a campus humor magazine (described on the jackets of Jacobi's books as 'a scholastic publication'). After a while regular hours palled, and he left the Star, renting an office in uptown Minneapolis in which were typewriter, paper, a few reference books, and a list of editorial addresses in New York.

Jacobi met August Derleth in January 1931 when Derleth was visiting Minneapolis to see Donald Wandrei. Jacobi had read Derleth's stories in Weird Tales and his Solar Pons stories in Dragnet and asked to be introduced; they met together, and with Donald Wandrei, for a literary roundtable at Minneapolis' Rainbow Cafe. Though Derleth and Jacobi corresponded for 40 years thereafter, Jacobi saw him but a few times in St Paul and never visited Derleth's home of Sauk City, Wisconsin. Over the following summer, when Derleth worked briefly as an editor for Fawcett Publications, outside Minneapolis, the three men frequently got together for brainstorming sessions.

Jacobi owned his own private retreat, a cabin at Minnewashta in the Carver country outlands of Minneapolis. His intimate familiarity with the terrain and environment there provided the setting for many of his most distinguished stories.

From 1932 until Jacobi's death in 1997, pulp writer Hugh B. Cave corresponded with Jacobi. Scores of their letters are quoted in Cave's memoir Magazines I Remember (Chicago: Tattered Pages Press, 1994), though many of Jacobi's early letters to Cave were lost in a fire in the early 1970s, along with copies of all Cave's early stories. Jacobi and Cave often criticised and improved each other's stories.

Jack Adrian writes:

In the depression years of the early 1930s, the pulp-writer needed as formidable a creative armoury as possible, along with a certain amount of luck, and cunning, to crack even the lowest paying markets. Jacobi had a useful knack for dreaming up memorable milieu against which to set his tales, and bizarre situations that stayed in the mind long after the magazine the story itself was in had been finished and tossed away. He may have been the only writer ever to have a story firmly rejected by the redoubtable Weird Tales editor Farnsworth Wright, only to have Wright, weeks later, begging for the story back, because an incident in it had stuck in his mind. This was "Revelations in Black", a chilling, and much-reprinted, vampire tale set in an old stone farmhouse outside of Minneapolis Jacobi had driven past one night (the house's eerie statue-lined garden, as seen by brilliant moonlight, had caught his eye and his imagination.

Jacobi wrote scores of tales for all the best-known magazines of fantasy and science fiction and was represented in numerous anthologies of imaginative fiction published in the United States, England and New Zealand. His stories were translated into French, Swedish, Danish and Dutch. Many of his tales were published in anthologies edited by Derleth, and Arkham House published his first three short story collections. Stories also appeared in such magazines as Short Stories, Railroad Magazine, The Toronto Star, Wonder Stories, MacLean's magazine, Ghost Stories, Strange Stories, Thrilling Mystery, Startling Stories, Complete Stories, Top-Notch and others. Though best known for his macabre fiction, Jacobi also wrote science fiction, weird-menace yarns and adventure stories.

Already by 1935, Jacobi was seeing a greater percentage of rejected stories. Pressed by financial problems and the need to help his parents survive the Depression, he took a $50 a week job as a continuity writer for the local radio station where he stayed until 1940.

Jacobi was fascinated by adventure tales with a Southeast Asia setting, particularly in regard to Dutch central Borneo and the Maritime Southeast Asia. Jacobi wrote to officials working in Southeast Asia to obtain details for his stories, and he had considerable knowledge of that background in his fiction. According to Jack Adrian, "He would write to those in charge of far-flung outposts deep in the heart of the Borneo jungle, say, demanding geographical detail, obscure ethnic lore, atmospheric and forestall conditions; anything, in short, you couldn't get out of a book. This way he became an acknowledged expert in a field he had created himself, at the same time inventing whole new fiction subgenres, such as "Borneo terror tale", "New Guinea adventure" and so on. Later he turned the same trick with Baluchistan.

In 1939, Jacobi met writer Clifford D. Simak when Simak moved to Minneapolis to take a job with the Minneapolis Star; they became friends. At this time, Jacobi listed his hobbies as "studying the night sky with a 60 power glass; continuing contacts with friends now located in jumping off spots of the South Seas and Malaysia; and collecting old tobacco tins."

=== 1940s and 1950s ===
In 1940–41, Jacobi served as editor of Midwest Media, an advertising and radio trade journal. He then spent some years as a reporter, and reviewer of books and plays, for the Minneapolis Star. He worked for them for many years, writing fiction on the side. Following this, he "travelled a spell; fooled about with telegraphy, both wireless and Morse for another spell; then turned to writing fiction full-time."

At the time of the compilation of Revelations in Black (1947), Jacobi's first collection, Jacobi was at work on a novel, but it is unknown whether this was completed.

Jacobi continued to sell stories to Weird Tales up through the 1950s, with that market taking eighteen of his stories in all.

When the pulp markets collapsed, Jacobi took regular employment with one of the Honeywell defense plants as an electronics inspector, a job he had through WWII and beyond, while writing part-time. He worked the night shift at Honeywell seven days a week, which had a severe effect on both his writing schedule and his health, leading to heart problems.

=== 1960s ===
1964 saw the publication of Jacobi's second collection of weird fiction, Portraits in Moonlight, and several short stories published in magazines.

=== 1970s and 1980s ===
In 1972, Arkham House published Jacobi's third collection of weird fiction, Disclosures in Scarlet. Don Herron, writing in Jack Sullivan's Penguin Encyclopedia of Horror and the Supernatural, calls Jacobi's 1972 story "The Unpleasantness at Carver House" his masterpiece – "a ghoulish tale of horror and madness that may rank with the best work of Robert Aickman and Walter de la Mare in its brilliant use of suggestion. A feeling of unease pervades the story, and its many macabre implications prey on the imagination long after the last sentence is read."

In 1973, Jacobi attended the science-fiction convention Torcon II 31st World Science Fiction Convention, held in Canada, having been persuaded to attend by literary agent Kirby McCauley. There he met such figures as J. Vernon Shea and Robert Bloch. In the same year, Etchings and Odysseys magazine was launched in Minneapolis by Kirby McCauley, John Koblas, Eric Carlson, Joe West and others. Jacobi attended the launch, along with Mary Elizabeth Counselman, who had frequently appeared in the pages of the same magazines as Jacobi. Jacobi also met E. Hoffmann Price (visiting from the West) at both Donald Wandrei's home and at Etchings and Odysseys 'headquarters'. Koblas had come to know Jacobi much earlier, and received encouraging criticism from Jacobi on his manuscripts. Jacobi also came much in contact with poet and novelist Richard L. Tierney, a Twin Cities resident for nine years during the 1970s. During this period, however, Jacobi had suffered a stroke which left one side of his body paralysed and gave him a speech impediment.

1980 saw a collection of Jacobi's stories published in French, under the title Les ecarlates. In 1989 appeared a collection of all-reprint adventure stories from the pulps, East of Samarinda. In the late 1980s, Robert M. Price's Cryptic Publications published a number of obscure Jacobi stories in such magazines as Astro-Adventures, Pulp Stories, Pulse-Pounding Adventure Stories and Shudder Stories.

Jacobi continued to write macabre stories in the 1970s and 1980s. Many are collected in his final volume, The Smoke of the Snake (1994). His last published story, "A Quire of Foolscap" (Whispers, Oct 1987) contains an in-joke: an unfaithful wife and her lover check into a motel "out on Carcosa", an obvious reference to both Ambrose Bierce's "An Inhabitant of Carcosa" and Robert W. Chambers' The King in Yellow, as well as affectionate praise for Karl Edward Wagner's newly established publishing firm (see Carcosa).

=== Later life and death ===
Debilitating illness crippled Jacobi during the final half-decade of his life, although his literary agent and biographer R. Dixon Smith did much to alleviate his various afflictions.

Jacobi died at St Louis Park, Minnesota on August 25, 1997.

A memorial for him was held at the Arcana (convention) 27, Sept 26–28, 1997 at the Holiday Inn Express Bandana Square, Minneapolis.

=== Critical reception ===
Fritz Leiber wrote about Jacobi: "his best tales surely include "Mive", "Carnaby's Fish", "Revelations in Black", "Moss Island", "Portrait in Moonlight", "The Lo Prello Paper", "The Aquarium", "The Singleton Barrier"...and "The Unpleasantness at Carver House".

Writer Don Herron has stated "Jacobi has a genuine bent for original, gruesome invention equal to the best writers who emerged from Weird Tales." Herron also said "Jacobi's finest stories have an exquisitely creepy quality from first paragraph to last" and described the story "The Unpleasantness at Carver House" as "Jacobi's masterpiece".

== Bibliography ==
(All of the following are short story collections)

- Revelations in Black (1947)
- Portraits in Moonlight (1964)
- Disclosures in Scarlet (1972)
- East of Samarinda (1989) (edited by Carl Jacobi and R. Dixon Smith).
- Smoke of the Snake (1994) (edited by Carl Jacobi and R. Dixon Smith). Note: This volume of short stories was originally titled Levitations in Lavender and later, Wayfarers in Darkness. The death of August Derleth scuttled its publication and it circulated in manuscript for some twenty years until being issued by Fedogan and Bremer, 1994. It contains 15 tales, some early, some late, all previously uncollected. The tale "The Street That Wasn't There" is a collaboration with Clifford D. Simak. The volume is dedicated by the editor to Basil Copper and his wife Annie, and illustrated by Jon Arfstrom and Rodger Geberding. The editor's introduction is titled "Waking Up Dead".
- Masters of the Weird Tale: Carl Jacobi. Edited by S. T. Joshi. Introduction by John Pelan. A mammoth collection of Jacobi's best weird fiction.
- Mive and Others: Best Weird Stories of Carl Jacobi Volume 1 (2021) Edited by S.T. Joshi
- Witches in the Corrnfield: Best Weird Stories of Carl Jacobi Volume 2 (2021) Edited by S.T. Joshi

== Sources ==
- Don Herron. "Carl Jacobi" in Jack Sullivan (ed). The Penguin Encyclopedia of Horror and the Supernatural. New York: Viking Penguin, 1986, p. 229.
- W. H. Pugmire (ed). Carl Jacobi: An Appreciation. Pensacola, FL: Stellar Z Productions, 1977.
- Ruber, Peter (ed). Arkham's Masters of Horror. Sauk City, WI: Arkham House, 2000.
- Smith, R. Dixon. Lost in the Rentharpian Hills: Spanning the Decades with Carl Jacobi. Bowling Green, Ohio: Bowling Green State University Press, 1985.
