= The Country of the Knife =

"Country of the Knife"
- Short story by Robert E. Howard
- Country: United States
- Language: English
- Genre: Adventure

Publication
- Published in: Complete Stories
- Publication type: Pulp magazine
- Publication date: August 1936
- Series: El Borak

"Country of the Knife" is an El Borak short story by Robert E. Howard. It was originally published in the August 1936 issue of the pulp magazine Complete Stories. The story is also known as "Sons of the Hawk".
