= Disclosures in Scarlet =

- Dust-jacket illustration by Frank Utpatel.
- Author: Carl Jacobi
- Cover artist: Frank Utpatel
- Language: English
- Genre: Fantasy, horror, science fiction
- Publisher: Arkham House
- Publication date: 1972
- Publication place: United States
- Media type: Print (hardback)
- Pages: 181

Disclosures in Scarlet is a collection of stories by American writer Carl Jacobi. It was released in 1972 and was the author's third collection of stories published by Arkham House. It was published in an edition of 3,127 copies. The stories had been published originally in earlier anthologies edited by August Derleth or in the magazines Galaxy, If, Fantastic Universe and Thrilling Wonder Stories. The volume is dedicated to the memory of Jacobi's mother.

Frank Utpatel's cover illustration depicts "The Unpleasantness at Carver House".

== Contents ==
Disclosures in Scarlet contains the following stories:

1. "The Aquarium". A borderline Cthulhu Mythos story.
2. "The Player at Yellow Silence"
3. "The Unpleasantness at Carver House"
4. "The Cocomacaque"
5. "The Gentleman Is An Epwa"
6. "The Royal Opera House"
7. "Strangers To Straba"
8. "Exit Mr. Smith"
9. "Gentlemen, The Scavengers"
10. "Round Robin"
11. "The White Pinnacle"
12. "Mr. Iper of Hamilton"
13. "The War of the Weeds"
14. "Kincaid's Car"
15. "The Random Quantity"
16. "Sequence"
17. "The Singleton Barrier"

== Sources ==
- Jaffery, Sheldon (1989). The Arkham House Companion. Mercer Island, WA: Starmont House, Inc. p. 103. ISBN 1-55742-005-X.
- Chalker, Jack L.; Mark Owings (1998). The Science-Fantasy Publishers: A Bibliographic History, 1923-1998. Westminster, MD and Baltimore: Mirage Press, Ltd. pp. 49–50.
- Joshi, S.T. (1999). Sixty Years of Arkham House: A History and Bibliography. Sauk City, WI: Arkham House. pp. 128–129. ISBN 0-87054-176-5.
- Nielsen, Leon (2004). Arkham House Books: A Collector's Guide. Jefferson, NC and London: McFarland & Company, Inc. p. 116. ISBN 0-7864-1785-4.
