= The Sonora Kid =

The Sonora Kid, also known as Steve Allison, is a fictional cowboy created by Robert E. Howard. The stories were not printed until more than fifty years after the author's death. The Sonora Kid occasionally crossed over with El Borak, another of Howard's characters.

== Stories ==
- Brotherly Advice (First published in The Sonora Kid, 1988)
- Desert Rendezvous (First published in The Sonora Kid, 1988)
- The Devil's Joker (First published in Cross Plains #6, 1975. Alternate titles: The Devil's Jest, Outlaw Trails)
- Knife, Bullet and Noose (First published in The Howard Collector #6, Spring 1965. Alternate title: Knife, Gun and Noose)
- Red Curls and Bobbed Hair (First published in The Sonora Kid, 1988)
- The Sonora Kid-Cowhand (First published in The Sonora Kid, 1988)
- The Sonora Kid's Winning Hand (First published in The Sonora Kid, 1988)
- The West Tower (Fragment. First published in The Sonora Kid, 1988)

There were also several uncompleted Sonora Kid stories that have since been published. These are listed by their first line:

- "A blazing sun in a blazing sky, reflected from..." (First published in The Sonora Kid, 1988)
- "The Hades Saloon and gambling hall, Buffalotown..." (First published in The Sonora Kid, 1988)
- "The Hot Arizona sun had not risen high enough to heat..." (First published in The Sonora Kid, 1988)
- "Madge Meraldson set her traveling-bag on the station..." (First published in The Sonora Kid, 1988)
- "Steve Allison settled himself down comfortably in..." (First published in The Sonora Kid, 1988)
- "The way it came about that Steve Allison, Timoleon..." (First published in The Sonora Kid, 1988)

The character also appeared in several stories with another of Howard's characters, El Borak:

- El Borak (First published in North of the Khyber, December 1987. Note: Two stories were printed under this title.)
- The Land of Mystery (First published in North of the Khyber, December 1987)
- North of Khyber (First published in North of the Khyber, December 1987)
- A Power Among the Islands (First published in North of the Khyber, December 1987)
- The Shunned Castle (First published in North of the Khyber, December 1987)
- The White Jade Ring (Fragment. First published in The Last of the Trunk, November 2007)
