= The Sea of the Ravens =

1983 novel by Harold Lamb

- Dust-jacket from the first edition
- Author: Harold Lamb
- Illustrator: George Barr and Alicia Austin
- Cover artist: George Barr and Alicia Austin
- Language: English
- Genre: Historical novel
- Publisher: Donald M. Grant, Publisher, Inc.
- Publication date: 1983
- Publication place: United States
- Media type: Print (Hardback)
- Pages: 190 pp
- ISBN: 0-937986-58-5
- OCLC: 13102829
- Preceded by: Durandal

The Sea of the Ravens is a novel of historical fiction by Harold Lamb and illustrators George Barr, and Alicia Austin. It was first published in stand-alone book form in 1983 by Donald M. Grant, Publisher, Inc. in an edition of 1,925 copies of which 200 were specially bound and signed by the artists. The novel originally appeared in Adventure in 1927. It was published with its prequel and sequel novels (which had also appeared in Adventure) with new linking sections by Doubleday in 1931.

The Sea of the Ravens continues the exploits of Durandal, the fabled sword of history and legend. How the sword came into the hands of Hugh of Taranto, whose band of Crusaders is slain through treachery was chronicled in Durandal.

The Sea of the Ravens continues Hugh's adventures as he joins forces with the great khan, Genghis, in a manhunt for an emperor that is without parallel in human annals.
