= The Lost Valley of Iskander =

- Short story by Robert E. Howard
- First edition
- Country: United States
- Language: English
- Genre: Adventure

Publication
- Published in: The Lost Valley of Iskander
- Publication type: Hardback
- Publisher: FAX
- Publication date: 1974
- Series: El Borak

"The Lost Valley of Iskander" is an El Borak short story by Robert E. Howard. It was not published within Howard's lifetime. The first publication was in the FAX Collector's Editions hardback The Lost Valley of Iskander in 1974. Its original title was "Swords of the Hills".

== Plot ==
Francis Xavier Gordon, carrying an oiled silk parcel destined for India, dodges an assassination attempt at night. The parcel contains proof that a Hungarian is plotting to start a religious war in Central Asia, intended to send hordes of religious fanatics boiling across the border into India to plunder on a staggering scale. This Hungarian is pursuing Gordon across Afghanistan when their activity looses a dry avalanche, trapping an innocent local. When Gordon frees the local from the boulder pinning him, the boy invites Gordon to the safety of his home, the valley of Iskander. The inhabitants there descend from a colony of Greek soldiers and their women left behind by Alexander the Great on his campaign through Persia. Abandoned in that remote wilderness on Alexander's death, they established themselves in a remote box canyon and thrive there, isolated from the world by the ferocity of the Afghan hill tribes surrounding them. Gordon is led by his new friend to meet the king of Iskander and in the crowd he sees a Turkish trader he's been acquainted with in the past. That trader swiftly leaves the canyon and finds the Hungarian. The Hungarian hires him to go back, get Gordon's parcel, and deliver it to him. Gordon fights off the trader and his few Iskander assistants, killing one of them. The trader goes immediately to the king, claiming that Gordon is a wizard with a magical, destructive scroll on his body and that Gordon attacked him when he tried to protect the town by taking the scroll to destroy it. Gordon denies this, saying he will kill any man who tries to take the parcel from him. The king takes this as a challenge, and they engage in unarmed combat. Just as Gordon knocks the king out, word comes that an enormous group of Afghans have stormed the fortified entrance to the canyon. The description of their leader matches that of the Hungarian. Gordon, now in charge of Iskander by right of combat, leads their army to oppose the invaders. Eventually he meets the Hungarian in single combat, armed with scimitars. When Gordon kills the Hungarian, the Afghans give up the fight, retreating ahead of the pursuing Iskanders. The king returns to consciousness near the end of battle and realizes that a man who fought like Gordon did could not be a thief or wizard. He finds the deceitful Turk and kills him. He then finds Gordon and explains this, inviting Gordon to stay and live with them, but Gordon demurs, saying he must return to his own people after resting a few days.
