= Samurai in Japanese literature =

Japanese literature about samurai has a long and rich history, and includes written works such as medieval war chronicles, waka poetry, and more.

== Literature of the 13th to 16th centuries ==
=== Heike Monogatari ===
Written in 1371, The Heike Monogatari chronicles the struggle between the Minamoto and Taira clans for control of Japan at the end of the 12th century, a conflict known as the Genpei War. The Heike Monogatari is one of the longest and most beautifully composed of the genre called gunki monogatari, or war chronicles. Clearly depicted throughout the Heike Monogatari is the ideal of the cultivated warrior. This ideal is symbolized in the character 斌 or uruwashii, meaning a situation of balance and harmony between the exterior pattern, or beauty (文), and the interior essence, or substance (武). Men who possess this quality will be as accomplished in the world of the arts as in the world of martial skill and courage.

One such example is Taira no Tadanori:

Friends and foes alike wet their sleeves with tears and said,
"What a pity! Tadanori was a great general,
pre-eminent in the arts of both sword and poetry."
(Kitagawa and Tsuchida, 1975)

The warriors in the Heike Monogatari served as models for the educated warriors of later generations, and the ideals depicted by them were not assumed to be beyond reach. Rather, these ideals were vigorously pursued in the upper echelons of warrior society and recommended as the proper form of the Japanese man of arms. With the Heike Monogatari, the image of the Japanese warrior in literature came to its full maturity. (Wilson, 1982)

=== The Message Of Master Gokurakuji ===
In the year 1256, the Shogunal Deputy in Kyoto, Hōjō Shigetoki (1198-1261) wrote a letter to his son and house elders of his clan. The letter, now known as "The Message Of Master Gokurakuji", emphasized the importance of loyalty to one's master:

When one is serving officially or in the master's court, he should not think of a hundred or a thousand people, but should consider only the importance of the master. Nor should he draw the line at his own life or anything else he considers valuable. Even if the master is being phlegmatic and one goes unrecognized, he should know that he will surely have the divine protection of the gods and Buddhas ... One should rely on neither age nor youth. But he who reveres the master and protects the people may be called a sage.

If one treats men roughly in this existence, he will be roughly treated by them in the next, for karma is never-ending in all things. And if one would rid himself of bad karma in this round of existence, he should treat well those who are not so kind to him. For if one is dealt with kindly by people, he can rejoice in his previous existence; but if he is handled roughly in this world, his previous existence is a matter for regret."

Written in kanamajiri style, "The Message Of Master Gokurakuji" is described as being "....basically concerned with man's moral duties and the ideal behavior for leaders of the warrior class. The predominant tone of the work is a Buddhist sympathy for all living beings and an awareness of the functions of karma. Women, children, and those of lower social standing are to be treated kindly and with regard, and even the concept of loyalty to superiors is dealt with more in a religious sense than a Confucian one."

=== The Chikubashō ===
The feudal lord Shiba Yoshimasa (1350 – 1410) wrote the Chikubashō, a set of precepts for the young men of the Shiba clan. Chikubashō translates literally as "The Bamboo Stilt Anthology". Shiba Yoshimasa was a warrior leader during the Namboku and Muromachi Periods, and was known as an administrator, general, and poet. The Chikubashō consists of one volume and was completed in 1383. William Scott Wilson, author of Ideals of the Samurai describes the Chikubasho as "A short list of precepts written in a classical Japanese style, the Chikubasho displays both the ethical morality of the warrior and the tasteful lifestyle of the aristocracy. Its tone is a combination of a manly Confucian approach reflecting honesty and fairness, and a Buddhist sympathy for others."

In his writings, Shiba Yoshimasa dictated that a warrior should not hesitate to lay down his life for an important cause such as the defense of the emperor:

First, a man whose profession is the use of arms should think and then act upon not only his own fame, but also that of his descendants. He should not scandalize his name forever by holding his one and only life too dear. On the other hand, in the light of this, to consider this life that is given to us only once as nothing more than dust and ashes, and lose it at a time when one should not, would be to gain a reputation that is not worth mentioning. One's main purpose in throwing away his life is to do so either for the sake of the Emperor or in some great undertaking of a military general.

=== Imagawa Ryōshun (1325–1420) ===
Imagawa Ryōshun was a leading general and strategist of his time. His writings are central to the development of bushidō and represent the "Way of the Warrior" at its maturity. Historian Carl Steenstrup describes Imagawa thusly: "He became one of the most influential literary critics of his time, a competent historian, and expert in the philosophy of government, and a prolific poet. In addition, he showed genuine talent for public administration, and gained military experience at an early age." Imagawa wrote prolifically despite being posted to military hotspots by the shōgun. His job was to suppress rebellion by rival samurai clans. Famed for his writings "Nan Taiheiki" and "Michiyukiburi", he penned "The Regulations" to his brother Tadaki in traditional kanbun script. Having taken Buddhist vows, Imagawa Ryoshun was greatly admired as having achieved the warrior ideal—striking a balance between the military and literary arts. According to Steenstrup, "The Letter soon became a historical force in its own right. First it became a textbook of ethics for the Imagawa clan, including its retainers. From the Imagawa, an appreciation of the text spread to other clans; as early as before the outbreak of the Ōnin War, 1467, the Letter appears to have been used as an Office Manual for warrior bureaucrats even outside the Imagawa domains. When the Tokugawa established their hegemony in 1600, the Letter was already in use as a primer. The staff of Ieyasu included the text in the collection of the most important 'house-laws' which they compiled, probably for use as reference material in the drafting of the fundamental laws of the Tokugawa system which were issued in 1615." Even after Japan's feudal era, they were a required study for traditional Japanese as a guide to proper moral behavior. Widely respected, "The Regulations" remained popular until World War II.

=== Hōjō Nagauji (1432–1519) ===
Near the beginning of the 16th century, the Samurai general Hōjō Nagauji (1432–1519) would write:

"Above all, believe in the gods and Buddhas. To worship the gods and Buddhas is the correct conduct for a man. It can be said that one will be in conformity with the feelings of the gods and Buddhas if he will simply make his heart straightforward and calm, respect honestly and wholeheartedly those above him and have pity on those below, consider that which exists to exist and that which does not exist to not exist, and recognize things just as they are. With such a frame of mind, one will have divine protection even though he does not pray. But if his mind is not straight, he had best be prudent lest it be said that he has been abandoned by Heaven, prayerful or not.
It is hardly necessary to record that both Learning and the military arts are the Way of the Warrior, for it is an ancient law that one should have Learning on the left and the martial arts on the right. But this is something that will not be obtainable if one has not prepared for it beforehand."

Hōjō concluded his list of precepts by stating: "To be a samurai is to be polite at all times".

Also known as Hōjō Soun, Lord Hōjō was greatly admired by other daimyōs as a good general and administrator. In addition to attracting more samurai to Odawara, he cut crop taxes from one-half to two-fifths of the harvest, and generally looked out for the welfare of his people.

Hōjō's Twenty-One Precepts were written some time after Hōjō Soun had become a priest, and reflect the fullness of his own experiences. The articles are basically rules for the daily life of the common warrior, and show his familiarity and sympathy for those in the lower echelons. The subject matter ranges from encouraging the study of poetry and horsemanship and the avoidance of games like chess and go, to advice on how to keep one's house in better order and well-protected. There is a strong tone of self-reliance throughout, reflecting Hōjō Soun's unsparingly meticulous character and his own rise to power.

=== Takeda Shingen (1521–1573) ===
The great Warlord Takeda Shingen (1521–1573) wrote in his house codes:

"Everyone knows that if a man doesn't hold filial piety toward his own parents he would also neglect his duties toward his lord. Such a neglect means a disloyalty toward humanity. Therefore such a man doesn't deserve to be called 'samurai'."

=== Katō Kiyomasa (1562–1611) ===
Some famous sengoku daimyōs used the word Bushidō in their writings. In a set of precepts addressed to "All samurai, regardless of rank" the feudal lord Katō Kiyomasa (1562–1611) orders his men to follow it:

If a man does not investigate into the matter of Bushidō daily, it will be difficult for him to die a brave and manly death. Thus it is essential to engrave this business of the warrior into one's mind well ... One should put forth great effort in matters of learning. One should read books concerning military matters, and direct his attention exclusively to the virtues of loyalty and filial piety ... Having been born into the house of a warrior, one's intentions should be to grasp the long and the short swords and to die.

Katō Kiyomasa was one of the most ferocious Samurai who ever lived. The son of a blacksmith, he joined Toyotomi Hideyoshi at age 18 and became legendary for his ferocity in combat, distinguishing himself at the battle of Shizugatake. A senior general, he was awarded lordship of Kumamoto castle in Higo at the age of 26.

Awarded a large fief of 250,000 koku in Higo province, Katō ruthlessly suppressed Christianity. A follower of Nichiren Buddhism, he soon came into conflict with the lord of a neighboring province, a Christian named Konishi Yukinaga. In 1592, Kato Kiyomasa led part of Hideyoshi's army in his campaigns in Korea—alongside his rival, the daimyō Konishi. He occupied the city of Seoul and later crossed the Tumen River into China. Historian Stephen Turnbull describes the horror and destruction of the Korean Invasions in several of his books as seen through the eyes of the Priest Keinen who accompanied the samurai during the campaign. Keinen's diary "Korea Day by Day" was so controversial that it remained unpublished until 1965. Turnbull also described Kato Kiyomasa's motivation for attacking the Jurchens of Manchuria in 1592 was 'to show the savages the mettle of the Japanese'.

Kato stood poised to conquer all of Asia, but a Korean naval blockade prevented him from receiving reinforcements and provisions necessary to support his 150,000-man army.

In 1597, Kato again led Hideyoshi's forces in Korea. The second invasion did not proceed well for the Samurai, but Katō's reputation for valor only increased. Surrounded at Yolsan, the Samurai army held out against incredible odds. Konishi Yukinaga had run into fierce fighting and tried to negotiate a peace treaty with the Korean and Chinese forces surrounding him.

Katō was infuriated by the surrender attempt and upon his return to Japan, he ravaged the Konishi family's neighboring domain in retaliation. Konishi was mercilessly executed in the aftermath of Sekigahara and his domain was awarded to Kato, bringing his total fiefdom to 540,000 koku.

Known for hunting tigers for sport armed with only a spear, the Koreans greatly feared Kato Kiyomasa and called him "Kishokan"—"The Devil General". William Scott Wilson describes Katō Kiyomasa thus: "He was a military man first and last, outlawing even the recitation of poetry, putting the martial arts above all else. His precepts show the single-mindedness and Spartan attitudes of the man, (they) demonstrate emphatically that the warrior's first duty in the early 17th century was simply to "grasp the sword and die." Contemporary accounts of Katō describe him as "awe-inspiring, yet not unfriendly, and a natural leader of men".

=== Nabeshima Naoshige (1538–1618) ===
In the late 16th century, the feudal lord Nabeshima Naoshige (1538–1618) would write a set of wall inscriptions for his followers. Historians describe the wall inscriptions as "Everyday wisdom, rather than house laws proper" Lord Nabeshima's written works also include a mention of bushidō:

"Bushidō is in being crazy to die. Fifty or more could not kill one such a man"

In 1584, Nabeshima Naoshige was the chief retainer for the Lord of Hizen until he was killed in battle by the forces of the powerful Shimazu Clan. After his lord's death, Nabeshima became the true leader of the fiefdom and fought against the Shimazu again in 1587. A Sengoku-period warlord, Nabeshima distinguished himself in battle by killing hundreds of men. He was later sent on Hideyoshi's Korean campaigns where he struck up a friendship with Kato Kiyomasa and upon his return to Hizen, Tokugawa Ieyasu.

At Sekigahara, Lord Nabeshima's son, Katsushige, was convinced to take sides against Tokugawa Ieyasu. Nabeshima wisely recalled him to attack Tokugawa's enemies in Kyūshū, thus saving the clan from disaster. Historians describe Nabeshima as "a survivor and a man of quick intelligence" who saved his domain from invasion several times. His actions and sayings are immortalized in the third chapter of the Hagakure by writer Yamamoto Tsunetomo, a close attendant of Nabeshima Naoshige's grandson, Mitsushige.

== Literature of the 17th to 19th centuries ==
=== Torii Mototada (1539–1600) ===
The Last Statement of Torii Mototada outlines the justification, written to his son, for his decision to remain behind at Fushimi Castle. His decision to remain, even though vastly outnumbered, articulates clearly the beliefs that encapsulates Bushidō philosophy. To serve, to be honourable, to be compassionate and in the end to die a glorious death in battle.

"But that is not the true meaning of being a warrior, and it would be difficult to account as loyalty. Rather, I will stand off the forces of the entire country here, and, without even one one-hundredth of the men necessary to do so, will throw up a defense and die a resplendent death. By doing so I will show that to abandon a castle that should be defended, or to value one's life so much as to avoid danger and to show the enemy one's weakness is not within the family traditions of my master Ieyasu."

and

"Be first of all prudent in your conduct and have correct manners, develop harmony between master and retainers, and have compassion on those beneath you. Be correct in the degree of rewards and punishments, and let there be no partiality in your degree of intimacy with your retainers. the foundation of man's duty as a man is in "truth". Beyond this, there is nothing to be said".

=== Kuroda Nagamasa (1568–1623) ===
In 1622, the daimyō Kuroda Nagamasa (1568–1623) would emphasize the balance of the arts of peace (Confucian learning and literature) with the arts of war, and encourages fairness and sympathy toward the other three classes of people in his writings:

"If a general who is to maintain the province does not have a special consciousness, his task will be a difficult one to attain. His attitudes must not be the same as the ordinary man's. Firstly, he must be correct in manners and etiquette, must not let self-interest into government, and must take care of the common people ... he should not forget even for a moment that he is the model for the four classes of people.

Generally speaking, the master of a province should discharge his duties with love and humanity, should not listen to slander, and should exercise the good. His governing should be as clear as the bright sun in the bright sky, and he should think things over deeply in his mind and make no mistakes.
The arts of peace and the arts of war are like the two wheels of a cart which, lacking one, will have difficulty in standing ... When one has been born into the house of a military commander, he should not forget the arts of war even for a moment ... it is essential that he know the Way of Truth, that he be particular about his efforts in the scrutinizing of every matter, that he be just in all affairs and make no mistakes, that he be correct in recognizing good and evil and demonstrate rewards and punishments clearly, and that he have a deep sympathy for all people. Again, what is called cherishing the Way of the Warrior is not a matter of extolling the martial arts above all things and becoming a scaremonger. It is rather in being well-informed in military strategy, in forever pondering one's resources of pacifying disturbances, in training one's soldiers without remiss, in rewarding those who have done meritorious deeds and punishing those who have committed crimes, in being correct in one's evaluation of bravery and cowardice, and in not forgetting this matter of "the battle" even when the world is at peace. It is simply brashness to make a specialty of the martial arts and to be absorbed in one's individual efforts. Such is certainly not the Way of the Warrior of a provincial lord or military commander.

Kuroda Nagamasa was the son of a Christian daimyō, Kuroda Josui, and was baptized Simeon in 1583. He was to become well known as a great strategist. While still young, Kuroda was put under the auspices of Oda Nobunaga and later served under Toyotomi Hideyoshi. In 1592 and again in 1597 he shared command of the vanguard invasion troops in Korea with Konishi Yukinaga and Katō Kiyomasa. Although he had helped Konishi out of some military tight spots in Korea and was—like Konishi—a Christian, Kuroda supported Tokugawa Ieyasu during the fighting at Sekigahara, and for his efforts was enfieffed at Chikuzen becoming Lord of Fukuoka Castle.

Both Kuroda Nagamasa and his father Josui were well known for their regard for the advice of others, and Nagamasa even set aside one night a month when he would sit with a number of his trusted retainers and allow all to talk freely with the mutual promise that none would become angry over what was said, or gossip about it later. These were called the "Meetings Without Anger". The Regulations given here were written a year before Kuroda's death to his eldest son, Tadayuki.

=== Miyamoto Musashi (1584-1645) ===
==== Go Rin No Sho (The Book of Five Rings) ====
Unlike many other early writings, Miyamoto Musashi's Go Rin no Sho was written in Japanese, rather than the Chinese common in such works. It is also written in a simplistic, straightforward way which makes for somewhat clumsy literary work, its innate clarity has allowed it to be readily accessible to readers across the ages and across cultures.

It is said the warrior's is the twofold way of pen and sword, and he should have a taste for both ways. Even if a man has no natural ability he can be a warrior by sticking assiduously to both divisions of the Way. Generally speaking, the way of the warrior is resolute acceptance of death.

Know the smallest things and the biggest things, the shallowest things and the deepest things. As if it were a straight road mapped out on the ground ... These things cannot be explained in detail. From one thing, know ten thousand things. When you attain the Way of strategy there will not be one thing you cannot see. You must study hard.

==== Dokkodō (1645) ====
He wrote his final work "Dokkodō" (The Way of Walking Alone) in a cave called Reigandō before dying at the age of 60 in 1645. Musashi's last request was to be buried in full armor and bearing his sword, guarding the Tōkaidō road to Edo (present day Tokyo).

=== The 47 rōnin ===
In the 15th year of Genroku, the 47 rōnin of Akō cited Confucian edict as the reason for their famous vendetta. (As Translated by Algernon Bertram Freeman-Mitford (1837–1916), Lord Redesdale, British Ambassador to Japan in his book Tales of Old Japan.)

"...still we, who have eaten of your food, could not without blushing repeat the verse, 'Thou shalt not live under the same heaven nor tread the same earth with the enemy of thy father or lord,' nor could we have dared to leave hell and present ourselves before you in paradise, unless we had carried out the vengeance which you began."

The 47 Rōnin were retainers of Lord Asano Takuminokami Naganori, daimyō of Akō Castle. A man 35 years of age, his family was a branch of the powerful Asano Clan. Strict followers of Confucianism, the Asano Clan was a proud and traditional family.

By the year 1700, Japan had been at peace for a hundred years, unified under the sword of Tokugawa Ieyasu. In the absence of warfare, society prospered and the samurai had become more like government bureaucrats. In the capital of Edo, they preoccupied themselves with literature, artwork and fine clothing. They had even begun to lose their fighting skills. The more traditional families like the Asano looked upon the city samurai with disdain.

To prevent warfare, the shogunate's law of sankin-kōtai (alternate attendance) required all daimyōs to spend every other year in the capitol of Edo as hostages. While in Edo, Lord Asano was chosen to host a very important Imperial envoy during the holidays. Because he was from the countryside he wasn't accustomed to the manners required for such a fancy ceremony. The Tokugawa shōgun's master of ceremonies, Lord Kira Kozukenosuke was appointed to teach Asano the required etiquette. Although it was his job to do so, Lord Kira demanded a bribe of Asano. Asano refused to pay the bribe, offering only a token gift. Kira refused to teach Asano the correct manners and so he made embarrassing mistakes during the ceremony. Lord Kira began taunting Asano's mistakes and so Lord Asano lashed out with his short sword, injuring Kira.

The drawing of a sword inside Edo castle was a capital offense and so Asano was ordered to commit seppuku. Asano's bodyguards rushed home with the bad news, covering more than 425 miles in five days.

Asano's men later learned that Kira had survived the attack. A member of a powerful family, Kira had surveillance placed on Lord Asano's followers.

The leaders of the Akō Domain met to discuss their options. "They discussed siege, capitulation, vengeance and self-immolation." The Bakufu (military government) ordered that Asano's han (domain) be forfeit to the shogunate. "Oishi Kuranosuke decided on capitulation, and about 50 or so agreed with him." The loss of reputation of their lord and the thought of life as rōnin was unbearable to the samurai of Ako. In a solemn and dramatic ceremony, the 322 retainers of Lord Asano secretly swore a blood oath to avenge their dead lord after the surveillance ended.

(note: in Japanese, the word "rōnin" means "wave man", a person destined to wander aimlessly forever, like the waves in the sea. The word came to mean a samurai who was no longer in the service of a lord for some reason or another. It was considered undesirable to be a rōnin, because it meant being without a stipend from a lord, measured in koku of rice, a koku being equal to a roughly 180 liters/150 kg, enough rice to feed a man for one year.)

The warriors of Ako disbursed as Rōnin with Kira's spies watching their every move. They lay in wait for years before attacking. Spies carefully noted the layout of Kira's house. One man married the daughter of the architect who designed Kira's manor, in order to obtain copies of the floorplans. Some of the men divorced their wives and sent them back to their parents. The rōnin endured incredible humiliation. Because they walked in disgrace, they could not enter the service of another lord. Many of the men would even refuse to consider serving Lord Asano's brother, Asano Daigaku, stating "The brother of my lord is not my lord." Some of the Rōnin worked at non-warrior occupations and some even pretended to be drunks. Samurai from other provinces would happen upon the men laying drunk in the streets and ridicule their inaction. The drunken and unruly behavior of the Akō rōnin fooled the spies into lowering their guard after two years.

On a dark and snowy December night (December 14, 1702), disguised as firemen, the 47 men attacked the fortress of Lord Kira. A member of a wealthy family, Kira was surrounded by an armed retinue of 60 samurai bodyguards.

Using a giant sledge, the rōnin stormed the front and back gates at the same time. Archers were posted on the roof tops to kill any escaping samurai. Because no one liked him, none of Kira's neighbors or his nearby family came to his aid.

(note: The 47 Rōnin are always depicted wearing clothing with a zig-zag pattern on them meant to symbolize eternal fidelity, the faithfulness of night following day.)

Lord Kira was captured and members of his clan were put to the sword. Kira was presented with the same knife which Lord Asano used for his seppuku. Instead of killing himself, he knelt trembling and Oishi was forced to behead him. The Rōnin marched through the snow with Lord Kira's head in a firebucket. People along the path praised the men and offered them food.

"The forty-six retainers without Terasaka Kichiemon arrived at the Sengakuji Temple at 10 o'clock. They placed Kira Kozukenosuke's severed head on the tomb of Asano Takuminokami." Also placed on the tomb is the knife used by Lord Asano in his seppuku ritual. The same knife was used to kill lord Kira. The 46 men then prayed for the soul of Asano to rest in peace.

Gathering all of the money they had left, the Rōnin of Ako begged the Abbot of Sengaku-ji for a proper burial after death. Normally a stern and stoic man, it is said that he had tears in his eyes when he heard their final request. After a months long debate among legal scholars, the Rōnin of Ako were condemned to hara-kiri.

In the 1860s, Lord Redesdale lived in a house within sight of Sengaku-ji where the 47 Rōnin were buried. Impressed by the loyalty displayed by the rōnin, he toured Sengaku-ji and finding tattered and yellowed letters amongst the relics, he translated them for his book "Tales of Old Japan." Each of the rōnin carried letters spelling out their intentions in case they were captured or killed. Also translated were the receipt provided by the relatives of Lord Kira for the return of his severed head and the final statement placed by the men on Lord Asano's tomb before surrendering for court martial.

Each of the men were aware of the seriousness of their actions. Onodera Junai would state in a letter to his wife in Kyoto:

"... Even if my dead body is shown, I think my duty will be fulfilled because my dead body will demonstrate Samurai loyalty to the entire country and it will strengthen their resolve."

In John Allyn's book, "The 47 Ronin Story", the leader of the 47 Rōnin Oishi Kuranosuke is quoted as saying:

Some people live all their lives without knowing which path is right. They're buffeted by this wind or that and never really know where they're going. That's largely the fate of the commoners—those who have no choice over their destiny. For those of us born as samurai, life is something else. We know the path of duty and we follow it without question.

"Sengakuji Temple (Resting Place of the 47 Ronin)"

- Uncommon Valor: On December 14, 2002, More than 130,000 people gathered at Sengaku-ji to commemorate the 300th anniversary of the attack on Lord Kira's Mansion by the warriors of Ako.

Celebrating Uchiri (Day of the raid)

== List of samurai literature ==
Examples of important Japanese literature related to samurai and bushido from the 13th to the 21st century:

Author	English title	Japanese title	Date
Hōjō Shigetoki	The Message of Master Gokurakuji		1198–1261
Ogasawara Sakuun	Shoke no Hyōjō		1621
Shiba Yoshimasa	The Chikubashō		1350–1410
Imagawa Sadayo	The Regulations of Imagawa Ryoshun		1325–1420
Asakura Toshikage	The Seventeen-Article Injunction of Asakura Toshikage		1428–1481
Hōjō Sōun	The Twenty-One Precepts Of Hōjō Sōun		1432–1519
Asakura Norikage	The Recorded Words Of Asakura Soteki		1474–1555
Takeda Shingen	The Iwamizudera Monogatari		1521–1573
Takeda Nobushige	Opinions In Ninety-Nine Articles		1525–1561
Torii Mototada	The Last Statement of Torii Mototada		1539–1600
Nabeshima Naoshige	Lord Nabeshima's Wall Inscriptions		1538–1618
Katō Kiyomasa	The Precepts of Kato Kiyomasa		1562–1611
Kōsaka Masanobu	Kōyō Gunkan	甲陽軍鑑	1616
Kuroda Nagamasa	Notes On Regulations		1568–1623
Saitō Chikamori	Kashoki	可笑記	1642
Miyamoto Musashi	The Book of Five Rings	五輪書	1645
Hishikawa Moronobu	Kokon Bushido Ezukushi (Bushido Through The Ages)	古今武士道絵つくし	1685
Yamamoto Tsunetomo and Tsuramoto Tashiro	Hagakure	葉隠	1716
Taira Shigesuke, Daidōji Yūzan	Bushido Shoshinshu	武道初心集	Before 1730
Takashi Araya	To those who Fight: Japan's Cause and Bushido	戦う者たちへ (日本の大義と武士道)	2015
