= Khlit the Cossack =

Fictional character

Khlit the Cossack is a literary character created by Harold Lamb for Adventure between 1917 and 1926.

A wandering Cossack hero, Khlit defies conventional stereotypes: he is not a lover, he is not youthful or flamboyant. An excellent horseman, he is also a fine swordsman, with a fine sword (the sword itself has an interesting past, which Khlit only discovers as the series progresses), but he isn't flashy. He is gruff and moody, but no anti-hero swathed in shades of gray--he protects the innocent when it is in his power to do so. He is a firm believer in swift, sharp justice and devout in his faith, though not given to prayer or religious musings. It is his keen wit that allows him to survive through countless treacheries and intrigues.

Some American researchers call Khlit a "hero of Odyssean wit". He always gets into a seemingly hopeless situation, from which he manages to get out, after all, being a step away from death. Khlit's adventures unfold not only in Ukraine, but far beyond. Traveling across Asia the old Cossack encounters the empire of Assassins, finds the grave of Genghis Khan and the treasures of St. John the Baptist, beats the Chinese army, heads the united Tatar horde, becomes a khagan (imperial title), saddles the elephant in India, saves Afghanistan from a new conquest, etc.

Harold Lamb wrote one short story and 18 novellas about Khlit. A number of the Khlit tales were collected in two books: The Curved Saber (Doubleday 1964) and The Mighty Manslayer (Doubleday 1969). More recently University of Nebraska Press reprinted all of Lamb's Khlit tales in a four-volume series entitled Wolf of the Steppes, Warriors of the Steppes, Riders of the Steppes and Swords of the Steppes.

List of stories published in Adventure:

- "Khlit" (1917)
- "Wolf's War" (1918)
- "Tal Taulai Khan" (1918)
- "Alamut" (1918)
- "The Mighty Manslayer" (1918)
- "The White Khan" (1918)
- "Changa Nor" (1919)
- "Roof of the World" (1919)
- "The Star of Evil Omen" (1919)
- "The Rider of the Gray Horse" (1919)
- "The Lion Cub" (1920)
- "Law of Fire" (1920)
- "The Bride of Jagannath" (1920)
- "The Masterpiece of Death" (1920)
- "The Curved Sword" (1920)
- "Bogatyr" (1925)
- "White Falcon" (1925)
- "The Winged Rider" (1926)
- "The Wolf Master" (1926)
