= Thrilling Adventures =

US magazine

- Categories: Pulp magazine
- Frequency: Monthly
- Founder: Leo Margulies
- Founded: 1931
- First issue: December 1931
- Final issue: November 1943
- Country: United States
- Language: English

Thrilling Adventures was a monthly American pulp magazine published from 1931 to 1943.

== History ==
Thrilling Adventures was created in 1931 by editor Leo Margulies and was patterned after the pulp Adventure. It was one of 16 pulps that Margulies founded that incorporated the adjective "Thrilling" in the title. (The company that published the Thrilling titles eventually changed its name to Thrilling Publications.) The first edition of Thrilling Adventures was published in December 1931.

Thrilling Adventures published fictional stories, mostly of the adventure and sports genres. Edgar Rice Burroughs published both Tarzan stories and westerns in Thrilling Adventures. Louis L'Amour and Allan R. Bosworth contributed sports stories to Thrilling Adventures. Robert E. Howard published two Afghanistan-set stories in Thrilling Adventures (one posthumously). For the magazine, Malcolm Wheeler-Nicholson wrote historical stories about Alan de Beaufort, a Crusader who joins the armies of Genghis Khan, in a similar style to Harold Lamb. Perley Poore Sheehan contributed two series to Thrilling Adventures, Captain Trouble, an American adventuring in the Far East, and (under the pseudonym Paul Regard) Kwa of the Jungle, a Tarzan imitation. Carl Jacobi had his adventure stories set in Borneo and Balochistan published in Thrilling Adventures. Other contributors to the magazine included L. Ron Hubbard, Johnston McCulley, Jack D'Arcy, Kenneth Gilbert, Donald Bayne Hobart, Arthur J. Burks, George Fielding Eliot, Henry Kuttner, Jim Kjelgaard and Manly Wade Wellman. The magazine also published material under several house names including Jackson Cole, Kerry McRoberts, and Scott Morgan. It continued as a monthly until 1943 when it was reduced to a bimonthly, and the final issue was the November 1943 edition. A total of 139 issues were published during its existence.

== Anthologies ==
- The Best of Thrilling Adventures 1933-35 (Introduction by Will Murray). Altus Press, 2017.
