= Harold Lamb =

American writer (1892–1962)

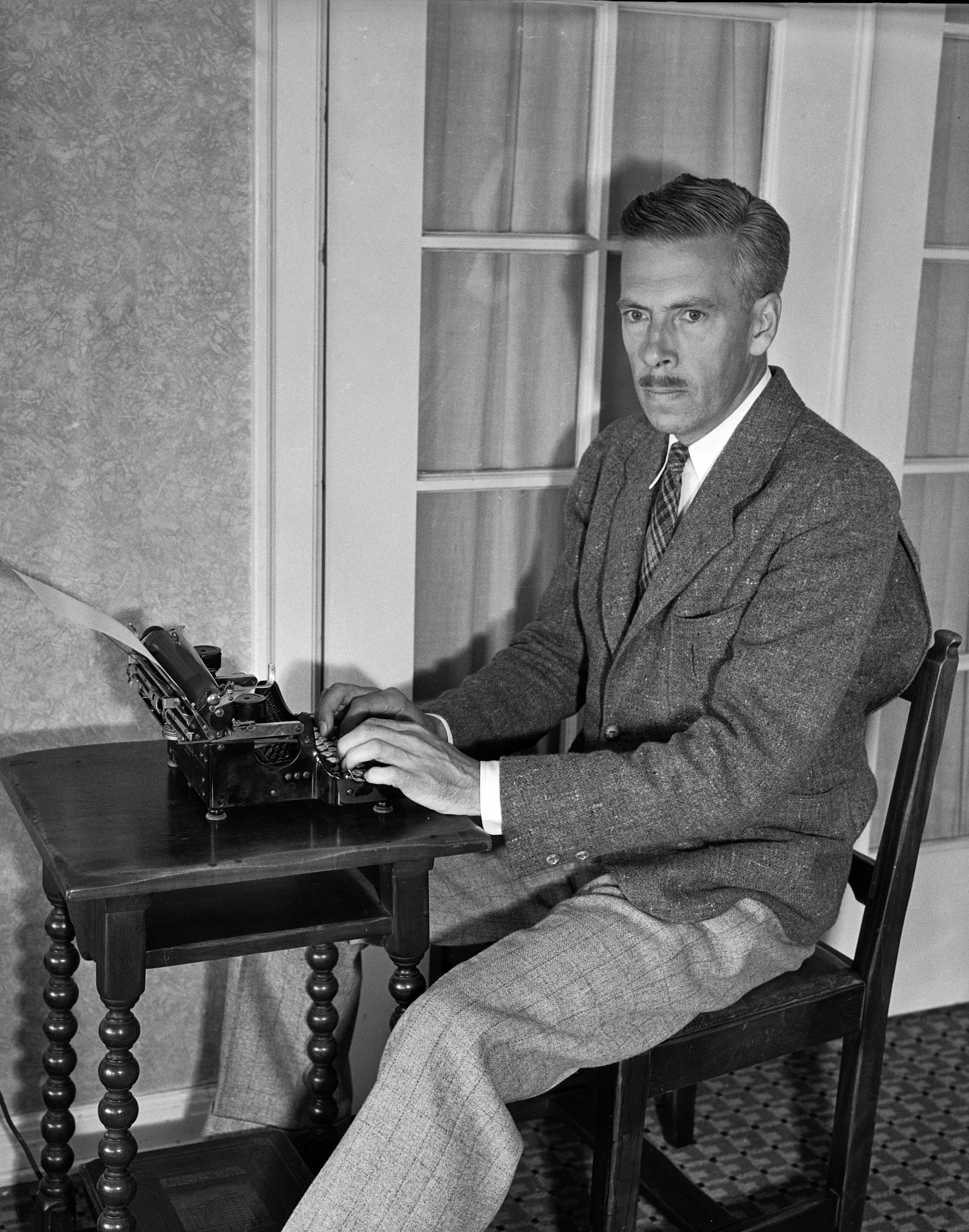
- Lamb in 1935
- Born: Harold Albert Lamb; September 1, 1892; Alpine, New Jersey, U.S.
- Died: April 9, 1962 (aged 69); Rochester, Minnesota, U.S.
- Education: Columbia University
- Occupations: Writer; novelist; screenwriter; historian
- Writing career
- Pen name: H. A. Lamb
- Notable awards: Guggenheim Fellowship (1929)
- Website: www.haroldlamb.com

Harold Albert Lamb (September 1, 1892 – April 9, 1962) was an American writer, novelist, historian, and screenwriter. In both his fiction and nonfiction work, Lamb gravitated toward subjects related to Asia and the Middle East.

Lamb was an advocate of inclusive literature and history, saying to The New York Times in 1953, "It all came out as an intense irritation over the fact that all history seemed to draw a north-south line across Europe, through Berlin and Venice, say. Everything was supposed to have happened west of that line, nothing to the East. Ridiculous of course."

== Early life ==
Lamb was born September 1, 1892, in Alpine, New Jersey. His mother was Eliza Rollinson, and his father was Frederick Lamb, a mural painter who designed stained glass. His paternal grandfather was an artist who started J. & R. Lamb Studios, a company that made stained glass.

He was shy with impaired hearing, sight, and speech as a child, attending the Friend's Seminary in New York City, but declaring that he had not enjoyed the experience. He preferred reading historical epics in his grandfather's library. He grew to 6 feet 1 inch (185 cm) tall, with premature grey hair.

In 1914, he attended Columbia University, where his interest in the peoples and history of Asia began. His professors at Columbia included Carl Van Doren and John Erskine. While there, he played on the soccer and tennis teams. He joined the literary fraternity of Delta Psi (St. Anthony Hall), and was on the editorial board of Columbia Monthly, the university's literary magazine. However, Lamb almost flunked out of Columbia because he skipped many classes, spending much time instead reading for pleasure at the library. He failed a history class. Although he graduated with an A.B. in 1916, he claimed it was only because he received Columbia University's H.C. Bunner medal in American literature in 1914.

== Career ==
Lamb built a career with his writing from an early age. He began writing for pulp magazines, writing stories about the mountains of Afghanistan and the Russian steppes. In 1917, he began writing for Adventure magazine, his primary fiction outlet for 19 years, with some 58 stories being published. However, his stories were also published by Argosy, All-Story, Asia magazine, Collier's, Short Stories, and The Saturday Evening Post.

In 1927 he wrote a biography of Genghis Khan, and following its success turned more and more to the writing of non-fiction, penning numerous biographies and popular history books. He also wrote articles for National Geographic and the San Francisco Chronicle.

The success of Lamb's two-volume history of the Crusades led to his discovery by Cecil B. DeMille, who employed Lamb as a technical advisor on a related movie, The Crusades. He was also a screenwriter on many other DeMille movies, including The Buccaneer, The Golden Horde, The Plainsman and Samson and Delilah.

=== Fiction ===
Although Harold Lamb wrote short stories for a variety of magazines between 1917 and the early 1960s and wrote several novels, his best-known and most reprinted fiction is that which he wrote for Adventure between 1917 and 1936. The editor of Adventure, Arthur Sullivant Hoffman, praised Lamb's writing ability, describing him as "always the scholar first, the good fictionist second". The majority of Harold Lamb's work for Adventure was historical fiction, and his stories can be thematically divided into three categories — those featuring Cossacks, Crusaders, or Asian/Middle-Eastern Protagonists.

Lamb's stories were well-researched and rooted in their time, often featuring real historical characters, but set in places unfamiliar and exotic to most of the western audience reading his fiction. While his adventure stories had familiar tropes such as tyrannical rulers and scheming priests, he avoided the simplistic depiction of foreign or unfamiliar cultures as evil; many of his heroes were Mongolian, Indian, Russian, or Muslim. Most of his protagonists were outsiders or outcasts apart from civilization, and all but a very few were skilled swordsmen and warriors.

In a Lamb story, honor and loyalty to one's comrades-in-arms were more important than cultural identity, although often his protagonists ended up risking their lives to protect the cultures that had spurned them. Those holding positions of authority are almost universally depicted as being corrupted by their power or consumed with greed, be they Russian boyars or Buddhist priests, and merchants are almost always shown as placing their desire for coin above the well-being of their fellow men. Loyalty, wisdom, and religious piety is shown again and again in these stories to lie more securely in the hands of Lamb's common folk.

While his stories are not bereft of the "damsel in distress" trope, Lamb typically depicted his female characters as courageous, independent, and more shrewd than their male counterparts. Their motives and true loyalties, though, remained mysterious to Lamb's male characters, and their unknowable nature is frequently the source of plot tension.

Lamb was never a formula plotter, and his stories often turned upon surprising developments arising from character conflict. The bulk of his Crusader, Asian, and Middle-Eastern stories (as well as the latter stories of Khlit the Cossack) were written in the latter portion of his pulp magazine years, and demonstrate a growing command of prose tools, with the more frequent use, for example, of poetic metaphor in his description.

==== Cossack tales ====
By far the largest number of these tales were short stories, novellas, and novels of Cossacks wandering the Asian steppes during the late 16th and early 17th century, all but a half-dozen featuring a set of allied characters. Two early books (Kirdy and White Falcon) reprinted the longest of these Cossack adventures, and two later books (The Curved Saber and The Mighty Manslayer) reprinted 14 of the short stories; the four large Steppes volumes published by the University of Nebraska Press present all of Lamb's Cossack tales in chronological order.

The most famous of these Cossack characters is Khlit, a grey-bearded veteran who survives as often by his wiles as his sword arm; he is a featured character in 18 of the Cossack adventures and appears in another. He chooses to wander Asia rather than face forced "Cossack retirement" in a Russian monastery and launches into an odyssey that takes him to Mongolia, China, and Afghanistan. He comes to befriend and rely upon folk he has been raised to despise and briefly rises to leadership of a Tartar tribe before wandering further south. His greatest friend proves to be the swashbuckling swordsman, Abdul Dost, whom he aids in raising a rebellion against the Mughal emperor in Afghanistan. In later stories, Khlit returns as a secondary character, an aged advisor to his adventurous grandson, Kirdy, and other Cossack heroes featured in separate stories.

==== Crusader tales ====
Unlike Lamb's Cossack stories, only a handful of his Crusader stories are interrelated. Two novelettes feature the young knight, Nial O'Gordon, and three short novels are centered around Sir Hugh of Taranto, who rediscovers the sword of Roland, Durandal. Durandal, published in 1931, reprinted all three novels of Sir Hugh with new linking material. Grant Books' Durandal and The Sea of Ravens each reprint a single of these three novels.

While Lamb's Crusaders sometimes battle against their traditional Muslim foes, the majority of these tales feature forays into deeper Asia. All of Lamb's Crusader stories have been collected in the 2009 Bison volume Swords from the West, except for Durandal, The Sea of Ravens and the announced Rusudan, all from Donald M. Grant Co. Related stories with occasional Crusaders are collected in Swords from the Desert (Bison, 2009).

==== Asian and Middle-Eastern tales ====
Lamb also wrote a biographical fiction of the Persian king Cyrus the Great, the founder of the Achaemenid Empire.

He wrote a variety of stories featuring or narrated by Muslim, Mongol, or Chinese protagonists, set for the most part during the late 16th and early 17th centuries. "The Three Paladins" is a story of young Genghis Khan, told mostly from the viewpoint of one of his boyhood comrades, a Chinese prince.

==== Other ====
Lamb produced several stories of naval warfare with a historical setting. These included several fictions revolving around John Paul Jones in eighteenth-century Russia. He also wrote several novels which were almost like dramatized biographies; he did not invent much beyond known history.

Lamb produced several fantasy novels featuring lost worlds. These included Marching Sands, about a lost city of Crusaders in the Gobi Desert. A Garden to the Eastward features a hidden tribe living in an extinct volcano in Kurdistan.

== Awards ==
- In 1914, Lamb received the H.C. Bunner medal in American literature.
- Lamb received a Guggenheim Fellowship to study medieval history at the Vatican Library in Rome for a year, starting on April 1, 1929.

== Reception and influence ==
Robert E. Howard described Lamb as one of his "favorite writers". Cecelia Holland has described Lamb as "a master of pace [who] had a gift also for the quick glimpse of a landscape that throws everything into perspective", and has praised Lamb's plotting and action writing.

Writers acknowledging the influence of Lamb's work include: Ben Bova, Thomas B. Costain, Gardner Fox, Harry Harrison, Robert E. Howard, Howard Andrew Jones, Scott Oden, Norvell Page, and Malcolm Wheeler-Nicholson.

== Personal life ==
During World War I in May 1917, he served as a private in the Seventh New York regiment (K Company). However, his unit did not see any action.

He married Ruth Lemont Barbour (d. 1986) on June 14, 1917. They moved to Beverly Hills, California for his father's health. Their children include a daughter, Cary Lamb (d. 1985), and a son, Frederick Stymetz Lamb.

Once he began earning money, he traveled to Europe, India, Persia (Iran), and Russia. He claimed to have traveled 59,000 miles in the Middle East.

Lamb served with the Office of Strategic Services in Iran during World War II. This was the forerunner to the Central Intelligence Agency. Later, he was an informal adviser to the United States Department of State. He was also the director of the American Friends of the Middle East. He spoke French, Latin, Persian, Arabic and a smattering of Manchu-Tartar. The Persian government gave him a medal for scientific research in 1932. In 1933, the Commonwealth Club of San Francisco gave him a silver medal.

On April 9, 1962, Lamb died at the Mayo Clinic in Rochester, Minnesota, at the age of 69.

== Publications ==
=== Novels ===
- Marching Sands. New York: D. Appleton and Company, 1920
- The House of the Falcon New York: D. Appleton and Company, 1921
- White Falcon. New York: McBride, 1926
- Nur Mahal. Garden City: Doubleday & Company, 1932
- Omar Khayyam New York: Doubleday & Company, 1934
- A Garden to the Eastward Garden City: Doubleday & Company, 1947
- The Curved Saber: The Adventures of Khlit the Cossack. Garden City: Doubleday & Company, 1964
- The Mighty Manslayer. New York: Doubleday & Company, 1969
- The Three Palladins. Donald M. Grant, Publisher, Inc., 1977. ISBN 978-0937986295
- Durandal. Donald m Grant Pub Inc., 1981. ISBN 9780937986455
- The Sea of the Ravens. Donald M. Grant Publisher, 1983. ISBN 978-0937986585
- The Skull of Shirzad Mir. Black Dog Books, 2006. ISBN 978-1928619413
- Wolf of the Steppes. Lincoln, NE: Bison Books, 2006. ISBN 978-0803280489
- Warriors of the Steppes. Lincoln, Nebraska: Bison Books, 2006. ISBN 978-0803280496
- Riders of the Steppes. Lincoln, Nebraska: Bison Books, 2007. ISBN 9780803280502
- Swords of the Steppes: The Complete Cossack Adventures. (4 volumes). Lincoln, Nebraska:: Bison Books, 2007. ISBN 978-0803280519
- Swords from the West. Lincoln, Nebraska: Bison Books, 2009. ISBN 978-0803220355
- Swords from the Desert. Lincoln, Nebraska: Bison Books, 2009. ISBN 978-0-8032-2516-9
- Swords from the East. Lincoln, Nebraska: Bison Books, 2010. ISBN 978-0803229723
- Swords from the Sea. Lincoln, Nebraska: Bison Books, 2010. ISBN 978-0803220362
- Marching Sands and The Caravan of the Dead: The Harold Lamb Omnibus. Steeger Books, 2019. ISBN 978-1618274441

=== Novelette and novella ===
- "Somewhere in the Pacific." All-Story, vol 70.(April 28, 1917) pp. 391-404.
- "Alamut." Adventure, August 3, 1918.
- Call of the Caribbean, 1919.
- "Rose Face," Adventure (March 1, 1920) pp. 118–131.
- "Forward" Adventure (October 10, 1924), pp. 1-33.
- "The Making of the Morning Star" Adventure (April 10, 1924) pp. 3–72.
- "The Witch of Aleppo." Adventure, vol 44 (30 January 30, 1924) pp. 1-69.
- "The Grand Cham" Adventure ( July 3, 1921) pp. 111–174
- "The Camp of the Snake." Short Stories, vol 104 (June 10, 1924) pp. 113–1140
- "The Snow Driver." Adventure (March 20, 1925) pp. 1–61.
- "The Wolf Master." Adventure (December 8, 1926) pp. 2–81.

=== Children's fiction ===
- "Durandal." Adventure (September 23, 1926)
- Kirdy The Road out of the World. New York: Junior Literary Guild, 1933

=== Short stories ===
- "Channa's Tabu," All-Story Weekly (January 25, 1919)
- "Profit," Argosy and Railroad Man's Magazine. 107 (May 3, 1919): 510–516.
- "A Chinaman's Chance," Argosy and Railroad Man's Magazine. 108 (May 24, 1919): 253–263.
- "Said Afzel's Elephant" Adventure (December 1, 1919)
- "Ships and Sharks" All-Story Weekly (December 20, 1919)
- "The Jumping-Off Place" Argosy All-Story Weekly (April 16, 1921)
- "The Gate in the Sky," Adventure (February 20, 1922): 144–149.
- "The Voice in the Drum" Short Stories (January 25, 1923): 74–87.
- "The King Dies" Adventure (September 1, 1923)
- "The Devil's Bungalow," Short Stories (January 25, 1924)
- "Mr. Three," Short Stories (February 10, 1924)
- "The Buffalo Bear," Short Stories (November 10, 1924)
- "The Sword of Honor" Adventure (November 20, 1924)
- :"Bogatyr" Adventure (September 30, 1925)
- "The Mark of Astrakhan," Adventure (November 20, 1925)
- "The White Falcon" Adventure (November 30, 1925)
- "The Winged Rider" Adventure (January 10, 1926)
- "The Ghost of Los Cordas," The Corner Magazine (March 1926)
- "The Book of the Tiger: The Warrior" Adventure, June 23, 1926
- "The Book of the Tiger: The Emperor" Adventure (July 8, 1926)
- "The Shield" Adventure (August 8, 1926)
- "The Sea of the Ravens" Adventure (January 15, 1927)
- "Rusudan," Adventure (May 1, 1927)
- "Flame Weapons," Adventure (July 15, 1927)
- "The Guest of Karadak," Adventure (August 15, 1927)
- "The Road to Kandahar," Adventure (November 15, 1927)

=== Biographies ===
- Genghis Khan: The Emperor of All Men. New York, Robert M. McBride, 1927
- Tamerlane: The Earth Shaker Thornton Butterworth Ltd.,1928
- Alexander of Macedon: The Journey to World's End Garden City: Doubleday & Company, 1946
- Suleiman the Magnificent. Garden City: Doubleday & Company, 1951
- Theodora and the Emperor: The Drama of Justinian. Garden City: Doubleday & Company, 1952
- Charlemagne: The Legend and the Man. Garden City: Doubleday & Company, 1954.
- Hannibal: One Man Against Rome. Garden City: Doubleday & Company, 1958
- Cyrus the Great. Garden City: Doubleday & Company,1960
- Babur the Tiger: First of the Mughals. Toledo: Discover Books, 1961

=== Non-fiction ===
- The Crusades, vol. 1: Iron Men and Saints Garden City: Garden City Publishing, 1930
- The Crusades, vol. 2: The Flame of Islam Garden City: Garden City Publishing, 1930
- The March of the Barbarians. Literary Guild of America, 1940
- The March of Muscovy: Ivan the Terrible and the Growth of the Russian Empire, 1400-1648. Garden City: Doubleday & Company, 1948
- The City and the Tsar: Peter the Great and the Move to the West, 1648-1762. Garden City: Doubleday & Company, 1948
- The Earth Shakers. Garden City: Doubleday & Company, 1949
- New Found World: How North America Was Discovered and Explored. Garden City: Doubleday & Company,1955
- Constantinople: Birth of an Empire. New York: Alfred A. Knopf, 1957

=== Children's nonfiction ===
- Genghis Khan and the Mongol Horde. New York: Random House, 1954. ISBN 978-0394805122
- Chief of the Cossacks. New York: Random House, 1959.

=== Film ===
- The Crusades (1935)
- The Plainsman (1936)
- The Buccaneer (Paramount, 1938)
- Samson and Delilah (1949).
- The Golden Horde (1951)
- The Buccaneer (1958)
