= Top-Notch Magazine =

Former American pulp magazine

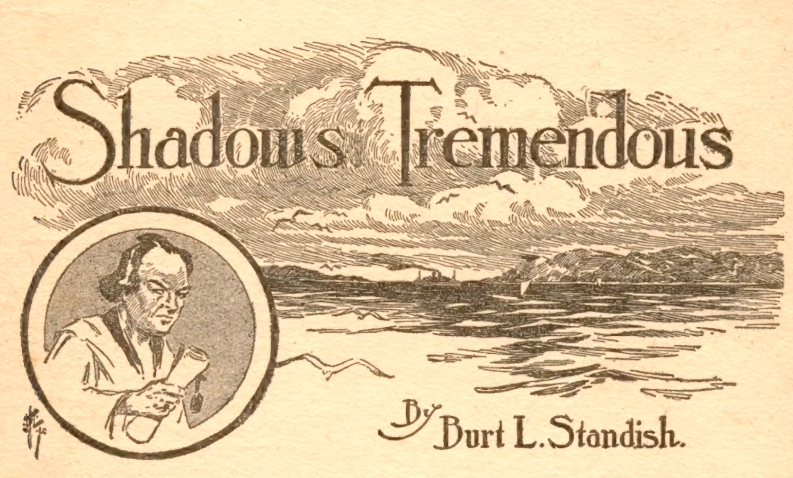

Top-Notch Magazine was an American pulp magazine of adventure fiction published between 1910 and 1937 by Street & Smith in New York City.

== History and profile ==
Top-Notch Magazine was first published in March 1910. Issued twice-monthly, it published 602 editions until it ceased in October 1937. For most of its history, the cover price was 10 cents. It began as a magazine for teenagers and even as a pulp concentrated mostly on sports stories, switching to a men's adventure magazine in the 1930s. Notable contributors to Top-Notch Magazine included Jack London, F. Britten Austin, William Wallace Cook, Bertram Atkey, and Johnston McCulley in the early days; and later Robert E. Howard, L. Ron Hubbard, Lester Dent, Carl Jacobi, Burt L. Standish, J. Allan Dunn, and Harry Stephen Keeler.
