= InterWorld (series) =

2007-2015 Science Fantasy Book Series By Neil Gaiman

- InterWorld; The Silver Dream; Eternity's Wheel
- Author: Neil Gaiman; Michael Reaves; Mallory Reaves (2&3)
- Language: English
- Genre: Fantasy; Science fiction Science fantasy
- Publisher: EOS and HarperTeen, imprints of HarperCollins Publishers
- No. of books: 3

InterWorld is a trilogy of fantasy and science fiction novels written by Neil Gaiman, Michael Reaves and later Mallory Reaves. The books are published by EOS and HarperTeen, imprints of HarperCollins Publishers.

== Novels ==
=== InterWorld ===
Joey Harker is a very average kid who discovers that his world is only one of an infinite alternate Earths. Some of these Earths were ruled by magic, some by science, but all were at war.

Joey teams up with alternate versions of himself from an array of these worlds. Together, the army of Joeys battle evil magicians Lord Dogknife and Lady Indigo from HEX and 01101 from Binary to keep the balance of power between all the earths stable.

=== The Silver Dream ===
In this novel, Joey continues to struggle to find his place within the InterWorld organization, as he is still blamed for the death of a popular team member. As the team begins to lose more and more ground to Hex and Binary, Joey encounters a mysterious young woman named Acacia Jones, whose powers to jump between dimensions seem to rival or even exceed his own and who may not be working for the same ends that he is.

=== Eternity's Wheel ===
In his final adventure, Joey Harker is forced to be a leader as he had to step up to face the ultimate enemy who was the mastermind behind HEX and Binary if he has any hope of saving InterWorld, the multiverse, and everything in between.

== Setting ==
=== Altiverse ===
The novels are set in the Altiverse, a 'portion' in the multiverse composed of a trillion alternate Earths. Whenever consciousness, not to be mixed with ego, has to make an important decision, the universe branches off in two directions.

The Altiverse is conceptualized as an arc. At one end science reigns, while at the other magic reigns. The reality Joey comes from, which is based on the real world, lies near the center a bit to the science side. The Altiverse has 3 factions fighting an eternal war. Science's region is mostly dominated by Binary ('01101'b). HEX is the magical cabal that controls several of the Magical regions. InterWorld is a guerrilla-like organization that fights to keep the other two groups from dominating the arc, while trying to maintain balance between magic and science.

Besides parallel worlds the Altiverse has bizarre zones named Nowhere-at-all, Static and In-Between. They serve as the inter-plane bridge. The Nowhere-at-all is filled with Magic, while the Static has Science. Traveling from world to world takes weeks or days, except through the In-Between, but only Walkers can go there. The In-Between is also the place where strange multidimensional beings dwell. In any case, these zones aren't really understood.

=== Walkers ===
Walkers are special people which possess the gift of "walk" through realities. The only known Walkers are Joseph Harker and all of his alternate counterparts.

== Characters ==
=== InterWorld ===
- Joseph "Joey" Harker: The main hero of the series. He is a 16-year-old student who discovered the ability to "walk" between realities/dimensions.
- Hue: A "mudluff" (MDLF, short for "Multi-Dimensional Life-Form") that resembles a soap bubble. It becomes attached to Joey saves him from a monster in the In-between .
- Jay Harker: An older version of Joey from an alternate universe. He is very professional agent of InterWorld who was killed trying to protect Joey from a giant Mudluff. His dying recommendation leads to Joey joining InterWorld.
- Joe Harker / The Old Man: The oldest Joey in InterWorld, possibly the first. He has an artificial eye, which is a Binary construct of metal and glass. It may have many powers the reader is unaware of.
- Josetta Harker: The Old Man's assistant.
- Jai Harker: An Indian who came from Earth where India had beaten the British and discovered America first. He possess psychokinetic abilities (meaning he can create objects from his inner power i.e. his Chi).
- Jo Harker: One of the only two girls on Joey's team. She comes from a magic world that is eventually taken over by HEX. She has two Angel-like wings but can only fly when there is enough magic in the air.
- Josef Hokun: A Walker from an Earth that is much denser, therefore he possess a greater gravitational field and is built like a tank with feet.
- J/O HrKr: The youngest of all the Joeys. He always scans everyone for any hit at his age. He comes from a future earth that is not yet a Binary satellite. A baby born there is injected with nanobots. As a result, he possess lasers, detailed files of sword fighting, light sensitive eyes and has metal skin (therefore calls everyone "Fleshface").
- Jakon Harrkanen: A real practical joker and the way she is described is "what might happen if there was a wolf in the family tree thirty thousand years back". She has superhuman smell, reflexes, sight and speed.
- Jerzy Harker: First friend to Joseph Harker in Interworld, he later dies when Joaquim causes a rock slide during a training exercise.

=== Timewatch ===
- Acacia Jones: An agent for the organisation Timewatch, she has the ability to travel in time.
- Avery Jones: Acacia's younger brother.

=== HEX ===
- Lord Dogknife: The leader of HEX.
- Lady Indigo: The second in command of HEX.
- Scarabus: A heavily tattooed man that can become anything by touching a specific picture on his body.
- Neville: A man with translucent skin and the marks of his nerves and bones appeared on his skin.

=== Binary ===
- 01101 / The Professor: An artificial intelligence who acts as the leader of the Binary.
- Joaquim Harker: A "cloned Walker" who infiltrated InterWorld.

=== Other characters ===
- Jack Dimas: A school teacher who later becomes aware of Joseph's journey in the final novel.
- Rowena Danvers: One of Joseph's schoolmates and his love interest.
- Edward "Ted" Russell: Another of Joseph's schoolmates.

== In other media ==
The idea of InterWorld surged on 1995, when Reeves was developing an animated series for DreamWorks while Gaiman was in London, working in the television series Neverwhere. Originally being an idea for a possible television series, InterWorld ended up being a novel that was not shown until 2007.

In June 2007, Neil Gaiman reported in his journal that DreamWorks Animation optioned the book to make it into an animated feature film.

In June 2016, the previous plans to make InterWorld a television series were revived by Universal Cable Productions, in association with Hamilton producer Jeffrey Seller and his partner Flody Suarez.
