= Alien: Rogue Incursion =

- Developer: Survios
- Publisher: Survios
- Director: Eugene Elkin
- Producer: Margherita Seconnino
- Designer: Patrick Harris
- Programmer: Eugene Elkin
- Artist: Dave Smith
- Writers: Zoë Quinn; Alex White
- Composer: Sara Barone
- Series: Alien
- Engine: Unreal Engine 5
- Platforms: PlayStation 5; Meta Quest 3; Windows; Xbox Series X/S; Nintendo Switch 2
- Release: PS5, Windows; December 19, 2024; Quest 3 February 13, 2025; Evolved Edition; PlayStation 5, Xbox Series X/S: WW: September 30, 2025; Nintendo Switch 2: WW: April 21, 2026
- Genres: Action, survival horror
- Mode: Single-player

Alien: Rogue Incursion is a virtual reality game developed and published by Survios. It is based on the Alien franchise, taking place between the films Alien and Aliens. An action and survival horror game, it follows Zula Hendricks, a character from several Alien comics and novels, as she navigates a facility overrun by xenomorphs.

Announced in 2022, the game was written by Alien novel writer Alex White. It was published for the PlayStation 5 (via the PS VR2) and Windows on December 19, 2024, for Meta Quest 3 on February 13, 2025. A non-VR version of the game, titled Evolved Edition, was released for Windows, Xbox Series X/S and PlayStation 5 on September 30, 2025, and for Nintendo Switch 2 on April 21, 2026. It includes changes to the controls, camera angles, and pacing.

Alien: Rogue Incursion received generally favorable reviews. It was praised for capturing the atmosphere of the films, although some critics found the gameplay repetitive. Alien: Rogue Incursion is the first of a two-part story, with a second game in development as of December 2024.

== Gameplay ==
Alien: Rogue Incursion is an action and survival horror game, set between the films Alien and Aliens. Zula Hendricks, a former Marine, has set out to stop the weaponization of xenomorphs. She receives a distress call from a friend who is on the planet Purdan, also known as LV-354. She travels there with her android companion, Davis 01. Arriving at the Gemini Exoplanet Solutions facility, they find it overrun by xenomorphs and devoid of human life. The player assumes the role of Zula and must proceed through the facility, while killing or avoiding the xenomorphs, which can crawl on walls and leap great distances. Facehuggers, an early stage of the xenomorph, are also encountered.

The game is played from a first-person perspective. A motion tracker alerts the player of nearby xenomorphs, and stealth can be used to evade them. Environmental elements, such as creaky doors and trash cans, create noise if touched, potentially attracting the xenomorphs. The player can also run and dodge attacks. Three weapons are available: a pulse rifle, a shotgun, and a revolver. Proximity grenades can also be used. Resources, including ammunition, are scarce. Panic rooms are found throughout the facility, serving as save points. Occasionally, the player must complete puzzles to unlock doors or terminals, the latter providing access to worker emails and video logs.

== Plot ==
=== Part One ===
AWOL Marine Zula Hendricks and her android partner Davis head for the settlement Castor's Cradle on the planet Purdan, following the summons of one of Zula's old friends, Benjamin Carver. However, as they approach Castor's Cradle, they are suddenly attacked by anti-aircraft fire and their ship is shot down. As she surveys the damage to the ship, Zula plays a recording left behind by Carver who warns her that his current employer, Gemini Exoplanet Solutions (GES), needs to be exposed for their crimes. While Davis stays behind to repair the ship, Zula explores Castor's Cradle and is dismayed to find it infested with Xenomorphs.

As Zula and Davis explore the facility, they are eventually attacked and overwhelmed by the Xenomorphs. Zula is captured and impregnated by a Facehugger while Davis is critically damaged, forcing Zula to detach his head and upload his mind into her terminal. With little time before the Xenomorph embryo inside her emerges from her chest and kills her, Zula is determined to expose whatever GES is hiding in Castor's Cradle. They resolve to undo the communications blackout that has cut off the base from the outside world, and determine that it was caused by a saboteur, who is also likely responsible for the Xenomorph infestation. After lifting the communications blackout and sending a message to Amanda Ripley warning her about GES, Zula decides to destroy Castor's Cradle by overloading her ship's reactor. However, before they can overload the reactor, it is shut down by one of the facility's androids, Helen, who explains she was directed to shut down the reactor and prepare a special medpod to remove the Xenomorph embryo from Zula's body.

Despite being suspicious about Helen's sudden intervention, Zula is eventually convinced by Davis to go through the procedure. The procedure successfully removes the Xenomorph inside Zula although the embryo itself is somehow deceased, but Helen is destroyed when a Praetorian attacks her. Zula is able to kill the Xenomorph and is then contacted by Carver, who has holed up with other survivors in one of the facility's secret sublevels. Zula takes a secret elevator to the sublevels to meet Carver, but is attacked by a synthetic.

== Development and release ==
Alien: Rogue Incursion was developed by Survios with Unreal Engine 5. The game was announced in July 2022, and the title was unveiled in April 2024.

Survios had ventured into film-based VR games in recent years and tasked TQ Jefferson, the company's chief product officer, with finding its next project. Previously an executive for 20th Century Games, Jefferson had worked with developers on Aliens: Fireteam Elite (2021) and Aliens: Dark Descent (2023). He recalled later: "I dreamt about the kind of Alien game I would make if I could. As a fan, it had to be authentic to the film franchise, and I wanted people to feel immersed in the Alien world. Fast-forward, I'm at Survios and tasked with finding our next big project. I knew this franchise was perfect for this opportunity." The game was written by Alex White, who previously wrote two Alien novels: Alien: The Cold Forge (2018) and Alien: Into Charybdis (2021).

The 2014 game Alien: Isolation provided some inspiration for Survios, despite its focus on a single xenomorph. According to White, "What I took away from Alien: Isolation is that a strong personal connection to the character makes the franchise run." Whereas Alien: Isolation is compared with the original Alien film, Alien: Rogue Incursion is equated with Aliens because of its many xenomorphs. The action-heavy third act of Aliens was a major source of inspiration for the game developers. The behavior of the game's xenomorphs was largely inspired by the Velociraptors in the 1993 film Jurassic Park. Jefferson described the game's artificial intelligence (A.I.) as, "Dynamically spawning and pathing with countless unique possibilities, even we couldn't tell you exactly where and when each Xenomorph will strike, let alone what strategies it might use or if it'll bring some friends".

The virtual reality format was considered ideal for recreating the atmosphere of the films, and Survios worked closely with Disney and 20th Century Studios to achieve this goal. Survios created its own original story for the game, and also worked with the film studios to avoid contradictions in future media, including the film Alien: Romulus (2024) and the television series Alien: Earth (2025). Purdan is a game-specific location created by Survios. The character Zula Hendricks had previously appeared in several Alien comics and novels. According to Jefferson, she was chosen for the game because "we wanted a character that had some history in the timeline", as well as someone who "is a trained colonial marine and has encountered Xenomorphs before. [...] a badass woman of color". Davis 01 had also made appearances in the comics and novels. Zula and Davis 01 are voiced by Andia Winslow and Robbie Daymond respectively.

A first playable demo was eventually finished, but it was determined to be inadequate, leading to a complete restart on the project. According to Jefferson, "The game looked like Alien but didn't play or feel like Alien. We realized we weren't making what we had envisioned. We were trying to do too much".

The game's music was composed by Sara Barone, a longtime Alien fan. Inspired by the film scores, she made use of various woodwind instruments. She also worked with audio lead Chris Dang to create a music and sound design "that would cause the player to question what they are hearing: is it a Xenomorph lurking nearby or is it just a mechanical sound from the environment?"

Alien: Rogue Incursion was published by Survios for the PlayStation 5 (via the PS VR2), Windows, and Meta Quest 3. The PS5 and Windows versions were released on December 19, 2024, the latter via Steam. The Quest version was originally intended to release at the same time, but was delayed to February 13, 2025, to allow for more fine-tuning. A non-VR version of the game, titled Evolved Edition, was released for Windows, Xbox Series X/S and PlayStation 5 on September 30, 2025. It includes changes to the controls, camera angles, and pacing.

== Reception ==
Reception

Aggregate scores
Aggregator	Score
Metacritic	PS5: 75/100; PC: 80/100
OpenCritic	43% recommend

Review scores
Publication	Score
GameSpot	5/10
IGN	7/10; 8/10
Push Square	7/10
TechRadar	4/5
Android Central	3.5/5
CG Magazine	7/10
Gamereactor	9/10
Multiplayer.it	6/10
Paste	7.1/10
Press Start	8.5/10
Road to VR	7/10
UploadVR	3.5/5

Alien: Rogue Incursion received "generally favorable" reviews according to Metacritic. Shaun Cichacki of Vice called it "a stellar addition" to the Alien franchise and "one of the best VR games I've played in a while." Ossi Mykkänen of Gamereactor wrote that it "isn't just a great VR game; it's one of the best Alien gaming experiences. The world is clearly built with love for Alien mythology". Elijah Gonzalez, writing for Paste, stated that the game begins strong but "is eventually let down by repetition, technical issues, and motion sickness-inducing movement that left me much more nauseous than its body horror did." Don Hopper of UploadVR called it a "commendable yet flawed entry" in the franchise.

Alien: Rogue Incursion was generally praised for capturing the atmosphere of the films. (Note: According to multiple sources:) Aaron Bayne of Push Square wrote that the game sometimes has a generic science fiction look rather than "something ripped straight out of the movies, but when the game gets the aesthetic right it really gets it right." The audio, including the music and voices, also received praise. (Note: According to multiple sources:) Rogue Incursion was nominated in the 15th Hollywood Music in Media Awards for best score in a console and PC game, losing to Delta Force. Bayne commended the game's level of immersion, while Travis Northup of IGN found the arsenal to be "limited and mostly unremarkable". He called the relationship between Zula and Davis 01 "genuinely touching, oftentimes offsetting an otherwise relentlessly bleak situation".

Some critics found the level designs and puzzles repetitious. The A.I. received some criticism as well; Bayne wrote, "The longer you spend with the game the more apparent it becomes that the Alien AI is barebones." Glitches were also noted, including poor collision detection. Hopper wrote that "video memory errors, crashes, and the occasional game-breaking bug plagued an otherwise gripping experience."

Nicholas Sutrich reviewed the Quest 3 version for Android Central, criticizing it for performance problems and low-resolution graphics. However, he noted the release of an upcoming patch to resolve these issues, and otherwise called it "one of the better action-horror games" on the Quest 3. Mark Delaney of GameSpot also found the graphics to be diminished in the Quest 3 version: "Everything looks fuzzier and less nuanced. Characters' faces are mushier. In the right setting, seeing a Xeno's massive head emerge from the darkness may well be petrifying, but on Quest, the mood suffers because the headset just can't oblige."

=== Accolades ===
Year	Award	Category	Result	Ref.
2025	28th Annual D.I.C.E. Awards	Immersive Reality Technical Achievement	Nominated	
2025	28th Annual D.I.C.E. Awards	Immersive Reality Game of the Year	Nominated	
2025	The Game Awards 2025	Best VR/AR Game	Nominated	

== Sequel ==
Alien: Rogue Incursion is the first of a two-part story, with a second game in development as of December 2024.
