= The Cold Forge =

2018 science fiction novel by Alex White

- Author: Alex White
- Audio read by: Bronson Pinchot
- Language: English
- Series: Alien
- Genre: Science fiction, horror
- Publisher: Titan Books
- Publication date: April 24, 2018
- Media type: Print, ebook, audiobook
- Pages: 332 pages
- ISBN: 1-78565-194-3 First edition hardback
- Preceded by: Alien: Covenant – Origins
- Followed by: Echo Into Charybdis

The Cold Forge is a 2018 science fiction horror novel by Alex White and the twelfth book in the third novel series based on the Alien franchise, following Dr. Blue Marsalis, a Weyland-Yutani scientist studying the xenomorph at the secret deep space research station the Cold Forge, who discovers within the species' DNA Plagiarus Praepotens, a substance used by facehuggers to rewrite a host's DNA, which may hold the secret to human immortality. It was first published in 2018 through Titan Books in audio, e-book, and print.

The novel received a universally positive critical reception. A sequel novel, Into Charybdis, was published in 2021, while story elements from the novel (in particular Plagiarus Praepotens) would be adapted to the 2024 feature film Alien: Romulus, for which White received no compensation.

== Premise ==
The Weyland-Yutani Corporation breeds Xenomorphs from eggs acquired through unknown means aboard the Cold Forge, a secret deep space research station on which the company is hoping to develop the creatures as biological weapons. Dr. Blue Marsalis, the physically handicapped scientist heading the experiments, secretly seeks to harvest a sample of a virulent mutagen produced by the Xenomorphs to cure her terminal degenerative illness, which she dubs Plagiarus Praepotens. Her research is put in jeopardy when Dorian Sudler, a malicious auditor from Weyland-Yutani, is sent to review the station's work, and an unknown saboteur simultaneously unleashes Blue's Xenomorph specimens from containment, setting them loose aboard the station.

== Publication ==
The novel was released in paperback and e-book format on April 24, 2018, in the United States and United Kingdom through Titan Books. An audiobook adaptation narrated by Bronson Pinchot was simultaneously released through Blackstone Publishing.

== Reception ==
The Cold Forge received universally positive reviews, from critical outlets such as Dread Central, Birth Movies Death, AIPT, Scified, Horror Tree, DanNagle, Geek'd Out!, Mid-Life Gamer Geek, DarnellCureton, Cinema Senties, Horror DNA, and Movie Nooz.

== In other media ==
In August 2024, Plagiarus Praepotens from the novel adapted to the feature film Alien: Romulus, written by Fede Álvarez and Rodo Sayagues; in an interview September 2024, White praised Álvarez's decision to adapt elements of The Cold Forge to a live-action Alien film, while lamenting the lack of payment he had received from 20th Century Studios for the adaptation of his story elements in the film, not having been informed of it as a possibility, hypothesising Álvarez may not have known White had created Plagiarus Praepotens when writing the film's screenplay based on a prior statement by Álvarez about how he had used the fan wiki Xenopedia as a reference point for the script over development.
