= The Shattered World (novel) =

1984 fantasy novel by Michael Reaves

- Cover of the 1st edition with wrap-around art by Rowena Morrill
- Author: Michael Reaves
- Cover artist: Rowena Morrill
- Genre: Fantasy
- Publisher: Simon & Schuster
- Publication date: 1984
- ISBN: 0671499424
- Followed by: The Burning Realm

The Shattered World is a fantasy novel by Michael Reaves that was published by Simon & Schuster in 1984. It was followed by a sequel, The Burning Realm, in 1988.

== Plot ==
Sometime in the past, a mighty wizard named The Necromancer used forbidden magic to shatter the Earth into multiple fragments. The fragments continue to orbit the sun as a group, and each fragment maintains gravity and atmosphere. The fragments are joined by a void of breathable air, and travel between them is possible. Now a group of wizards called the Circle wants to reunite the Earth's fragments, but to do so, they will need a Runestone. They recruit Beorn, a master thief, to steal a Runestone for them from another group of wizards opposed to the Circle. As critic Eric Olson noted, "The book goes on from this point to be a chase to recover the stolen Runestone and prevent the raising of the Necromancer."

== Publication history ==
In the late 1970s, Michael Reaves was a script writer for children's animated series such as The New Archie and Sabrina Hour (1977), Space Sentinels (1977) and Web Woman (1978). He had written some short stories, and co-authored two well-received works — the fantasy novel Dragonworld (1979, with Byron Preiss), and the science fiction novel Hellstar (1984, with Steve Perry). In 1984, he wrote a fantasy novel on his own, The Shattered World, which was published by Simon & Schuster in 1984. Reaves wrote a sequel, The Burning Realm, which was published in 1988.

== Reception ==
In Issue 36 of Abyss, Eric Olson noted, "The book gives the reader a good feel for the world, its people and the system of magic (though somewhat briefly)." Olson concluded, "I recommend The Shattered World on the basis of its plot ... It is enjoyable and original reading, though I wouldn't mark it as a heavyweight of fantastic literature."

Writing for Amazing Stories, Frank Catalano commented, "Reaves does a good job of taking what could be an unconvincing and implausible premise and making it work. The reason, likely, is that instead of focusing on the 'gee whiz' aspects, Reaves focuses on the characters and makes you want to know more about them." Although Catalano liked the book, he was not happy that the explanation for what had caused the Earth to break apart was only offered at the end of the book. "Instead of being a great revelation, [it] inspired a yawn. It just didn't seem to fit in with the majestic tone of the rest of the storyline." Despite this, Catalano concluded, "The Shattered World is a rich, unusual novel with an excellent focus on the people involved."

In the December 1984 issue of Analog, Tom Easton compared it to Harry Harrison's just published West of Eden, and noted the scientific implausibility of both books. Easton called The Shattered World "another grand conception, easily three times as unlikely as Harrison’s but saved because Reaves calls it fantasy." Easton summarized the book as "The chase is on, to grand and glorious effect, through dying castles and the caverns of Hell (exposed, of course, when the Earth shattered), through waterspouts and boudoirs and tombs."

== Reviews ==
- Review by Don D'Ammassa (1984) in Science Fiction Chronicle, #57 June 1984
- Review by Jackson Houser (1984) in Fantasy Review, August 1984
