= Conan and the Young Warriors =

- Genre: Children's fantasy
- Developed by: Michael Reaves
- Written by: Brynne Stephens; Michael Reaves; Steve Perry; David Wise; Len Wein
- Directed by: John Grusd; Wally Burr (voice director)
- Voices of: Phil Hayes; Mark Hildreth; Kelly Sheridan; Chiara Zanni; Jim Byrnes; Kathleen Barr; Michael Donovan
- Composers: Kinder & Co. Thomas Chase Jones; Steve Rucker
- Country of origin: United States
- Original language: English
- No. of seasons: 1
- No. of episodes: 13

Production
- Executive producers: Joe Bacall; Tom Griffin; C.J. Kettler; Stephanie Graziano.
- Producer: John Grusd
- Running time: 23 minutes
- Production companies: Sunbow Productions; Graz Entertainment; Hanho Studios; AKOM

Original release
- Network: CBS
- Release: March 5 – May 21, 1994

Related
- Conan the Adventurer

Conan and the Young Warriors is a 1994 American television animated series produced by Sunbow Entertainment and aired by CBS as a sequel to the animated series Conan the Adventurer, but featuring a different set of characters (besides Conan). The series was developed by Michael Reaves and directed by John Grusd. It lasted only for one season of 13 episodes.

== Plot ==
With Wrath-Amon vanquished and his family returned to life from living stone, Conan thought that his questing had finished. However, now he has to train and protect the "Chosen Ones", a trio of new young warriors who are in possession of magical "star stones", until the time comes in which they are destined to rule over Hyboria.

Aside from Conan's character design, which is identical to the one in Conan the Adventurer, this series has a few small links to its predecessor. Occasionally, a trumpet line piece of background music mirroring the theme to Conan the Adventurer is used. At one point, a character uses Zulu's trademark sign of Jhebbal Sag to summon animals to help them. Conan once seeks out a wizard he claims "Grey Wolf of Xanthus" told him about; he also mentions that he once knew a firebird, and jokingly claims that he ate him. The fact that Conan's sword is made of metal from the stars is mentioned several times, a reference to the original series in which a major theme was that Conan's sword was made of a magical star metal.

== Characters ==
- Conan (voiced by Phil Hayes) – Largely the same as in Conan the Adventurer, Conan is charged with bringing up the three Chosen Ones and helping them fulfill their destinies.
- Epimetrius the Sage – He is the only other character from Conan the Adventurer to appear in this series aside from Conan. It was he who chose Draegen, Brynne and Navah as the users of the starstones. Empimetrius assisted Conan in guiding the Chosen Ones.
- Draegen (voiced by Mark Hildreth) – The oldest of the Chosen Ones, he grew up in Aquilonia. The star stone on his bandana allows him to magically don a suit of invincible armor.
- Brynne (voiced by Kelly Sheridan) – The middle Chosen One who grew up as a thief in Shadizar. The star stone that is the jewel of her ring allows her to create illusions.
- Navah (voiced by Chiara Zanni) – At eight years old, the youngest of the Chosen Ones. He grew up in the Pict Eagle tribe, and the star stone in his pendant allows him to take control of animals, specifically his mongoose Tiki.
- Sulinara (voiced by Kathleen Barr) – The power-hungry, part-Serpent Man sorceress who is the primary villain of the series. She will stop at nothing to possess all of the star stones, and thereby rule Hyboria by herself.
- Graak (voiced by Michael Donovan) – The winged demon that aids Sulinara in her attempts to steal the star stones, although he cannot touch either them or Conan's star metal sword.

== Episodes ==
No.	Title	Written by	Original release date
1	"The Third Talisman"	Michael Reaves	March 5, 1994
The evil sorceress Sulinara plans to steal the three star stones belonging to Conan's young friends.
2	"Arena"	Steve Perry	March 12, 1994
Conan and his friends attempt to free a city from an evil king, but the tyrant captures Conan and leaves him in the arena to compete in a fight to the death.
3	"Dreamweaver"	Brynne Stephens	March 19, 1994
Sulinara sends nightmares upon the children, as she wants to get to their precious stones.
4	"Carnival of Cardolus"	Brynne Stephens	March 26, 1994
Conan and his charges are looking for a basilisk, scales of which are an effective means against all poisons, but an unscrupulous circus owner is also after the curious animal.
5	"Isle of the Lost"	David Wise	April 2, 1994
Sulinara is seeking a precious stone that has the power to transform people into mindless monsters.
6	"Covenant"	Len Wein	April 9, 1994
Sulinara conjures the demon lord Demonicus to get the star-stones of Conan's young friends – in return, he can take revenge on Conan, against whom he has once suffered a bitter defeat.
7	"Wolf in the Fold"	Michael Reaves and Steve Perry	April 9, 1994
An earthquake awakens the shapeshifter that was sealed beneath the ruins where Conan and the children reside.
8	"Once a Thief"	Bryce Malek and David Wise	April 16, 1994
Loki manipulates Brynne into stealing his hammer back from the King of Shadizar.
9	"Brothers of the Sword"	Bryce Malek and David Wise	April 23, 1994
Conan reluctantly works with the shaman of Navah's Pict tribe to stop a possessed old ally from resurrecting a monster called the Unitaur.
10	"Feet of Clay"	Bryce Malek	April 30, 1994
A sorcerer steals a mystical shield that was being guarded by Draegen's cowardly former mentor, Commander Horus.
11	"The Hand of Fate"	Brynne Stephens	May 7, 1994
The Young Warriors encounter Tisara, a beautiful trained warrior with skills beyond their own. She claims that Brynne, an admitted former thief, stole the star stone that was rightfully hers.
12	"The Separation"	Michael Reaves	May 14, 1994
Epimetrius informs Conan that his time with the Young Warriors is at an end, and that they will now be mentored by Ninjus. Ninjus is actually a servant of Necromas, an evil deity who has enslaved Epimetrius.
13	"The Night of the Serpent"	Lydia C. Marano and Brynne Stephens	May 21, 1994
Draegen falls in love with a princess who a prophecy alleges will marry a descendant of Set.

== Home releases ==
Eight episodes were released over four DVD volumes by MRA Entertainment in Australia, followed by a DVD pack containing the four DVD volumes.

DVD title	Release date	Episodes
Volume 1	March 23, 2003	"Isle of the Lost" and "Dreamweaver"
Volume 2	March 23, 2003	"Carnival of Cardolus" and "Wolf in the Fold"
Volume 3	March 23, 2003	"Brothers of the Sword" and "Arena"
Volume 4	March 23, 2003	"The Covenant" and "The Third Talisman"
4 Pack	March 13, 2006	"Isle of the Lost", "Dreamweaver", "Carnival of Cardolus", "Wolf in the Fold", "Brothers of the Sword", "Arena", "The Covenant" and "The Third Talisman"

== Reception ==
According to The A.V. Club, this cartoon, like its predecessor, "has been significantly defanged, dumbing down and infantilizing the character to the degree that he’s robbed of his savage appeal".
