= Conan the Free Lance =

Book by Steve Perry

- Cover of first edition
- Author: Steve Perry
- Cover artist: Kirk Reinert
- Language: English
- Series: Conan the Barbarian
- Genre: Sword and sorcery
- Publisher: Tor Books
- Publication date: 1990
- Publication place: United States
- Media type: Print (Paperback)
- Pages: 279
- ISBN: 0-8125-0690-1

Conan the Free Lance is a fantasy novel by American writer Steve Perry, featuring Robert E. Howard's sword and sorcery hero Conan the Barbarian. It was first published in paperback by Tor Books in February 1990. It was reprinted by Tor in December 1997.

== Plot ==
The evil wizard Dimma the Mist Mage suffers from a curse that has rendered his body insubstantial. As a mystical "Seed" held by the Tree Folk might restore him, he directs his enslaved selkies to steal it for him. A race of lizard people also desires the Seed, as its power of fertility is key to enabling them to establish a new home. Meanwhile, the young Conan, en route to Shadizar, had fallen in with the Tree Folk after rescuing their medicine woman, Cheen. He helps them fend off the selkies' attack, but not before one of them makes off with the Seed and takes Cheen's brother Hok hostage. In the ensuing many-sided contest for the Seed, Conan aids the Tree Folk in recovering it.

== Reception ==
Reviewer Ryan Harvey considered Perry's Conan novels "goofy", noting that the author "has a reputation among Conan fandom for overkill and general silliness"—and Conan the Free Lance "won't change anyone's mind about Perry's style." He rates it well below the author's previous novels Conan the Fearless and Conan the Defiant and feels the "one arena" in which it excels is in its brevity.

Don D'Ammassa calls the book "[a]nother unusual Conan pastiche" with "some quite well done adventures."

Preceded by Conan the Indomitable	Tor Conan series (publication order)	Succeeded by Conan the Formidable
Preceded by Conan the Indomitable	Complete Conan Saga (William Galen Gray chronology)	Succeeded by Conan the Formidable
