= The Man Who Never Missed =

1985 novel by Steve Perry

- First edition
- Author: Steve Perry
- Cover artist: James Gurney
- Language: English
- Series: The Matador Series
- Genre: Science fiction
- Publisher: Ace Books
- Publication date: August 1985
- Publication place: United States
- Media type: Print (paperback)
- Pages: 195
- ISBN: 0-441-51916-4
- OCLC: 50879873
- Followed by: Matadora

The Man Who Never Missed is the first book in the Matador series, by Steve Perry. It was first published in August 1985.

== Plot ==
The Man Who Never Missed concerns an ex-soldier, Emile Khadaji, formerly in the service of the Confed, a generic star-spanning empire (formally a confederacy, hence the name) of star systems. The Confed has grown large and old, and to maintain its fading grip on power, uses its powerful military to brutally suppress any resistance and to colonialize further worlds. During one such campaign which results in the slaughter of three-quarters of a million people in a single pitched battle, Khadaji snaps and deserts while experiencing a religious epiphany which instills in him the belief that taking the lives of sapient beings is wrong and that the Confed must be overthrown. He escapes and is believed dead by his military superiors.

While wandering in the nearby city and pondering his experience, the young Khadaji runs into the mysterious priest "Pen" (Pen being not his real name but rather his title; as the current Pen, Pen goes about enshrouded so that his flesh cannot be seen), of the order of the Siblings of the Shroud. Pen takes Khadaji in as a student, training him in Pen's martial art sumito ("The 97 steps"; based on the martial art silat). Pen also teaches Khadaji the surprisingly complex craft of bartending to the many worlds of the Confed.

While working as a bartender on the world of Rim, Khadaji falls in love with an albino "exotic" (a descendant of humans genetically engineered to be sexually attractive, exude sex pheromones, and have an extremely high libido). Eventually he realizes the extent to which she cheats on him and how she views his martial arts skills as a useful way to protect herself from lustful males. Khadaji comes to the conclusion that he needs to further his war against the Confed, but bartending on Rim was wasting time. At this point, Pen and Khadaji part ways after a relationship encompassing years.

Travelling to a college planet, Khadaji begins learning economics and politics and military science. While there, he masters the nonlethal civilian weapon: the spetsdōd. The spetsdōd is a small weapon which is unobtrusively mounted on the back of one's hands; it is contacted by the index finger to fire. When the finger is hyperextended, the spetsdōd detonates the loaded dart, propelling it down the length of the index finger at whatever the shooter aims at. Within 20 meters, it is described as being an extremely fast and precise weapon—pointshooting taken to its logical conclusion.

With his weapon and target chosen, Khadaji carefully embarks on a large-scale and careful career of smuggling—a career chosen for its ability to garner the large sums of money which Khadaji needs and because it does not necessarily compromise his ethics; Khadaji reasons that as long as he does not transport health-compromising narcotics, his will be victimless crimes. His criminal empire grows quickly, and Khadaji devotes his fortunes to combat training with his spetsdōd. Eventually, he decides to test his skills against the best living opponents he can find, in real life-or-death situations:

He considered where he could get such experience. There was the Musashi Flex, a loosely-organized band of modern rōnins who travelled around challenging each other; he could try that. Or, there was The Maze. Such a thing was risky, but it offered a real test. Injury was likely, death a possibility in the game known as The Maze; if he could survive that, maybe he would be ready....

The Musashi Flex would later be the subject of Perry's 2006 novel of the same name. The Maze mentioned is a multiple-day unarmed combat tournament set in a ruined city; the last person conscious wins an extremely large monetary prize. No rules other than not interfering with the medical robots rescuing a downed contestant, and not bringing any weapons with one into the tournament, are observed. Khadaji wins, and is convinced to launch his personal war.

This he does by buying and fortifying a bar on a recently occupied planet called Greaves. Despite being a highly successful smuggler with access to any weapon he needs, he chooses instead to steal several spetsdōds and 10,000 rounds of non-lethal ammunition from a local military garrison so the authorities have a record of exactly how many rounds he has stolen. Despite being classified as non-lethal, the stolen ammunition is insidious: it injects a victim with a potent cocktail of drugs that violently locks up every voluntary muscle in the body, inducing total body paralysis for six months. The unfortunate soul is unable to move, eat, or speak, and requires expensive round-the-clock Confed care. In a calculated campaign against the Confed forces, Khadaji employs strategic guerrilla tactics, targeting troops with stolen weaponry and ammunition. Over the span of six months, he successfully incapacitates 2,388 out of the 10,000 garrisoned soldiers, with only a handful of shots missing, a meticulous act he covers up by surreptitiously adding extra rounds to the stolen ammo.

While eavesdropping on a conversation between soldiers in his bar, Khadaji learns that his victims are beginning to emerge from their paralysis, prompting military intelligence's eagerness to interrogate them. Realizing his time is limited and that the potential exposure of his identity looms, Khadaji swiftly executes the final stage of his plan.

He contacts the head of the Confed forces on the planet, claiming possession of vital information regarding the leaders of the Shamba Freedom Forces, a revelation the military is desperate to obtain. Refusing a military escort, Khadaji insists on delivering the information himself to the commander's office. Once there, he astounds the commander by revealing that he is the sole member of the "Shamba Freedom Force" before swiftly incapacitating him with a dart concealed in a cigarette.

With his mission accomplished, Khadaji retreats to his bar, securing himself inside the massive vault where he reflects on his past while anticipating the inevitable retribution from the military. The wait is brief as the army swiftly surrounds the bar, realizing Khadaji's involvement in the commander's attack. Despite the vault's resilience against their weapons, the military resorts to an "implosion bomb," aimed at obliterating the safe haven. The ensuing explosion engulfs the bar, the vault, and likely Khadaji himself, effectively ending the insurgency.

Scouring through the wreckage, the military only manages to identify a human body among the debris, failing to confirm if it indeed belongs to Khadaji. However, a startling discovery emerges during the molecular scanning of the compressed safe rubble. A technician brings the revelation to the new commander, who initially dismisses its significance, believing the resistance to have dissolved with Khadaji's demise. Yet, upon closer inspection, the commander is forced to confront the staggering reality: Khadaji acted alone, single-handedly orchestrating the entire insurgency without ever missing a shot.

Recognizing the catastrophic implications for the Confed's reputation, the commander swiftly orders the newfound information to be secured under the highest level of confidentiality. However, he acknowledges that it may be too late, as the revelation of the "Man Who Never Missed" would undoubtedly galvanize countless individuals across Confed-controlled planets to rise against their oppressors, inspired by Khadaji's audacious defiance.
