= Conan the Formidable =

Book by Steve Perry

- Cover of first edition
- Author: Steve Perry
- Cover artist: Kirk Reinert
- Language: English
- Series: Conan the Barbarian
- Genre: Sword and sorcery
- Publisher: Tor Books
- Publication date: 1990
- Publication place: United States
- Media type: Print Paperback
- Pages: 274
- ISBN: 0-8125-0998-6

Conan the Formidable is a fantasy novel by American writer Steve Perry, featuring Robert E. Howard's sword and sorcery hero Conan the Barbarian. It was first published in trade paperback by Tor Books in November 1990; a regular paperback edition followed from the same publisher in August 1991, and was reprinted in June 1998.

== Plot summary ==
The novel opens with Conan walking into Shadizar through the Karpash Mountains. He is ambushed by some bandits in the mountains and rescued by a giantess named Teyle. She leads Conan back to her village in the swamp they inhabit at the foot of a mountain. The swamp is also inhabited by Vargs, who are described as "Green dwarves" and act more like goblins or orcs. Upon arriving, he is knocked out by Teyle to be experimented upon by the request of Raseri, the village chieftain and Teyle's father.

Conan awakens inside a cage made from the bones of giants and finds he's being experimented upon by Raseri. Raseri is performing research on the physical endurance of damage in humans. Meanwhile, Dake the freakmaster is on his way to the giant's village with his entourage of Penz the wolfman, Tro the catwoman, Sab the four-armed man, and Kreg his assistant. Dake's mission is to capture a giant and a "green dwarf" for his freak show.

On the way, Dake's freak show is attacked by Vargs, but the creatures are scared off by a massive red demon which Dake summons (which is an illusion). Penz captures one of the Vargs at the behest of Dake. Dake promptly hypnotizes his Varg into servitude. The Varg that is captured turns out to be Vilken, the son of Fosull, a Varg chieftain.

Conan eventually escapes the cage in which he is being held and sets fire to Raseri's hut, sending all of his research on humans into flames. Conan escapes into the swamp, running across some Vargs and killing several of them. Meanwhile, Dake arrives at night in the hopes of capturing a giant for his freak show with the help of Tro the catwoman's night vision. The flaming hut distracts many of the giants and Dake is able to capture Teyle, as well as Morja and Oren, who are also Raseri's children.

As Conan escapes, the giants release their "Hellhounds", a massive beast with the appearance of a cross between a bear and a wolf. The hellhounds, Vargs, and giants are tracking Conan in that order of following. Soon, Conan slays all the hellhounds. When the Vargs and giants find these corpses, they are amazed. Conan finally escapes the swamp only to be magically captured by Dake.

Figuring that more of his own kind will attract too much attention, Raseri decides to leave the swamp to look for his children by asking the local humans if they have seen a man resembling Conan. Fosull decides on a similar plan, but coats himself in mud (so as not to display his green skin) and follows the cart's tracks, knowing what they look like. Fosull manages to get a ride with a drunken wine seller in his cart. Dake forces Conan to display his strength so that it may be measured. Dake learns that Conan is stronger than all the rest of his freak show combined and sets Conan to use as his strongman for the traveling circus.

Raseri eventually finds Fosull's wagon and learns that the cart in front of him contains a Varg who is tracking their children. Fosull learns that he is being tracked by a giant, but knows not who. Dake exhibits his circus to a village. Eventually, Conan discovers that rage helps in weakening Dake's spell. Soon, Penz reveals he knows a few of Dake's spells.

Fosull and Raseri form a temporary alliance to rescue their children. Dake meets up with a caravan of other merchants. They stop for the night and Dake sends Morja to the leader of the caravan as a gift. Raseri and Fosull have managed to sneak up secretly. This enrages Dake's slaves and they manage to break the spell of entrapment set upon them. The former-slaves, Raseri, and Fosull manage to rescue Morja before she arrives at the merchant's wagon.

The group kills the merchant and several guards in the ensuing battle. Oren throws a rock at Dake as he's reciting his enslavement spell. The spell gets 2/3 done and binds the ex-slaves, Raseri, and Fousull (except for Conan) before the thrown rock smashes Dake's teeth preventing the final articulation of the spell. Conan promptly slays Dake in the process.

Raseri is convinced that the group should not be able to leave knowing how to get to his village of giants. Raseri tells the group that he has a potion which will help them forget how to get to his village. However, his potion is actually a poison. Penz sprinkles a powder (stolen from Dake) that turns all liquid to water into the cups of the slaves while Raseri is not watching. Everyone drinks the potion and Raseri reveals they are about to die. Fosull, whose drink was not sprinkled with the magical powder, kills Raseri with his poisoned spear and dies shortly afterwards. Raseri's death also prevents the poison from taking effect. Soon, Teyle decides to let the group leave and the book is concluded.

== Reception ==
Don D'Ammassa calls the book "the weakest of Perry's [Conan] pastiches, but still not bad."

| Preceded by Conan the Free Lance | Tor Conan series (publication order) | Succeeded by Conan the Guardian |
| Preceded by Conan the Free Lance | Complete Conan Saga (William Galen Gray chronology) | Succeeded by "The Tower of the Elephant" |
