= Conan the Adventurer (1992 TV series) =

Television series

- Genre: Action-adventure; Sword and sorcery Fantasy
- Created by: Ray DeLaurentis
- Based on: Conan the Barbarian by Robert E. Howard
- Developed by: Christy Marx
- Voices of: Michael Donovan; Scott McNeil; Janyse Jaud; Garry Chalk; Richard Newman; Doug Parker; John Pyper-Ferguson; Lee Tockar
- Composers: Thomas Chase Jones; Steve Rucker
- Countries of origin: United States; Canada; France
- No. of seasons: 2
- No. of episodes: 65 (list of episodes)

Production
- Executive producers: Tom Griffin; Joe Bacall; C.J. Kettler; Jean Chalopin
- Running time: 22 minutes
- Production companies: Sunbow Productions; Graz Entertainment (season 1); Créativité et Développement (season 2); AB Productions (season 2)

Original release
- Network: Syndication (United States); M6 (France)
- Release: September 13, 1992 – November 23, 1993

Conan the Adventurer is an animated television series adaptation of the character Conan the Barbarian created by Robert E. Howard. Produced by Jetlag Productions in association with Sunbow Productions, the series debuted on September 13, 1992, ran for 65 episodes and concluded on November 22, 1993. The series was developed by Christy Marx who served as the sole story editor. The series was produced in association with Graz Entertainment for the first 13-episode season; AB Productions and Jean Chalopin's Créativité et Développement for the remaining episodes. The series also spawned a small toyline in 1992 created by Hasbro. This first incarnation of Conan in cartoon form performed much better than its follow-up cartoon, Conan and the Young Warriors, which lasted only 13 episodes.

== Plot ==
Conan lives in Cimmeria with his parents throughout his childhood. While out with his grandfather one night on a trek, "fiery tears" or meteors drop from the skies. Conan collects them and brings them back to his family. Conan's father, the village blacksmith, uses the ore from the meteors to forge Star Metal and uses it to create tools and weapons that would never rust or break or dull. He sells them, but his finest work, a magnificent sword, he keeps for Conan. It is laid in a crypt and covered over with a heavy stone slab. Conan's father tells his son that only when he is "man enough" (i.e., strong enough) to push off the stone slab, can he rightfully claim the sword.

Meanwhile, the Serpent Man wizard Wrath-Amon learns of Star Metal and that in addition to its strength that it possesses the power to open portals between dimensions. He thus seeks Star Metal to release his deity Set from "the Abyss" to which he long before was banished by the combined powers of virtually every living wizard then on Earth for trying to enslave the human race. As part of his search, Wrath-Amon seeks out Conan's family. Conan's father tells Wrath-Amon that he sold all of the Star Metal, but the wizard refuses to believe it. The wizard is right for aside from the sword, Conan's father hid pieces of Star Metal with other villagers. Wrath-Amon uses the spell of living stone upon Conan's family.

Conan by then went to claim his Star Metal sword to attack Wrath-Amon and his followers. When the Star Metal sword gets near Wrath-Amon, it disrupts his magic and shows his reptilian face. To this, he says "Those who see the true face of Wrath-Amon must perish!". (Note: This scene is similar to one in the film.) After chasing away the wizard, Conan turns to his family and swears in the name of their god Crom to find a way of releasing them from the spell.

Conan's adventures thus begin as he searches Hyboria looking for a way to cure his family and free the land from Wrath-Amon's rule. Wrath-Amon's henchmen are also shapeshifting Serpent Men. When Conan's Star Metal sword is close enough to them, it breaks the spell that disguises them and reveals their true form to be Serpent Men. When Star Metal makes contact with the Serpent Men, it banishes them to the Abyss with Set. Spies and agents of Set and Stygia, many of them also Serpent Men, are present in cities, nations and tribes throughout the land in the age of Conan.

As compared with the original Conan stories and the Marvel Comics such as King Conan, Conan Saga, Conan the Barbarian and Conan the King, the cartoon Conan displays a higher degree of modern morality. While the original Conan is a thief, a killer, and a philanderer, the cartoon Conan has more in common with sword-wielding children's cartoon characters such as He-Man. At one point, he refuses to join a pirate crew on the grounds that it is wrong to steal, he refuses to strike unarmed or defeated opponents. He is a kind and caring character, albeit a little naive, who stands up for his friends and what he sees to be right and is very respectable. The show also reduced the violence of the original to levels deemed suitable for the younger target audience, deliberately making the Serpent Men "banished" with any touch of the heroes' weapons rather than actually struck.

== Episodes ==
Series	Episodes	Originally released	
Series	Episodes	First released	Last released
1	13	13 September 1992	6 December 1992
2	52	13 September 1993	23 November 1993

== Characters ==
=== Heroes ===
- Conan (voiced by Michael Donovan) the main character of the animated series, a brave barbarian from Cimmeria, the king of the Atlanteans, as he later learns. He is tall, long-haired and possesses a large muscular build. Conan wears the Vathelos amulet, the true properties of which he learns later on. In the first episodes, he cannot read, washes once a year, and prefers brute force. Over time, he masters literacy, martial arts and other knowledge. When Conan was a slave-rower on the galleys of Rat-Amon, he met Zula, the king of the black Vassai tribe, and also a hypnotist. After the release, Conan and Zula became blood brothers. Thanks to Zula and Jaballu, he found his totem animal – a lion. Conan sacredly honors the customs of his people and the god Crom, whom he often mentions.
  - Thunder is Conan's willful (but loyal) horse, eventually armed with Star Metal horse shoes made from Snagg's grapnel.
- Needle (voiced by Michael Beattie) is Conan's feisty fledgling phoenix sidekick and only constant companion. He is able to enter flat surfaces and magically transform into a phoenix design (although he needed his magical tail feathers to accomplish this feat, and loses this power if he lost one of them). He spent most of his time inside Conan's shield. Needle speaks in the third person giving others nicknames and loves to eat pomegranates. He eventually learns how to harness his full power and aid Conan in battle. When in public, Needle poses as a parrot in order to not arouse suspicion, an act which he greatly resents.
- Zula (voiced by Arthur Burghardt) is the king of the black tribe of the Vassai, cousin of Horus. A black warrior with the same muscular build as Conan. Zula's face has three multi-colored triangles on both sides – the symbol of the Vassai. Zula met Conan as a rowing slave in the galleys of Rath Amon. After his release, he considers the Cimmerian his blood brother. Educated, prudent and wise, he worships the animal spirit of Jebalah. Using his sign, the Vassai king can summon wild animals for help. Thanks to Jeballu, Zula also mastered hypnosis and acquired his totem animal, the tiger. In battle, he first uses a bolas of star metal, which entangles enemies. In addition, Zula is a masterful archer, martial arts master and professional hunter. At the end of the series, he accepted Jasmine's invitation and performs in the circus as a hypnotist, trainer and strongman in the arena. Zula also became Greywulf's student and is learning magic. Also at the end of the series, Zula became the husband of Princess Azurel, who became the queen of the Wassai tribe.
- Jezmine (voiced by Janyse Jaud) is a circus performer who possesses a set of Star Metal throwing stars, she started off as a thief but became an honest woman for the rest of the series (but is in love with Conan nonetheless). Her parents are later revealed to be a nobleman and woman in the city of Tarantia. To her horror, she learns that her mother serves Wrath-Amon and her father is the Serpent Man Astivus, making her a half-breed. From that moment, she is terrified her Serpent Man heritage will assert itself. When her father Astivus, who embraced life as a human and loved Jezmine's mother, sides with Jezmine and her mother against Wrath-Amon, Wrath-Amon banishes her father and mother to the Abyss. A magical potion applied to her Star Metal shuriken allow Jezmine to magically summon the throwing stars to return to her. She shared this potion with Zula. Jezmine hated Astivus, despite his love for her. She and Conan were able to free her mother during a trip to the Abyss, and later Astivus escaped when Set and the Serpent-Men banished over the years were freed from the Abyss by Wrath-Amon. Once again, Astivus chose Jezmine and her mother over serving Set, embracing life as a human; and it is implied in the final episode that Jezmine might be willing to reconcile with him. At the end of the series, she invited Zula to her circus troupe as a hypnotist, trainer and strongman.
- Greywolf (voiced by Scott McNeil) is a wizard from the magical city of Xanthus. Originally armed with a bare staff, he was given the mystical "Claw of Heaven" made of Star Metal that was mounted atop his staff and effectively doubled his magical power. His brother and sister were transformed into wolves in a plot by the Stygian queen and sorceress Mesmira. As a result, he consistently seeks a cure for their condition alongside of Conan; whom he now serves as an advisor to in matters of supernatural nature. At the end of the series, he became Zula's teacher and teaches him magic.
  - Sasha (voiced by Kathleen Barr) and Misha (voiced by Scott McNeil) are Greywolf's older brother and sister who are also skilled in magic. They were transformed into wolves by Mesmira using poison from the thorns of the Lycanthrus Plant as part of her plot to become powerful. In the episode "Thorns of Midnight," a single flower from the Lycanthrus Plant was found that could transform one of the siblings back into a human. Not wanting to have to choose, the flower was split down the middle, with Sasha and Misha each eating half. This allows them to revert to their human forms during a full moon.
- Snagg (voiced by Garry Chalk) is a Viking-like barbarian from the Vanirmen tribe. He often quarrels with Conan because they grew up in neighboring countries with different culture. Once even a war happened between them. Despite it, Snagg and Conan are true friends. Snagg also has Star Metal weapons in the form of an axe and grapnel. Later, he gave his grapnel to make Star Metal horseshoes for Thunder when Thunder saved his life. Conan and Snagg start as rivals, but become increasingly friendly. They continue to compete with and insult each other, but it becomes jovial and good-natured. Snagg and Conan are very similar, though Snagg is generally less serious and controlled.
- Falkenar (voiced by Alec Willows) is champion of the kingdom of Kusan, he uses the "Mantle of Wind" to fly and is armed with a Star Metal whip. Falkenar and Windfang are bitter enemies through repeated attempts by the villain to invade Kusan. He has a female pet falcon named Stormclaw.

=== Supporting ===
- The Kari Dragon (voiced by Doug Parker) – The Kari Dragon is a dragon who was once imprisoned in an artifact and could be summoned to do the bidding of mortal men. Conan summoned him and granted him freedom for which the dragon was grateful. However, when Conan later came to him for aid, the dragon gave him a series of tests which Conan passed. When the final battle against Set came, the dragon battled Set to provide Conan with enough time to escape Set and his minions, sacrificing himself in the process.
- Pyro (voiced by Doug Parker) – An ancient phoenix who was to guard the mystical Book of Skelos. At some point in time, he was corrupted by Wrath-Amon; changing his feathers into dark colors and tasking him with killing anyone who came near the book instead of simply testing them. Pyro takes advantage of his status as a high phoenix to trick Needle to trust him before kidnapping the smaller firebird and forcing him to do his bidding. Unfortunately, Needle's loyalty to Conan and his friends proves too strong and he ends up aiding in the larger phoenix's defeat when he gets exposed to the raw power of the Book of Skelos thrown at him; seemingly dying as he falls to his death in the mountain and explosion. The book is destroyed yet Pyro is freed from Wrath-Amon's spell, returning to his true colors. Pyro informs Conan's group of a second Book of Skelos. He declares Needle his "little brother" and foresees him becoming strong like Pyro himself due to his powerful heart.
- Epimetrius the Sage (voiced by Jim Byrnes) – The leader of the wizards that banished Set to the Abyss thousands of years ago. His ghost is Conan's guide in his quest against Wrath-Amon and to free his parents. Epimetrius presents Conan his shield and companion Needle and on a few occasions aids Conan in his adventures.
- Zogar Sag (voiced by Doug Parker) – The Pict shaman-chief Zogar Sag aids Conan and his friends in battle against Wrath-Amon, their common enemy. Unlike in the novels and comics, he does not worship Jhebbal-Sag.
- Wendini (voiced by Kathleen Barr) – An enchantress known as the Wolfmother who lives in the north and views wolves as her children. She saves Greywolf after he is injured by a trap set for wolves by hunters and briefly transforms him into a wolf to better understand his brother and sister when they are lost in the wilderness when dominated by their repressed wolf instincts. In the process, she and Greywolf grow genuine feelings for one another. She becomes an ally of Conan's through her love with Greywolf and upon seeing Conan fight to defend her wolves from hunters.
- Conn (voiced by Richard Newman) - Conan's sagely yet powerful grandfather. Like Conan's father and mother, he was turned to stone by Wrath-Aman and stayed that way for a time. Wrath-Aman later attacked the village again, destroying it, and abducting the statures of Conan's parents; but the villagers managed save Conn's statue by hiding it in the well. Using a spell he had found, Conan managed to restore him to flesh again. He then aids his grandson however he can when not trying to help rebuild their home, and he has just as much of a thirst for battle and adventure as Conan does.
- Dong Hee (voiced by Richard Newman) – An elder among the Silent Dragons of Phenion, Dong Hee was Conan's instructor in the art of ninjutsu and become an infrequent ally and father figure.
- Torrinon (voiced by Garry Chalk) – Master inventor and a descendant from wizards, Torrinon is a little person that showed little talent in actual magic, but would apply himself after meeting Conan.

=== Villains ===
==== The Snake Cult ====
The Snake Cult is an evil religion that worships Set and lures away victims, even rulers who fear the wrath of Wrath-Amon. Wrath-Amon preaches the wicked religion of Set and so did the sorcerer Ram-Amon before him. While some of its members are human, current or former, the Snake Cult's primary members are the reptilian Serpent Men. While able to assume human form, the Serpent Men share their god Set's weakness for Star Metal and would end up in the Abyss if exposed to anything made of Star Metal.

- Set (voiced by Richard Newman) is a e snake-like deity of the Stygians. Set was banished by magicians many thousands of years ago and longs to return to the world to enslave all of humanity. To do this, he requires several pyramids with rings of star metal, for which his minions hunt relentlessly. The most dangerous of Conan's enemies, Set possesses incomparable strength and great hypnotic power.
- Wrath-Amon (voiced by Scott McNeil) is the evil sorcerer who currently leads the Snake Cult as its high priest and is the personal enemy of Conan. He was originally a large gila monster but was transformed into a Serpent Man-like creature by his master, Ram-Amon. In the series finale, Wrath-Amon is empowered by Set, greatly increasing in size, but Conan manages to return him to his original gila monster form with the power of the Amulet of Vathelos.
  - Dregs (voiced by Doug Parker) is Wrath-Amon's sneaky Nāga assistant with a hood like a cobra and a rattle like a rattlesnake.
- Skulkur (voiced by Scott McNeil in his first appearance, Doug Parker for the rest of the series) is one of Wrath-Amon's henchmen. A powerful undead who can raise skeletons as warriors and star metal would break the spell that animated them. He was once Sakumbe (voiced by Blu Mankuma), a human member of another Snake Cult branch in Africa where Set is worshipped as Damballah (it is assumed that they are cannibalistic as well). Sakumbe helped a man seize the power of the high priest in return for a promise of power, but the new high priest betrayed him. He then swore himself into Wrath-Amon's service, who empowered him with the Black Ring. When he tried to take his revenge, the new high priest who had betrayed him tried to transform him into a zombie slave, but his magic and the Black Ring's magic clashed and transformed him into Skulkur.
- Windfang (voiced by Doug Parker) is a fire-breathing, four-armed winged dragonoid enslaved by Wrath-Amon. Windfang was once a human general named Venturas from Koth who opposed Wrath-Amon 200 years before the events in the series. His king sent him to invade Stygia, but his men fled from Wrath-Amon's evil sorcery. Venturas fought on, but he was captured and mutated by Wrath-Amon. Being a cruel despot, he then released Windfang who flew to his fiancée who screamed and reacted with horror upon seeing him. Realizing he had nothing left to live for upon Wrath-Amon finding him in his eyrie, he agreed to serve Wrath-Amon upon his arrival in exchange for a promise to transform him back into a human. In one occasion, he succeeds in breaking his curse and regaining his human form. But upon returning to Koth, he realizes that all the things and people he cared about no longer existed, leaving Venturas without a purpose in life. After Wrath-Amon appears and forcefully transforms him into Windfang again upon sacrificing himself, he resigns his fate as the villain's servant.
- Ram-Amon (voiced by Scott McNeil) is Wrath Amon's creator and predecessor, a Stygian sorcerer and apparently of a human-like race. After creating the lizard man who became Wrath Amon, Ram-Ammon is betrayed by his creation after he lost the black ring. After at least 200 years of imprisonment (as Wrath-Amon was shown to be the leader when Windfang as Venturas invaded Stygia 200 years ago), he was released by Conan as he knew the knowledge of the Black Ring. He later replaced Wrath-Amon in aiding Set after his defeat by Conan, and escaped following the defeat of Set.

==== Other villains ====
- Mesmira (voiced by Kathleen Barr) is a Stygian witch who acts as an adversary, and sometimes an unreliable ally of the protagonists. Secretly dreams of overthrowing Rath-Amon to become the forever young queen of Stygia. Not indifferent to Conan and Zula; unable to seduce them, she tries to subdue the barbarian and king with the help of hypnosis and make them her personal slaves. Her fascination with Conan and Zula is particularly disliked by Jasmine, in part due to her own love for Conan and her friendship with Zula. The second implacable enemy of Mesmira is Greywulf, whose brother and sister were turned into wolves by a sorceress. The protagonists do not trust the insidious Mesmira, but she more than once manages to set them conditions that they cannot refuse. At the end of the series, Mesmira wins the remains of the Black Ring.
- Gora (voiced by Garry Chalk) is Zula's cousin. Hoping to overthrow the Vassai king, he secretly serves Rath-Amon and intrigues the protagonists. Witch. He has the same muscular build as Conan and Zula. Unlike Zula, Horu does not possess hypnosis, but uses black magic, in particular, Voodoo magic. Using dolls, Voodoo tried to kill Conan and Zulu, but the intervention of Conan and Amra's lion did not allow him to do so. Gora is finally imprisoned.
- Yin Doo (voiced by Scott McNeil) is a warlord who was exiled from Kusan for his evil deeds. He often teams up with Windfang in his various plots. His final fate is unknown.

== References to deities ==
There are references to other beings (mostly deities) most of which who are never seen in the series.

- Crom – The main deity of the Cimmerians. In Conan the Barbarian he was a Deity of the earth and asked the recently dead before they entered Valhalla the secret of steel. In this series, it is learned that he fervently believes in freedom of men when Conan is offered a chance to rule a city and its slaves which he outright refuses.
- Mitra – Another deity who does not appear but has priests. In the series finale it is revealed that he has paladins and one of his priests marries a couple.
- Kraken – Mentioned by a pirate in an episode of Conan. It stands to reason that this is a sea deity as the Kraken was a mythical creature of the sea in Norse Mythology.
- Woden – The main deity of the Vanirmen.
- Tarim – A deity worshiped in Xanthus.
- Jhebbal-Sag (voiced by Richard Newman in normal form, Doug Parker in corrupted form) – The Lord of Beasts worshiped by the Wasai, he could be invoked to commune with animals. He appeared once in the series in the episode "The Vengeance of Jhebbal Sag." He was captured and corrupted by Wrath'Amon before being restored to his normal self.
- Erlik the Flame-Lord (voiced by Scott McNeil) – Wielder of the Crystal of Light and responsible for the imprisonment of the elder demon Shulgareth, the ruling family of Kusan descended from his blood. He appeared once in the series in the episode "When Tolls the Bell of Night." One of his feats of seeming divine was to bring light to world after imprisoning the demon.
- Ahx' oon – a being which may be a deity, which appeared in the episode Curse of Ahx'oon, He/it is a large masked creature who resides in a lava pit, and is greatly respected for its knowledge and counsel. A follower of it said she would marry Set himself if Ahx'oon wished it. He was able to be controlled by a mask.
- Herarora, Child of the Sun - Mentioned by Pyro, a fully grown Phoenix in the Crevasse of Winds Episode, invoked in a spell to heal his injured wing.
- Ondarvard- mentioned by the spellbinder in the episode Birth of Wrath Amon, is invoked to send himself and Conan to different points in time, also invoked by Greywolf to send Conan back into the past, most likely a deity of time.

== Nations, tribes, and groups ==
- Cimmerians – Conan is a Cimmerian, a tribe that tends animals in the mountains and valleys. Despite being called barbarians, they have settlements and do not invade other towns when not at war. Barbarian is probably a reference to their relative primitiveness; they have villages, but not large towns, wear little clothing, paint their bodies for war, and are largely warriors. They are descended from the Atlantians. Their chief, and possibly only, deity is Crom.
- Wasai – The Wasai are a large, powerful and wealthy tribe, of whom Zula is a prince. The Wasai are African and live in the jungle.
- Vanirmen – The Vanirmen, including Snagg, are a barbarian tribe almost completely analogous to Vikings, except that they are not pillagers. They serve a god called "Woden" and are a seafaring and fishing tribe, whose organization and outlook is similar to the Cimmerians.
- Picts – The Picts are an extremely primitive tribe, who paint their bodies. They are similar to the Picts of Scotland, in the name, painting, and habit of pillaging other towns, though they live in or near the jungle. Nearby tribes and nations tend to fear the Picts.

== Production ==
In the early 90s, Sunbow Productions acquired the license to Robert E. Howard's sword and sorcery character Conan the Barbarian to be adapted as an animated television series for syndication beginning with an initial run of 13 episodes followed by an additional 52 episodes if the show performed well in the ratings. Then Sunbow Vice President of Production, Carole Weitzman, stated the series, titled Conan the Adventurer, would be focusing on a younger incarnation of the character who would be less grim and battle hardened in order to lighten the tone seen in the original novels, comics, and films that previously depicted the character. When Christy Marx was hired as Story editor on the series, she initially reacted at the concept of making a children's show out of Conan with skepticism, but took the position knowing she could make the concept work. In developing the series, Marx read through the entirety of Howard penned Conan stories and figuring out what core elements of the character could be kept and which others would have to go. In order to get around the violence of Conan stories, the enemies were made magical in nature so that when Conan faced off against them they'd glow and puff out of existence rather than be slain in a bloody fashion. Marx had wanted to portray Conan as a loner, but due to Hasbro holding the toy rights to Conan and partnering on the series this warranted the creation of companions for Conan. For the villains, Marx had wanted to use Thoth Amon but was not allowed to use the name so Wrath Amon was created instead. For the various snake-men in the series, Marx took inspiration from another Howard character Kull of Atlantis. The writers were aware that the toned down version of Conan would invite comparisons to He-Man and the Masters of the Universe but emphasized that aside from centering on burly young men with swords, there weren't any other parallels aside from one writer throwing out the idea of adding a saber-toothed tiger to the cast which was nixed by Marx. The series was put together to replace Sunbow's failed Bucky O'Hare and the Toad Wars! and was seeking a target audience in the 11 to 15-year-old range. The first 13 episodes were animated by Graz Entertainment while the remaining 52 episodes produced once the series went to daily syndication were produced by Jetlag Productions.

== Broadcast ==
In August 1992, it was reported that distributor Claster Television had sold the series in 103 markets. The series was broadcast in the United States via weekly syndication beginning September 12, 1992 with its initial 13 episodes, though in some markets it would premiere the following day on Sunday September 13. Beginning in 1993, the series entered daily syndication with an additional order of 52 episodes.

== Home releases ==
=== Region 2 ===
In 2000, home video distributor Maverick announced they had acquired the British home video rights to Sony Wonder's catalogue in the United Kingdom. The company released single VHS volume of the series in October 2000 containing the first two episodes of Series 1 - "The Night of Fiery Tears" and "Blood Brother".

In August 2004, Maximum Entertainment (Under license from Jetix Europe) released a single DVD containing four random episodes from the first season. In 2008, they released the entirety of Season 1 in a two-disc set with all the episodes uncut and in their original story order.

Force Entertainment released the complete series on DVD in Australia in Region 4 format in a series of 16 single-disc DVD volumes, with four episodes per disc, excluding episode 27 (A Needle in a Haystack) which is thankfully featured on the Region 1 Season 2 Part 2 DVD Release.

=== Region 1 ===
At least two VHS releases of the series were released in Canada by Malofilm.

In 2011, Shout! Factory began releasing the series on DVD in Region 1 for the very first time. To date, they have released season 1 as well as the first half of season 2 on DVD.

DVD name	Ep #	Release date
Season One	13	July 26, 2011
Season Two: Part 1	13	November 22, 2011
Season Two: Part 2	13	April 17, 2012
Season Two: Part 3	13	TBA
Season Two: Part 4	13	TBA

== Reception ==
The animated version was popular with fans and audiences alike, and also praised for staying largely true to Robert E. Howard's material, and was one of the most popular sword and sorcery cartoons alongside He-Man and Dungeons & Dragons. However, it did receive some criticism, for being more suitable to younger audience, removing the adult content and toning down the violence. According to The A.V. Club, this cartoon, like the other two Conan television series, "has been significantly defanged, dumbing down and infantilizing the character to the degree that he's robbed of his savage appeal".

== Spin-off ==
Following the conclusion of Conan the Adventurer, CBS premiered the spin-off Conan and the Young Warriors on March 5, 1994. In accordance with FCC mandated education requirements for children's programming, Conan's edges were further softened from Conan the Adventurer so he could serve as a mentor figure to his pupils The Barbarian Kids. When CBS ordered the series as a mid-season replacement for their 1993-94 Saturday morning schedule, the series was being developed under the title of Conan and the Barbarian Kids.

== See also ==
- Conan and the Young Warriors
