= Graz Entertainment =

American licensing and distribution company

Graz Entertainment (/ɡrɑːz/) was an American licensing and distribution company, run by Jim and Stephanie Graziano, which obtains and provides programming and licensing rights for children's television animation.

They currently control Z Blade, The Attic, Goliath, Tom Thumb, among others.

== List of licensed/distributed shows ==
- The Adventures of Corduroy (1996–1997, co-produced with Benjamin Productions, Lin Oliver Productions, and Viacom Productions, distributed by Paramount Television)
- Conan the Adventurer (1992, Season 1 only; co-produced with Sunbow Productions, distributed by Claster Television)
- Conan and the Young Warriors (1994, co-produced with Sunbow Productions, distributed by Claster Television)
- Darkstalkers (1995, co-produced with Capcom, distributed by The Summit Media Group)
- G.I. Joe Extreme (1995, co-produced with Sunbow Entertainment and Gunther-Wahl Productions, distributed by Claster Television)
- The Land Before Time II: The Great Valley Adventure (1994, co-produced with Universal Cartoon Studios, distributed by MCA/Universal Home Video
- My Little Pony Tales (1992, co-produced with Sunbow Productions, distributed by Claster Television)
- Ronin Warriors (1995, distributed by CINAR [Canada]/Claster Television [USA])
- Sgt. Savage and his Screaming Eagles (1994, co-produced with Sunbow Productions, distributed by Claster Television)
- Skeleton Warriors (1994–1995, co-production with Landmark Entertainment Group, distributed by Westinghouse Broadcasting International)
- Stone Protectors (1993, co-production with Sachs TV Entertainment)
- Street Fighter (1995, Season 1 only, co-produced with USA Studios and Capcom, distributed by ADV Films)
- The Tick (1994–1996, co-produced with Sunbow Productions and Fox Children's Productions, distributed by 20th Television)
- X-Men (1992–1997, co-produced with Saban Entertainment)

== See also ==
- Sunbow Productions
- MCA/Universal Studios
- The Summit Media Group
