= Eternity's Wheel =

Novel by Neil Gaiman, Michael Reaves, and Mallory Reaves

- First edition US cover
- Author: Neil Gaiman; Michael Reaves; Mallory Reaves
- Language: English
- Series: InterWorld
- Genre: Fantasy; Science fiction
- Publisher: HarperTeen, an imprint of HarperCollins Publishers
- Publication date: May 19, 2015
- Publication place: United States
- English publication date: 2015
- Pages: 288
- ISBN: 978-0-06-206799-9
- Preceded by: The Silver Dream

Eternity's Wheel is a 2015 fantasy and science fiction novel by Neil Gaiman, Michael Reaves and Mallory Reaves. It is the third novel in the InterWorld trilogy; previous volumes were the 2007 novel InterWorld and its 2013 sequel The Silver Dream. Eternity's Wheel was issued by HarperTeen, an imprint of HarperCollins Publishers, on May 19, 2015.

== Background ==
Eternity's Wheel credits the story to Neil Gaiman, Michael Reaves, and Mallory Reaves with a "written by" credit being assigned to Michael Reaves and Mallory Reaves. In a YouTube posting from April 2013, Gaiman explained that he met up with Reaves and Reaves (who are father and daughter) to plot out the third volume of the trilogy, but as with the previous volume in the InterWorld series, Gaiman's commitment to other projects prevented him from doing actual writing work on the book. The elder Reaves, meanwhile, has Parkinson's disease, and was therefore unable to actually perform much (if any) writing work. Consequently, Eternity's Wheel was essentially written in its entirety by Mallory Reaves, with story notes and editing advice from the two credited co-authors.
