= Aliens: Earth Hive =

1992 novel by Steve Perry

Earth Hive
- Author: Steve Perry
- Language: English
- Genre: Military science fiction, Science fiction horror
- Publisher: Bantam Books
- Publication date: 1992
- Publication place: United States
- Media type: Print (paperback)
- Pages: 278 pp
- ISBN: 0-553-56120-0
- OCLC: 26664081
- Followed by: Nightmare Asylum

Aliens: Earth Hive is a 1992 novel by Steve Perry, set in the fictional Alien movie universe. It is an adaptation of the story "Outbreak" which was the first in the Aliens comic book series, written by Mark Verheiden.

== Setting ==
It is the first book in a trilogy written by Perry, and deals with events on Earth and in other locations in space set a number of years after the movies Aliens and Alien 3. This book introduces two main characters, a Colonial Marine named Wilks, and a young woman named Billie, both survivors of a previous alien attack on the colony world of Rim.

== Plot summary ==
The book begins with a routine space junk cleanup mission in Earth orbit, with a small derelict spaceship being prepped for de-orbit and burnup. While a cleanup crew investigates, an alien xenomorph boards the Earth ship from the derelict and kills the crew. The clean-up ship gets destroyed but the black box survives.

A CIA-like organization, called the TIA, realizes the threat posed by the alien species, and is able to use the information in the black box to retrace the route of the derelict ship. A decision is made to send a Colonial Marine expedition to the origin planet of the derelict ship (presumably the home planet of the alien species). Wilks, a battle-hardened space marine, is picked for the job. He had encountered the aliens on the colony world of Rim, along with the only other survivor, a little girl named Billie. Wilks agrees to the mission, but first makes plans to break Billie out of a mental hospital, where she has been suffering from nightmares ever since her rescue from the aliens on Rim. On board the Colonial Marine ship, Billie begins a romantic relationship with a marine named Mitch while en route to the alien planet.

Meanwhile, greedy executives from the Weyland-Yutani corporation learn of the Colonial Marine expedition to the alien home planet, and make plans to intercept and destroy it. They hire a black-ops mercenary named Massey and his team of illegal combat synthetics, whose programming has been altered to permit the harming of human beings, in violation of the First Law of Robotics. It turns out that Weyland-Yutani already has a xenomorph specimen on Earth, and wishes to keep its monopoly on the species by preventing anyone else from obtaining a specimen.

A third group enters the fray, a religious cult that worships the xenomorph, and whose members believe that implantation by an alien facehugger is akin to joining with god. After the marine expedition leaves for the alien planet, followed by the mercenary ship, the cult locates the Weyland-Yutani lab holding the alien samples, breaks into the lab using suicidal attacks, and gets several members implanted by alien facehuggers.

After arriving at the alien planet, the Colonial Marine ship is ambushed by Massey and the combat synthetics, assisted by the leader of the Colonial Marine force, who betrayed them for money. After seizing control of the marines' vessel, Massey kills the traitorous leader, leaving Wilks and the rest of the marines captive. The mercenary reveals his plan to send the marines down to the planet, as bait for the aliens, and then use the combat synthetics to collect marines who'd been implanted by facehuggers. All of the marines except for Wilkes are sent down to the planet, unarmed, with the mercenary combat synthetics keeping a close watch.

On the planet, the first team of marines, including Mitch, is forced to enter an alien hive. Before the aliens can come out and attack, the mercenary synthetics who are keeping guard are attacked by a different hostile alien species. The Colonial Marines take advantage of this situation, killing the mercenary synthetics and taking their weapons.

During the surprise attack on the Colonial Marine vessel, Billie avoided detection in the initial sweep of the ship, and her name is not listed on the crew roster. She manages to kill one of the mercenary synthetics, get a weapon, and make her way to the bridge where Wilks and Massey are located. The two fight Massey and kill him.

On the planet, another group of marines is captured by a nearby alien hive. The surviving marines, led by Mitch, have no choice but to attempt a rescue, which costs them greatly; only a few marines manage to escape alive. Wilks and Billie fly down in a dropship to pick up the surviving marines, when Mitch is apparently killed by an alien – only to be revealed as a synthetic; the Colonial Marine force included a team of synthetics so accurate that they could completely pass as humans. Billie is devastated at this revelation, as she did not know Mitch was synthetic.

Mitch and the rest of the marines make it into the dropship, just as a horde of aliens start to swarm over the ship and try to break in. The ship cannot take off, and Wilkes is about to undertake a suicide mission by going outside to clear the aliens off, when all of the aliens are suddenly killed. A new alien appears, looking something like a giant elephant. Though the characters are unaware, this new alien is the same species of creature whose crashed ship the crew of the Nostromo encountered on LV-426 in the original Alien film – the so-called "Space Jockey." The Space Jockey does not appear hostile or particularly interested in the humans, as it returns to its spaceship without making contact with Wilkes. The remaining crew of the Colonial Marine expedition – Wilks, Billie, Mitch, a marine named Blake, and a naval crewman named Parks – return to their ship and head for Earth.

On Earth, the alien cult has broken into the Weyland-Yutani biowarfare lab containing the alien specimen, and has released wild aliens onto the planet. The aliens are slowly taking over, despite the best efforts of Earth's defensive forces. Over a period of several months, the aliens dominate the planet so completely that most humans have been killed, while the rest have evacuated to earth orbit or other planets. As Wilks, Billie, Mitch, Blake, and Parks return to Earth, the last organized survivors of Earth are preparing to leave; upon landing, a group of military survivors approach them, demanding that they hand over their ship. The encounter turns violent: Blake is killed and Parks panics and abandons the group. Wilks, Billie, and Mitch manage to stow away on a container ship headed for an unknown destination. They escape from Earth, with no idea of their final destination.

== Connections ==
The book is a novelization of the first series of the Aliens spin-off comic book (called Book One in the original trade paperback) written by Mark Verheiden which was released in 1989. At the time the comics formed a natural extension of the story as it was left at the end of the film Aliens.

However, the novel was released as a tie-in with Alien 3 (1992) which took the story off in another direction. To avoid any confusion that might arise, the characters' names were changed, so Hicks and Newt became Wilks and Billie, respectively. Other minor characters were also renamed.

When Book One was 'remastered' in 1996 and re-released as Outbreak the panels were colored and, to bring it in line with the revised story as presented in Earth Hive, the characters were renamed and references to LV-426 were changed to the colony world of Rim.

== Publication ==
- Aliens: Earth Hive (by Steve Perry, Bantam, 1992, ISBN 0-553-56120-0, Gollancz, 1993, ISBN 1-85798-139-1)
