= List of Conan the Adventurer episodes =

The following is a list of episodes for the 1992 animated television show Conan the Adventurer.

== Series overview ==
Series	Episodes	Originally released	
Series	Episodes	First released	Last released
1	13	13 September 1992	6 December 1992
2	52	13 September 1993	23 November 1993

== Episodes ==
=== Season 1 (1992) ===
No. overall	No. in season	Title	Written by	Original release date
1	1	"The Night of Fiery Tears"	Christy Marx	13 September 1992
In a village in Cimmeria, a meteor shower occurs. The meteorites are made of an unusual metal. The village collects the meteorites so a blacksmith can forge tools and weapons. Among the items forged is a sword made for Conan, the blacksmith's son, and placed under a large stone until he is strong enough to lift it and claim the weapon. Eventually, Wrath-Amon, a Stygian high priest, arrives at the village. He is denied the Starmetal and has his men ravage the village before turning Conan's parents and grandfather into statues. Conan fetches his sword and dispatches Wrath-Amon's soldiers before Wrath-Amon escapes and vows to destroy Conan. Vowing to undo the spell of living stone and vanquish Wrath-Amon, Conan tames a wild horse and names him Thunder. Conan then meets the ghost of Epimetrius the sage at his tomb within Mt. Golameir. To aid Conan in destroying the black ring in Wrath-Amon's possession, Epimetrius gives him a shield that was used by a King of Atlantis and that holds Needle, a baby Phoenix. Arriving at a village soon after, Conan looks for a job but is drugged and sold to Stygian slave ship bound for the slave pits of Wrath-Amon.
2	2	"Blood Brother"	Christy Marx	20 September 1992
After being sold into slavery, Conan meets Prince Zula of Wasai and learns they are to build a second pyramid in addition to the one in Stygia. Zula became enslaved when he was ambushed while being told by his cousin Prince Gora of a slaver raid on a nearby village. Needle attempts to free Conan and steal the guard's keys but is captured by the ship's captain, who is a Serpent Man. Upon arriving at the slave camp, Conan refuses to kneel before the monster and then learns that Wrath-Amon is immune to Starmetal due to the black ring. Conan and Zula convince the starving prisoners to revolt. As the slaves hijack the slave ships, Conan goes off to find his sword, which is being melted down by Wrath-Amon to make Starmetal discs. During the fight, Zula acquires Starmetal bolas to hold Wrath-Amon off as Conan regains his sword and pushes Wrath-Amon into the blast furnace before he and his allies flee the camp toward Wasai. Arriving before Gora is crowned, Zula requests for Conan to become his blood brother and thus second in line to the throne of Wasai. This vexes Gora, who is actually an agent of Wrath-Amon.
3	3	"Star of Shadizar"	Christy Marx	27 September 1992
Conan and Zula journey to Shadizar to find the Star of Transmutation, a powerful magical jewel that might help Conan break the curse on his family. On the way they meet a mysterious and beautiful circus performer named Jezmine who might help them on their quest.
4	4	"Conan the Gladiator"	Buzz Dixon	4 October 1992
When Conan and Jezmine are given the news that Zula has been captured by cannibals and is presumed dead, Conan vows to find his Blood Brother.
5	5	"The Heart of Rakkir"	Roy Thomas; Carla Conway	11 October 1992
Wrath-Amon has discovered the location of the Heart of Rakkir, which will give him the power over a sea monster. He finds out that only a person with Atlantean blood may acquire the jewel. Luckily for Conan, he is the descendant of the Atlanteans.
6	6	"Men of Stone"	Roger Slifer	18 October 1992
When Wrath-Amon enslaves a village and turns their chief to stone, Conan goes to investigate the matter and learns the secret behind the curse, but will it cost him his friends?.
7	7	"The Terrible Torrinon"	Lloyd Goldfine	25 October 1992
Conan, Jezmine and Snagg ride into a town shunned by locals as being "cursed". While there, they see a woman being carried away by an evil wizard, feared as the Terrible Torrinon. The adventuring trio mount a rescue, only to find that they have been deceived by a clever ploy of the villagers. Unfortunately, Wrath-amon too has been deceived, and he arrives to challenge Torrinon to a sorcerer's duel.
8	8	"Greywolf of Xanthus"	Katherine Lawrence	1 November 1992
Conan, Jezmine and Zula journey to Xanthus, the ancient city of wizards, to look for a way to break the stone curse that Wrath-Amon placed on Conan's family.
9	9	"Shadow Walkers"	Larry DiTillio	8 November 1992
Conan and Greywolf are in the city of Phenion when they are attacked by a gang of ninjas. The ninjas explain that they are the Silent Dragons and need his help. Conan agrees and the ninjas offer to teach him how to be a ninja.
10	10	"The Claw of Heaven"	Bridget McKenna	15 November 1992
Conan and Greywolf hear of a tribe of Picts (primitives) whose shaman/tribal leader wields a staff with a piece of Star Metal forged in the shape of a claw upon it (the Claw of Heaven of the title) this specially forged Star Metal amplifies magical power, so the duo must both persuade the Picts to give them the Claw and protect it from Mesmira and Skulkur.
11	11	"The Serpent Riders of Set"	Doug Booth	22 November 1992
Conan, Jezmine and Snagg are travelling through a forest when they come across a band of warriors led by a youth, the ruler of the local land who was recently ousted by Wrath-Amon and his Serpent Men. Wrath-Amon captures the castle and a mystical tomb of the Serpent Riders of Set, seven mystical "horsemen" who served Set eons ago and who can be resurrected. Conan and the others agree to help the youth regain his castle.
12	12	"Windfang's Eyrie"	Christy Marx	29 November 1992
Windfang, under Wrath-Amon's orders, kidnaps Jezmine and imprisons her in his lair. As Conan comes to her rescue, the deformed Windfang reveals his previous existence as a normal human to Jezmine.
13	13	"Seven Against Stygia"	Larry DiTillio	6 December 1992
Wrath-Amon is about to complete a second pyramid and come much closer to freeing his master Set. Conan and Zula discover this and call on the rest of their comrades so they may prevent it from happening.

=== Season 2 (1993) ===
No. overall	No. in season	Title	Written by	Original release date
14	1	"Tribal Warfare"	Jean Chalopin; Doug Booth	13 September 1993
When Snagg's tribesmen, the Vanirmen, are attacked by what appears to be Cimmerians (Conan's tribe), Conan and Snagg's friendship is tested. To complicate the matter further, men who appear to be Vanirmen attack the Cimmerians. This escalates to war between the two tribes and between two friends.
15	2	"Curse of Ahx' oon"	Jean Chalopin; Katherine Lawrence	14 September 1993
Conan and Zula must deliver the mask of Ahx' oon to the Wasai, ancient enemies of the Orashawa, as payment from Gora so he may be made their king. Conan and Zula are skeptical but agree to the task, for it may deliver peace to the two kingdoms - or it may deliver danger.
16	3	"The Master Thief of Shadizar"	Jean Chalopin; Christy Marx	15 September 1993
Conan and Jezmine team up with an arrogant and notorious thief to plunder a wizard's tower, but trouble arises when the wizard turns out to be an old enemy of theirs.
17	4	"The Vengeance of Jhebbal Sag"	Jean Chalopin; George Bloom	16 September 1993
Zula performs a magical ritual that calls the spirit Jhebbel Sag, Master of Beasts, into the material world. Wrath-Amon captures Jhebbel Sag and traps him, then uses his dark magic to corrupt the spirit into a being of evil.
18	5	"The Red Brotherhood"	Jean Chalopin; Katherine Lawrence	17 September 1993
Conan and Snagg are in Toran when a female pirate named Valeria helps them escape a group of soldiers who started a fight with two of them. She wants the pair to join her crew the Red Brotherhood. Conan and Snagg are hesitant, but eventually agree.
19	6	"Thunder and Lightning"	Jean Chalopin; Richard Mueller	20 September 1993
Conan is becoming more frustrated with Thunder's free-willed nature. They soon reach the city of Ranoako, where they find weapons similar to what Conan's father made and ask where the blacksmith duplicated it. He tells them he copied it from a blacksmith named Morgo. On the way there, Thunder meets a female and decides to meet her. This drives Conan angry and he decides to let Thunder go luckily they meet another horse which Conan decides to become master of and names it Lightning. Has Conan found a permanent horse?.
20	7	"The Crevasse of Winds"	Jean Chalopin; Carla Conway	21 September 1993
In search of the mystical Book of Skelos, which may hold the secret to releasing Conan's family from Wrath-Amon's Spell of Living Stone, Conan, Greywolf and Falkenar climb to the infamous Crevasse of Winds, where they discover that the Book has a guardian; a tainted adult Phoenix. Problems arise over precisely where Needle's loyalties lie; with the Phoenix, or with his friends?.
21	8	"Hanuman the Ape God"	Jean Chalopin; Bridget McKenna	22 September 1993
Conan and Jezmine find a magical golden city in the middle of the desert ruled by a man with a magic rod. This entire city seems to worship an ape-god (Hanuman) who crashed to the earth in a big rock, bringing the magic rod with him. When checking the rock to make sure it isn't star metal, Conan and Jezmine find that Hanuman is a prisoner, and free him, giving him back his magic rod.
22	9	"Isle of the Naiads"	Jean Chalopin; Marv Wolfman	23 September 1993
Conan and Snagg are in deep trouble after a visit to the mysterious "Isle of the Naiads", home to magical spirits of water, trees and stone, results in them losing their strength to the enchanted waters of weakness. Especially seeing as how Wrath-amon and Windfang are now laying siege to the island!
23	10	"In Days of Old"	Jean Chalopin; George Bloom	24 September 1993
Conan, and Jezmine travel to village where they are meant to rendezvous with Greywolf. When they arrive he is nowhere to be found. Until his siblings Sasah and Misha lead them to him. They find him apparently drained of his youth. He tells them that he journeyed to the mountains to find a Sorcerer. The Sorcerer used his magic to take his youth and left him to die. Conan and Jezmine decide to pay a visit to the Sorcerer but will they suffer the same fate as their friend?.
24	11	"Birth of Wrath-Amon"	Jean Chalopin; George Bloom	27 September 1993
Conan, Zula and Falconer travel to the mountains, and find the Spellbinder. They ask him to break the curse on Conans family but he refuses. Through some bargaining from Conan, he provides a solution; to send Conan back in time before the spell happened. Conan agrees and is sent through a portal, but the place he arrives seems different and Wrath-Amon is nowhere to be found.
25	12	"Earthbound"	Jean Chalopin; Richard Merwin	28 September 1993
Windfang tired of being Wrath-Amon's unwilling henchmen steals a spell that can take him to queen Fridgia to mystic Askaloon where he can break his curse. He kidnaps Jezmine because he needs a witness and they break the curse. Wrath-Amon learns of this and decides to take vengeance against his former slave.
26	13	"The Treachery of Emperors"	Jean Chalopin; Roger Slifer	29 September 1993
The Princess of Vendhya has been abducted by Sarenshaw the leader of the hooded ones. The emperor promises that whoever saves his daughter shall be made king of the western province. Fortunately, Conan is in Vendhya and hears the proposal, and agrees to save the princess so he may become a king.
27	14	"A Needle in a Haystack"	Jean Chalopin; George Bloom	30 September 1993
28	15	"Return to Tarantia"	Jean Chalopin; Doug Booth	1 October 1993
29	16	"The Book of Skelos"	Jean Chalopin	4 October 1993
Conan, Jezmine and Zula, in search of the second Book of Skelos (the first having been destroyed in the "Crevasse of Winds"), enter an ancient ruin that leads to a nightmarish, labyrinthine pocket dimension controlled by a monstrous demon called Evillak.
30	17	"Labors of Conan"	Jean Chalopin	5 October 1993
Conan, Jezmine and Greywolf are traveling by the mountains when they are attacked by Serpentmen. Zulanti, a wizard, comes to their aid and helps them drive away the Serpentmen. Zulanti quickly shows his power to the group and they are quite impressed. Conan is impressed even more when Zulanti breaks the stone curse on a group of people. Conan soon believes that he may have found the answer to help his family.
31	18	"The Amulet of Vathelos"	Jean Chalopin	6 October 1993
Conan travels to Stygia where he insults some demon-worshippers in a large city. He walks away from that encounter to eventually meet a man whose friend has been turned into stone by the same demon. This man knew Conan's grandfather when he was young and we hear the entire story of how Conan's grandfather stole the amulet of Vathelos.
32	19	"Final Hours of Conan"	Jean Chalopin	7 October 1993
A false trail instigated by Wrath-Amon leads to Conan being stung by a hideous imp created by the evil sorcerer. To the group's horror, the sting slowly starts turning Conan into a Serpent-Man; can they find a cure or will they lose their friend to Wrath-Amon's control?.
33	20	"An Evil Wind in Kusan"	Jean Chalopin	8 October 1993
Falconer is captured by Windfang and Yin Doo, a native of Kusan exiled for his ties to Set. They force Falconer to don a cursed mantle that transforms him into the demon Harock who then attacks Kusan. The only hope for Kusan's survival is a "Duel of Champions", where Harock will battle Kusan's champion, determined by the fact they must wear the Mantle of Winds. Unfortunately, the only one with the blood able to do so is a weak scholarly lad. Can Conan teach the lad how to fight well enough to defeat a demon?. Will they be able to discover Falconer's fate and save him from Harock?.
34	21	"Blood of my Blood"	Jean Chalopin	11 October 1993
Conan, Jezmine and Greywolf travel to the Temple of Tomes to research how to break the spell of living stone, and it is revealed that Conan is unable to read. As Jezmine attempts to teach the barbarian, he finds a barbarian much like himself, only this fellow is unable to speak very well. The evil Mesmira learns of their presence and begins a nasty plan of her own.
35	22	"Dragon's Breath"	Jean Chalopin	12 October 1993
Conan returns to Phenion, when his master Dong Hee tells him that he may have found a way to help him. He tells Conan that he may find the answer from an old friend the Kari Dragon.
36	23	"The Queen of Stygia"	Jean Chalopin	13 October 1993
Things get rough, when on the way to stop the building of one of Wrath-Amon's pyramids, Conan is tricked and enchanted by Mesmira and turned against his friends. Can they set him free or will they all meet their doom?.
37	24	"Nature of the Beast"	Jean Chalopin	14 October 1993
Mesmira captures Sasha, and using a wicked spell, transforms herself into a copy of her, planting bait to lure Conan and his friends into a trap and steal their star-metal weapons. It is up to Sasha to escape and warn the others of the imposter before it is too late.
38	25	"City of the Burning Skull"	Jean Chalopin	15 October 1993
Conan and his friends find a mysterious city with a struggle going on between the city's last people and a diabolical sorcerer who needs their bodies to continue his life.
39	26	"Son of Atlantis"	Jean Chalopin	18 October 1993
Wrath-Amon finds a magical horn that controls the people of Atlantis, the Cimmerians, with the blood of Atlantis flowing through their veins, are called to Stygia by the horn's power, will Conan defeat Wrath-Amon's plot or are the people of Cimmeria doomed?.
40	27	"Conn Rides Again"	Jean Chalopin	19 October 1993
Mesmira summons Conan to her boat, claiming she will undo the spell of living stone cast on Conan's family, meanwhile, Conn and Greywolf plot to stop Mesmira.
41	28	"Down to the Dregs"	Jean Chalopin	20 October 1993
Needle and Dregs are forced to team up to escape an evil collector of rare animals.
42	29	"Dregs-Amon the Great"	Jean Chalopin	21 October 1993
Chaos ensues when a new ruler takes control of Stygia. All hail, Dregs-Amon the Great!?.
43	30	"The Wolfmother"	Jean Chalopin	22 October 1993
Conan and Greywolf travel to an unnamed country of frost, when Sasha and Misha run away, Greywolf goes in search of them and vanishes, Conan goes to a nearby lodge to solicit the aid of its residents. Meanwhile, a mysterious woman teaches Greywolf to understand the plight of his siblings, will they be lost to their wild instincts forever or will they follow Greywolf?.
44	31	"Conan of the Kosaki"	Jean Chalopin	25 October 1993
Crossing the sea to a distant kingdom whose king ms enslaving his people to construct one of the stone pyramids that will release, Set, Conan, Jezmine and Snagg are thrown into prison for their troubles. Escaping to join forces with the renegade Kosaki, Conan and Snagg must learn to stop their "playful" fighting in order to inspire the Kosaki to cease squabbling amongst themselves.
45	32	"Torrinon Returns"	Jean Chalopin; Katherine Lawrence	26 October 1993
The diminutive and incompetent magician Torrinon frantically summons Conan, Snagg and Jezmine for assistance after he accidentally provokes Wrath-amon's wrath with a magical prank.
46	33	"The Frost-Giant's Daughter"	Jean Chalopin	27 October 1993
Eager to win the heart of a fiery warrior woman, Snagg brings Conan along into the wilds in search of a flower from the garden of Atali, the Frost Giant's Daughter. But will they find more than they bargained for?.
47	34	"Cornucopia of Grondar"	Jean Chalopin	28 October 1993
Conan and friends seek the lost Cornucopia of Grondar, a mystical horn of plenty with the ability to create any object. But when the horn falls into Wrath-Amon's hands, will they be able to stop him before he creates enough star-metal to free Set?.
48	35	"When Tolls the Bell of Night"	Jean Chalopin	29 October 1993
Yin Doo enlists the aid of Windfang to free an evil demon of fear and darkness imprisoned in ancient times. But when the demon turns out to be more powerful than they thought, an unlikely alliance may have to be made to vanquish the beast.
49	36	"The Last Dagger of Manir"	Jean Chalopin	1 November 1993
Conan and his allies land in the pirate city Tortage, where Conan soon lands them in some deep trouble. Now Conan must convince a greedy pirate captain of the power of star-metal and the danger of Set before he and his friends are handed over to Wrath-Amon!.
50	37	"Thorns of Midnight"	Jean Chalopin	2 November 1993
Conan and Greywolf finally manage to track down some lycanthrus flowers to return Sasha and Misha to normal, but it looks like they have competition; Mesmira is after the plants as well!.
51	38	"The Vale of Amazons"	Jean Chalopin; Katherine Lawrence	3 November 1993
Conan is taken prisoner by the Amazons and made a slave, and it is up to Jezmine to defeat the treacherous queen of the Amazons and rescue her friend.
52	39	"Bones of Damballa"	Jean Chalopin	4 November 1993
Fearing he is to be replaced, Wrath-amon sends Skulkar to assassinate his potential replacement, a shaman named Shadizar – who happens to be an old enemy of Skulkar's. However, things go wrong and Shadizar turns Skulkar back into his original human form. With no other choice, Skulkar must team up with Conan and Zula to restore himself to his undead form.
53	40	"Turn About is Foul Play"	Jean Chalopin; Katherine Lawrence	5 November 1993
When a new queen is revealed to be a Serpent-Woman, she tricks the king into imprisoning Conan and Zula. Now Conan and Zula, facing execution, must escape and put the treacherous snake's plans to an end!.
54	41	"Once & Future Conan"	Jean Chalopin	8 November 1993
Conan goes to a mysterious garden to find a cure for the spell of living stone, the meeting is actually an ambush set by Wrath-Amon, Conan is pulled into the future right before he is slain by a giant serpent. The person who pulled him into the future turns out to be a much older Greywolf, he tells Conan of the future that will occur because Conan was killed in the garden by the giant serpent's venom, he must quest through the horrible new world to obtain the cure to the poison and save the future.
55	42	"The Sword of Destiny"	Jean Chalopin	9 November 1993
A brash, foolhardy kid steals Conan's sword and goes off heedlessly to confront Wrath-Amon and prove himself as great a hero as Conan.
56	43	"Sword, Sai & Shuriken"	Jean Chalopin	9 November 1993
Conan is asked to return to Phenion to face an unstoppable warrior who has defeated every ninja in Phenion. Will Conan suffer the same fate?.
57	44	"Full Moon Rising"	Jean Chalopin; Katherine Lawrence	10 November 1993
Greywolf and Conan thwart the attempt of a rogue wizard to steal forbidden knowledge, resulting in his expulsion from Xanthus. Vowing revenge on Greywolf, he teams up with Mesmira, with devastating effect. Can Conan, Sasha and Misha to mount a rescue before the full moon is over?.
58	45	"The Stealer of Souls"	Jean Chalopin	11 November 1993
Wrath-Amon uses the black ring to summon The Stealer of Souls, a large, insect like creature that can absorb human souls and gives control of it to Gora. He then summons the beast to consume the souls of his cousin, Zula, his uncle, and Conan. Will the heroes escape or spend eternity trapped in the lair of the Stealer of Souls?.
59	46	"Amra the Lion"	Jean Chalopin	12 November 1993
Gora uleashes his revenge against Conan and Zula. Will the heroes escape or have they met their doom.
60	47	"Escape of Ram-Amon"	Jean Chalopin	15 November 1993
On a quest to destroy Wrath-Amon, Conan finds the long-imprisoned Ram-Amon, predecessor of Wrath-Amon and sets him free, the two then team up to destroy Wrath-Amon.
61	48	"The Star Metal Monster"	Jean Chalopin	16 November 1993
In search of friendship, a young orphan girl with innate sorcerous powers breathes life into a grotesque metal statue. Dubbing the extremely protective beast "Titainus", she feels safe at last. Unfortunately for her; the statue was forged entirely from star-metal, which means that her new friend has earned the attentions of Wrath-amon!.
62	49	"Into the Abyss"	Jean Chalopin; Christy Marx	17 November 1993
After a tentative meeting with Ram-Amon to discuss the Amulet of Vathelos, Conan discovers that the Amulet needs to be recharged with some of Set's own dark magic. The result of this is that Conan and Jezmine undertake a perilous quest into the Abyss. Surrounded by hostile Serpent-Men, against which their star-metal weapons now have no effect, can the two make it out alive?.
63	50	"A Serpent Coils the Earth, Episode I"	Jean Chalopin	18 November 1993
Wrath-Amon finishes the building of the pyramids required to open the Gates of Eternity and bring the evil Set back to Earth. After destroying the city of Shushan, Set and his army go to the north, bringing fear to everyone.
64	51	"A Serpent Coils the Earth, Episode II"	Jean Chalopin	19 November 1993
The battle rages on as Set invades Tarantia, being opposed by many of Conan's friends and allies. Meanwhile, Conan and his grandfather, Conn, go to Galamira Mountain and the tomb of Epimetrius, who informs them of how to defeat Set. Later, Conan and his allies must reluctantly trust Mesmira if they are to succeed in infiltrating Wrath-Amon's stronghold. Once inside, a battle ensues for the control of the fortress, and hope seems to be fading as the evil wizard gains the upper hand on our heroes, but then, the Amulet of Vathelos becomes fully energized, enabling Conan to revert Wrath-Amon to an ordinary gila monster. After destroying the Black Ring, Conan uses the Amulet of Vathelos to restore his mother and father to normal. But as our heroes celebrate their victory, no one notices Mesmira as she retrieves the melted remains of the Black Ring.
65	52	"A Serpent Coils the Earth, Episode III"	Jean Chalopin	23 November 1993
Conan and his friends succeed in closing the Abyss by destroying the Star-Metal Disc atop Wrath-Amon's fortress, but then, Ram-Amon reveals himself, captures our heroes, and assumes the role of second-in-command due to Wrath-Amon's defeat. As Set prepares to do away with his enemies, some unlikely allies are able to muster up the courage to stand up to Set and free his hostages. In the end, Set is banished back to the Abyss, and the war finally ends - or does it?
