= The Cold Forge =

1. REDIRECT List of Alien (franchise) novels#Further novels
