= The Silver Dream =

Book by Neil Gaiman, Michael Reaves and Mallory Reaves

- Cover of The Silver Dream
- Author: Neil Gaiman, Michael Reaves, Mallory Reaves
- Language: English
- Genre: Fantasy, science fiction
- Publisher: HarperTeen, an imprint of HarperCollins Publishers
- Publication date: April 23, 2013
- Publication place: United States
- English publication date: 2013
- ISBN: 978-0-06-206796-8
- Preceded by: InterWorld
- Followed by: Eternity's Wheel

The Silver Dream is a fantasy and science fiction novel by Neil Gaiman, Michael Reaves and Mallory Reaves. It is a sequel to the 2007 novel InterWorld, and was published in 2013.

== Summary ==
The Silver Dream continues the story of Joey Harker, a seemingly ordinary teenager who discovered he has the ability to travel between parallel dimensions. Together with a group of other Joeys from different Earths in other parallel universes, Joey and the InterWorld team try to stop the forces of magic (known as HEX) and science (known as Binary) from forcibly taking over all of the Earths in different universes.

In this novel, Joey continues to struggle to find his place within the InterWorld organization, as he is still blamed for the death of a popular team member. As the team begins to lose more and more ground to Hex and Binary, Joey encounters a mysterious young woman named Acacia Jones, whose powers to jump between dimensions seem to rival or even exceed his own—and who may not be working for the same ends that he is.

== Background ==
The book credits the story to Neil Gaiman and Michael Reaves, with a "written by" credit being assigned to Michael Reaves and Mallory Reaves. In a YouTube posting from April 2013, Gaiman explained that he had wanted to write a sequel to Interworld for some time, but was committed to too many other projects. Initially, Gaiman and Michael Reaves plotted out the story for The Silver Dream, and Reaves went away to do the actual writing. However, Reaves, who has Parkinson's disease, was unable to actually perform much (if any) work on the book; instead, he turned over the writing to his daughter Mallory, who completed the novel based on the outline worked up by Gaiman and the elder Reaves. According to an overview of The Silver Dream on Gaiman's website, "Mallory would write, Michael would edit, Neil would invite them out for sushi and introduce a major plot twist like 'Let's strand him in the future!' or 'There's a traitor in their midst!'"

In the same April 2013 video, Gaiman also revealed that all three writers had already met to plot out a third InterWorld novel, and that Joey's adventures would continue. The third book, Eternity's Wheel, was released in the spring of 2015.
