= Steve Perry (author) =

American television writer and science fiction author

- Born: August 31, 1947 (age 79); Baton Rouge, Louisiana
- Occupation: SF/Comic book/Television writer
- Children: S. D. Perry
- Writing career
- Notable works: Matador series, Star Wars: Death Star, Star Wars: Shadows of the Empire novel
- Website: www.soulofacarp.com/sperry/

Steve Perry (born August 31, 1947) is an American television writer and science fiction author.

== Biography ==
Perry is a native of the Deep South. His residences have included Louisiana, California, Washington, and Oregon. Prior to working full-time as a freelance writer, he worked as a swimming instructor, lifeguard, assembler of toys, a clerk in a hotel gift shop and car rental agency, aluminum salesman, martial art instructor, private detective, and nurse. His wife is Dianne Waller, a Port of Portland executive. They have two children and five grandsons. One of their children is science fiction author S. D. Perry.

He is a practitioner of the martial art Silat, which inspired him to create the fictional martial arts Sumito and Teräs Käsi, both of which are essentially fictionalized versions of Silat.

== Literary career ==
Perry has written over fifty novels and numerous short stories, which have appeared in various magazines and anthologies. Perry is perhaps best known for the Matador series. He has written books in the Star Wars, Alien and Conan universes. He was a collaborator on all of the Tom Clancy's Net Force series, seven of which have appeared on the New York Times Bestseller list. Two of his novelizations, Star Wars: Shadows of the Empire and Men in Black have also been bestsellers. Other writing credits include articles, reviews, and essays, animated teleplays, and some unproduced movie scripts. One of his scripts for Batman: The Animated Series was an Emmy Award nominee for Outstanding Writing.

Perry is a member of the Science Fiction and Fantasy Writers of America, The Animation Guild, and the Writers Guild of America, West.

== Published works ==
- Dome with J. Michael Reaves (1987) – present-day end of the world, prequel to Matador series in that it mentions spetsdöds
- The Mask (novelization of The Mask) (1994)
- Trinity Vector (1996)
- The Digital Effect (1997)
- Men in Black (1998 Novelization)
- Time Was: Isaac Asimov's I-BOTS with Gary Braunbeck (1998)
- Titan A.E. (2000 Novelization) with Dal Perry
- Windowpane (2003)

=== Matador series ===
The Matador series chronicles the birth, evolution, victory, and aftermath of a rebellion that overthrows a corrupt and declining interstellar government. The series features a fictional martial art known as "Sumito" or "The 97 Steps".

1. The Man Who Never Missed (1985)
2. Matadora (1986)
3. The Machiavelli Interface (1986)
4. The Omega Cage with J. Michael Reaves (1988)
5. The 97th Step (1989)
6. The Albino Knife (1991)
7. Black Steel (1992)
8. Brother Death (1992)
9. The Musashi Flex (2006)
10. Churl (2023)

=== Conan series ===
1. Conan the Fearless (1986)
2. Conan the Defiant (1987)
3. Conan the Indomitable (1989)
4. Conan the Free Lance (1990)
5. Conan the Formidable (1990)

=== Star Wars ===
1. Shadows of the Empire (1996)
2. Shadows of the Empire: Evolution (2000)

==== Star Wars MedStar ====
- MedStar I: Battle Surgeons with Michael Reaves (2004)
- MedStar II: Jedi Healer with Michael Reaves (2004)

==== Star Wars Death Star ====
- Death Star with Michael Reaves (2007)

=== Aliens ===
1. Aliens: Earth Hive (1992)
2. Aliens: Nightmare Asylum (1993)
3. Aliens: The Female War with Stephani Perry (1993)

==== Aliens vs. Predator ====
1. Prey with Stephani Perry (1994)
2. Hunter's Planet with David Bischoff (1994)

==== Predator ====
1. Turnabout (2008)

=== Tom Clancy's Net Force ===
(created by Tom Clancy and Steve Pieczenik)

1. Breaking Point (2000)
2. Point of Impact (2001)
3. Cybernation (2001)
4. State of War (2003)
5. Changing of the Guard (2003)
6. Springboard with Larry Segriff
7. The Archimedes Effect with Larry Segriff (2006)

=== Leonard Nimoy's Primortals ===
1. Target Earth (1997)

=== Star Risk ===
1. Chris Bunch's The Gangster Conspiracy with Dal Perry (2007)

=== Stellar Ranger ===
1. Stellar Ranger (1994)
2. Lone Star (1994)

=== Time Machine ===
1. Sword of the Samurai with J. Michael Reaves (1984)
2. Civil War Secret Agent (1984)

=== Venture Silk ===
1. Spindoc (1994)
2. The Forever Drug (1995)

=== Indiana Jones ===
- Indiana Jones and the Army of the Dead (2009)

=== Thong ===
1. Thong the Barbarian Meets the Cycle Sluts of Saturn (1998) with J. Michael Reaves

=== Cutter's Wars ===
1. The Ramal Extraction (2012)
2. The Vastalimi Gambit (2013)
3. The Tejano Conflict (2014)

=== The Void series ===
1. The Void Fighter (2024)
2. The Void Vixen (2024)
3. The Void Child (2025)

== Television ==
- The Centurions (1986)
- The Real Ghostbusters (1987)
- Spiral Zone (1987)
- Starcom: The U.S. Space Force (1987)
- Batman: The Animated Series (1992–1995)
- Conan and the Young Warriors (1994)
- Gargoyles (1995)
- Street Fighter (1996)
- Extreme Ghostbusters (1997)
- Godzilla: The Series (1998)
- Spider-Man Unlimited (1999–2000)
