= Michael Reaves =

American writer (1950–2023)

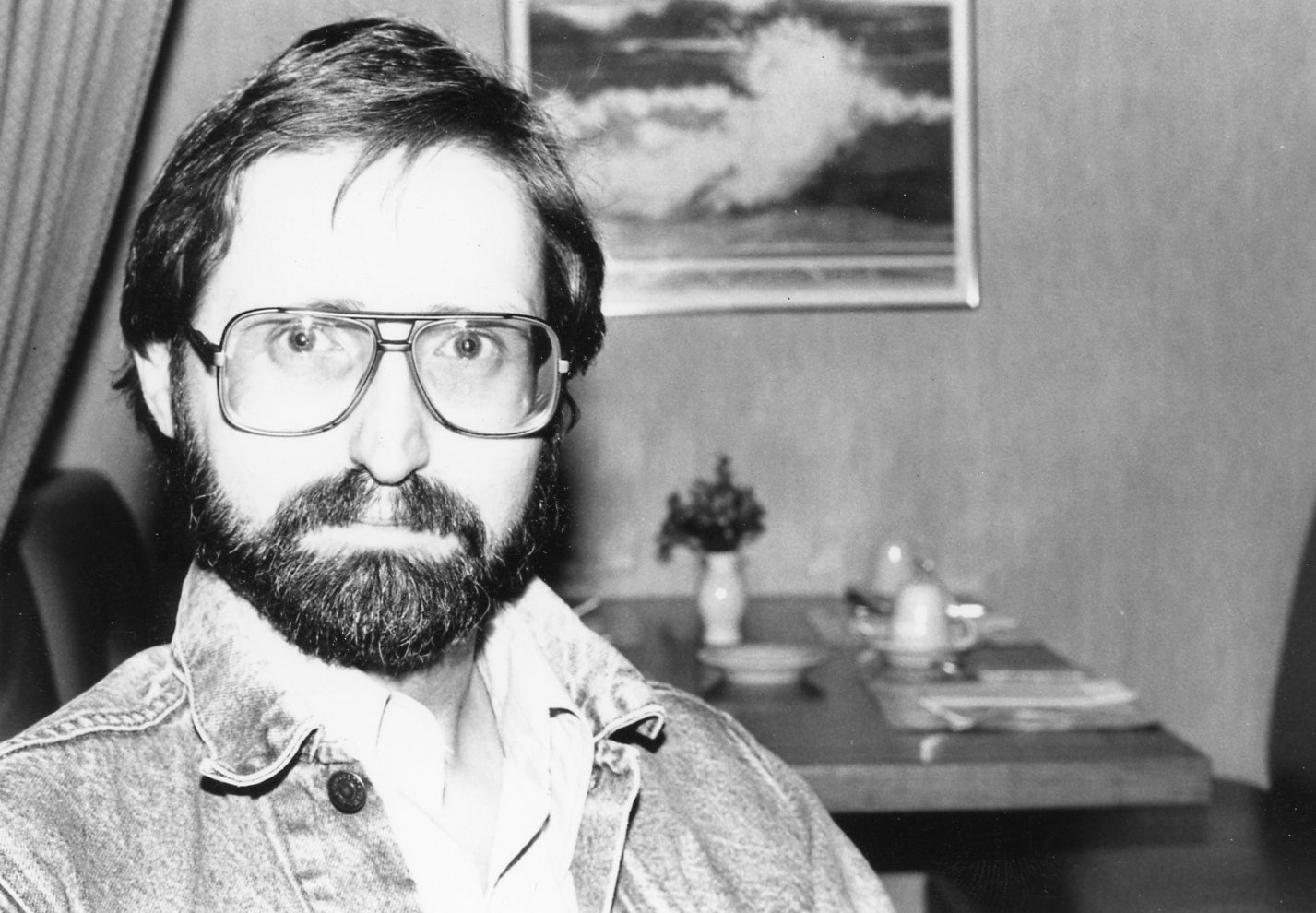
- Reaves in 1990
- Born: James Michael Reaves; September 14, 1950; San Bernardino, California, U.S.
- Died: March 20, 2023 (aged 72); Los Angeles, California, U.S.
- Other name: J. Michael Reaves
- Occupation: Writer
- Years active: 1973–2015

James Michael Reaves (September 14, 1950 – March 20, 2023) was an American writer, known for his contributions as a script writer and story editor to a number of 1980s and 1990s animated television series, including Gargoyles and Batman: The Animated Series. He also wrote media tie-in novels, children's books, and original fiction, and was one of four credited screenwriters for the animated feature Batman: Mask of the Phantasm. His work was often done collaboratively, notably with his then-wife Brynne Stephens (for numerous TV episodes in the 1980s and 1990s), and with Steve Perry, Neil Gaiman, Maya Kaathryn Bohnhoff, and his daughter Mallory Reaves for various novels. Reaves won a 1993 Emmy Award for Outstanding Writing in an Animated Program for his work on Batman: The Animated Series.

Reaves had Parkinson's disease, and for a time maintained a blog concerning his experiences dealing with the disease and its effects, which included difficulty typing and loss of coherent speech. In 2013, Reaves raised $85,000 in a Kickstarter campaign to fund the filming of a feature-length script he had written called Blood Kiss, with the picture set to star Neil Gaiman in his acting debut. Despite exceeding the stated fundraising goal, the film was never made.

Reaves died in Los Angeles on March 20, 2023, at the age of 72.

== Bibliography ==
=== Novels ===
Year	Title	Co-author(s)	Series	Notes
1978	I, Alien			Young adult novel
1979	Dragonworld	Byron Preiss		
1984	Hellstar	Steve Perry		
1984	Sword of the Samurai	Steve Perry	Time Machine	Book 3 of the multi-author young adult series
1984	The Shattered World		The Shattered World	
1987	Dome	Steve Perry		
1988	The Burning Realm		The Shattered World	
1989	The Omega Cage	Steve Perry		
1991	Street Magic			
1995	Night Hunter			
1998	Thong the Barbarian Meets the Cycle Sluts Of Saturn	Steve Perry		
1998	Voodoo Child			
2001	Hell On Earth		The Trine	
2001	Darth Maul: Shadow Hunter		Star Wars	
2004	MedStar I: Battle Surgeons	Steve Perry	Star Wars	
2004	MedStar II: Jedi Healer	Steve Perry	Star Wars	
2006	Mr. Twilight	Maya Kaathryn Bohnhoff	The Trine	
2007	Batman: Fear Itself	Steven-Elliot Altman		
2007	Death Star	Steve Perry	Star Wars	
2007	InterWorld	Neil Gaiman	InterWorld	Young adult novel
2008	Coruscant Nights I: Jedi Twilight		Star Wars	
2008	Coruscant Nights II: Street of Shadows		Star Wars	
2009	Coruscant Nights III: Patterns of Force	Maya Kaathryn Bohnhoff	Star Wars	Initial copies show only Reaves as author; this was later corrected.
2011	Shadow Games	Maya Kaathryn Bohnhoff	Star Wars	
2013	The Silver Dream	Neil Gaiman and Mallory Reaves	InterWorld	Young adult novel
2013	The Last Jedi	Maya Kaathryn Bohnhoff	Star Wars	
2015	Eternity's Wheel	Neil Gaiman and Mallory Reaves	InterWorld	Young adult novel

=== Short fiction ===
Collections

- Darkworld Detective (1981)
- The Night People (2005)

Stories (Note: Short stories unless otherwise noted.)

Title	Year	First published	Reprinted/collected	Notes
The sound of something dying	1976	Reaves, J. Michael (May 1976). "The sound of something dying". F&SF. 50 (5).		
Shadetree	1977	Reaves, J. Michael (September 1977). "Shadetree". F&SF. 53 (3).		
Werewind	1981	Reaves, J. Michael (July 1981). "Werewind". F&SF. 61 (1): 7–27.		Novelette

=== Anthologies editor ===
- Shadows Over Baker Street (2003) (co-editor and contributor)

———————

Bibliography notes

== Screenwriting ==
=== Animated television ===
Series head writer credits are denoted in **bold**

- The New Archie and Sabrina Hour (1977)
- Space Sentinels (1977)
- Web Woman (1978)
- The New Shmoo (1979)
- Blackstar (1981)
- The Smurfs (1981)
- He-Man and the Masters of the Universe (1983)
- The Biskitts (1983)
- **Pole Position** (1984)
- **Mighty Orbots** (1984)
- Dungeons & Dragons (1984–1985)
- Challenge of the GoBots (1985)
- Star Wars: Droids (1985)
- Ewoks (1986)
- Potato Head Kids (1986)
- Teen Wolf (1986)
- The Centurions (1986)
- The Transformers (1986)
- My Little Pony (1986–1987)
- The Real Ghostbusters (1986–1987, 1990)
- Bionic Six (1987)
- Jem (1987)
- Spiral Zone (1987)
- Starcom: The U.S. Space Force (1987)
- Superman (1988)
- Teenage Mutant Ninja Turtles (1988–1990)
- The New Adventures of He-Man (1990)
- Tiny Toon Adventures (1990)
- Fox's Peter Pan & the Pirates (1990–1991)
- **Batman: The Animated Series** (1992–1995)
- Bobby's World (1992)
- **Conan and the Young Warriors** (1994)
- Phantom 2040 (1994–1995)
- **Gargoyles** (1994–1996)
- Invasion America (1998)
- Beast Machines: Transformers (1999–2000)
- **Spider-Man Unlimited** (1999–2001)
- Godzilla: The Series (2000)
- Max Steel (2000)
- He-Man and the Masters of the Universe (2002–2003)

=== Live-action television ===
- The Secrets of Isis – one episode (1975)
- Shazam! – one episode (1976)
- Benji, Zax & the Alien Prince – one episode (1983)
- The Twilight Zone – two episodes produced, and two stories (1986–89)
- Star Trek: The Next Generation – one episode (1987)
- Captain Power and the Soldiers of the Future – two episodes produced, three episodes, and one story (1987–1988)
- Monsters – four episodes (1988–1990)
- Swamp Thing – one episode (1990)
- The Flash – one episode (1990)
- Father Dowling Mysteries – three episodes (1990–1991)
- Young Hercules – one episode (1999)
- Sliders – one episode (1999)
- Star Trek: New Voyages – one episode (2007)

=== Film ===
- Batman: Mask of the Phantasm (1993)
- Full Eclipse (1993)
- Batman: Mystery of the Batwoman (2003)
