= InterWorld =

2007 novel by Neil Gaiman and Michael Reaves

- Cover of InterWorld
- Author: Neil Gaiman and Michael Reaves
- Cover artist: James Jean
- Language: English
- Genre: Science Fantasy
- Publisher: EOS, an imprint of HarperCollins Publishers
- Publication date: June 26, 2007
- Publication place: United States
- English publication date: 2007
- ISBN: 978-0-06-123896-3
- OCLC: 122308994
- LC Class: PZ7.G1273 Int 2007
- Followed by: The Silver Dream

InterWorld is a fantasy and science fiction novel by Neil Gaiman and Michael Reaves. The book was published in 2007 by EOS, an imprint of HarperCollins Publishers. It follows the story of Joey Harker who, together with a group of other Joeys from different Earths in other parallel universes, try to stop the two forces of magic and science from taking over all of the Earths in different universes.

== Plot summary ==
Joey Harker is an average high school student living in Greenville. He has trouble finding his way around his own house, let alone the town. On a field trip set by his Social Studies teacher, Mr. Dimas, Joey finds himself lost in the city, and then enters a strange fog; when he emerges, everything has changed. All the cars are brightly coloured, and the police cars are flashing green and yellow instead of blue and red. When he goes back to his home, he discovers that he does not exist anymore; instead, there is a girl named Josephine living there. He runs outside and meets a man wearing a mirrored mask, who introduces himself as Jay. But before Jay can explain anything, three men in grey outfits appear, standing on floating silver disks, all trying to catch Joey using silver nets. Joey runs away, and unintentionally enters the fog again.

Afraid of going back to a home where he doesn't exist, Joey decides to go to Mr. Dimas for help. Mr Dimas is shocked to see Joey, telling him that he had drowned last year and that Mr. Dimas himself had pulled Joey's body out of the river. Suddenly a woman called Lady Indigo appears in the room, bewitching Joey into following her. She is joined by two other men. One, called Scarabus, has mystical tattoos all over his body; the other, a man with transparent skin, is called Neville. They move Joey to a flying ship, the Lacrimae Mundi.

The ship teleports to Nowhere-at-all, a sort of hyperspace, and heads towards a place called "HEX Prime". Before they can reach there, Jay arrives and helps Joey escape, injuring himself in the process. Joey then opens a portal to the In-Between, a multidimensional world which only Walkers and MDLF beings (multidimensional life forms, or 'mudluffs') can enter. The In-Between is a shortcut for traveling from world to world. Jay explains to Joey that he belongs to an organization called InterWorld, whose task is to keep the altiverse in balance, by stopping the scientific force (Binary) from making worlds too scientific, while also stopping the magical force (HEX) from making worlds too magical. Jay explains that Joey has the ability to "Walk", or pass through the In-Between into other dimensions quickly and smoothly.

Re-entering the "In-Between", they meet a mudluff which looks like a bubble and communicates using colours. It appears to be trapped, and when Joey tries to free it, a giant serpent (revealed in the second book to be called a Gyradon) appears and bites Jay. The mudluff kills the serpent, but Jay is already dying. Before he dies he gives Joey a mathematical equation that will take him to Base Town, the InterWorld HQ: {IW}:=Ω/∞ (InterWorld is Omega over Infinity). The mudluff then becomes attached to Joey and he names it "Hue". When Joey reaches the HQ, he discovers that all the Walkers are copies of himself from different Earths. He now begins an intensive course studying very advanced science and magic to prepare him for his new role as a member of the InterWorld. Many of the other Joeys initially resent Joey for Jay's death, but as his skills improve they soon come round.

After a few months, Joey and four other Walkers set out on a training mission, to retrieve some signal beacons from a more scientific earth. The earth they go to turns out to be a "shadow realm", and is in fact a trap, set by the same people from HEX who captured him earlier. Everyone on the team is captured by HEX, except for Joey, who is saved by Hue. When Joey escapes back to HQ, the leader, an old man named Joe (a.k.a. Old Man), decides that Joey is not capable of working in InterWorld, and wipes his memory of it. Joey is then sent home, where he believes that nothing has happened, but feels that something is missing. Blowing bubbles with his little brother one day, Joey remembers Hue, and all his memories of the Altiverse come back. Joey now says goodbye to his family, walks into the Altiverse again, and sets off to save his team-mates.

With Jay's words in his head and Hue's help, Joey finds the airship where his team-mates are being held, but is again captured by the HEX, and taken to meet their leader, a hideous large goblin called Lord Dogknife. In the centre of the room where his team-mates are being held is a large cauldron, where the HEX boil Walkers down to their raw essence, which is used as fuel for their transdimensional spacecraft.

Joey manages to knock the cauldron over, incinerating some of the guards in the room, and unties his friends. They escape to the engine room, which is filled with the souls from other Walkers, powering the ship. Joey and his team-mates break the jars to free the souls and shut the ship down. The engine explodes, and Joey and his team-mates plan an escape from the Nowhere-At-All through a gate which is closing quickly. Joey, however, decides he cannot leave without Hue, who had saved his life multiple times. When Scarabus and a group of soldiers come into the destroyed engine room to recapture Joey and his team-mates, J/O, a cyborg Joey, defeats Scarabus in a duel, and everyone sets off to track down Lord Dogknife.

Dogknife has meanwhile been captured by the freed souls and rendered harmless. Joey finds Hue, and despite an attempt by Lady Indigo to stop them, escapes with his team-mates through the gate and returns to the Interworld HQ.

Instead of congratulating them for their heroic work, however, the Old Man lectures them on all their wrongdoings in the Altiverse, but he allows Joey to stay, without wiping his memory, and soon the group sets out on another mission.

== In other media ==
The idea of InterWorld surged in 1996, when Reaves was developing an animated series for DreamWorks. Suggesting to Gaiman an idea for a possible animated television series, they collaborated on the story and unsuccessfully tried to sell it to various studios, including DreamWorks, which was not interested. The InterWorld idea ended up as a novel that was not released until 2007.

In June 2007, Neil Gaiman reported in his journal that DreamWorks Animation had optioned the book to make it into an animated feature film.

In June 2016, the plans to make InterWorld as television series were revived by Universal Cable Productions, in association with Hamilton producer Jeffrey Seller and his partner Flody Suarez.

== Sequels ==
The second InterWorld book, titled The Silver Dream, was released on April 23, 2013. The third and final book in the series, titled Eternity's Wheel, was released on May 19, 2015.
