= List of Alien (franchise) novels =

List of novels in the Alien franchise

Alien / Aliens
- The Alien logo was first used for the first film in the franchise and later the novel series.
- Author: Reference individual listings
- Country: United States; United Kingdom
- Language: English
- Publisher: Warner Books (1979–1992 & 1997); Bantam Books (1992–1998); DH Press (2005–2008); Titan Books (2014–present); Imprint (2019)
- Published: March 29, 1979 – August 28, 1998; October 26, 2005 – October 8, 2008; January 28, 2014 – present
- Media type: Print (paperback); E-book; Audiobook

The Alien/Aliens literary franchise consists of multiple novels and short stories based on the eponymous film franchise, which began in 1979 with the release of Alien.

In the 20th century, all Alien-related novels published were adaptations of pre-existing material. From 1979 up to 1997, Warner Books published novelizations of the first four films in the year of release: 1979, 1986, 1992, and 1997. The first three novelizations were written by Alan Dean Foster. Throughout the 1990s, Bantam Books published nine novelizations of Alien comic books published by Dark Horse Comics.

After going on a hiatus, the franchise returned in book form in 2005. DH Press—Dark Horse Comics' novel publishing imprint—published six original novels from 2005 to 2008. This marked the first time in the franchise where novels were original stories, rather than adaptations. DH Press' series took place after the events of Alien Resurrection (1997). Following the release of Aliens: No Exit in 2008, the novel series once more went into hiatus.

In 2014, after six years, Titan Books started publication of Alien novels once more, starting with Alien: Out of the Shadows, written by Tim Lebbon. Out of the Shadows was the first in a trilogy of books, and is canon to the events of the film series. In 2016, Alien: Invasion was published, which is the second book in Lebbon's The Rage Wars trilogy, a crossover between the Alien, Predator, and Alien vs. Predator franchises. The following year, Foster would write both a novelization and prequel to Alien: Covenant (2017). The success of the novels led to the publication of further stories, including a novelization of the video game Alien: Isolation (2014).

== Film and game novelizations ==
Title	Author	Publisher	Date	Length	Notes	Ref.
Alien	Alan Dean Foster	Warner Books	March 29, 1979	270 pp	Novelization of the 1979 film Alien	
Aliens	Alan Dean Foster	Warner Books	June 1, 1986	247 pp	Novelization of the 1986 film Aliens	
Alien 3	Alan Dean Foster	Warner Books	June 11, 1992	218 pp	Novelization of the 1992 film Alien 3	
Alien Resurrection	A. C. Crispin	Aspect Books	November 27, 1997	276 pp	Novelization of the 1997 film Alien Resurrection	
Prometheus	Jon Spaihts and Damon Lindelof	Earth Star Entertainment	August 1, 2012	255 pp	Novelization of the 2012 film Prometheus	
Alien: Covenant	Alan Dean Foster	Titan Publishing Group	May 23, 2017	348pp	Novelization of the 2017 film Alien: Covenant	
Alien: Isolation	Keith DeCandido	Titan Books	July 30, 2019	336pp	Novelization of the 2014 video game Alien: Isolation. As well as retelling the plot of the game, the novel also features a series of non-linear flashbacks detailing Amanda's life before and after the events of Alien.	

== Dark Horse Comics adaptations ==
Title	Author	Publisher	Date	Length	Notes	Ref.
Aliens: Earth Hive	Steve Perry	Bantam Books	September 1, 1992	278 pp	Adapted from the comic book series Aliens vol. 1 (Also known as Aliens: Outbreak) (1988–1989). Wilks was a space marine with a near-fatal flaw: he had a heart. Billie was a child, the only survivor of a far-flung colony outpost. Thrown together in the last hellish night of an Alien invasion, Billie and Wilks helped each other get out alive. Thirteen years later Wilks is in prison, and Billie lives in a mental institution, the nightmare memories of the massacre at Rim seared into her mind. Now the government has tapped Wilks to lead an expedition to the Aliens' home planet to bring back a live Alien. But the competition on Earth to develop the Aliens as a new weapons system is brutal. When Wilks's team departs on their mission, a trained assassin trails them. And what follows is no less than guerrilla warfare on the Aliens' planet — and Alien conquest on Earth!	
Aliens: Nightmare Asylum	Steve Perry	Bantam Books	April 1, 1993	277 pp	Adapted from the comic book series Aliens vol. 2 (Also known as Aliens: Nightmare Asylum) (1989–1990). Wilks, Billie, and Bueller were the last survivors of a devastating assault on the Aliens' home planet. But once their return to the Solar System made them refugees once more, fleeing Earth and its Alien infestation in a desperate attempt to stay alive. Now, in an otherwise unmanned military transport, they hurtle through space. Destination: unknown. Little do they know that the cargo they carry with them is a legacy of death that they will ultimately have to face. Nor do they know that they head toward a remote colony and military outpost. This pocket of humanity at the very edges of space is at the mercy of a general named Spears with an agenda all his own. Now Billie, Wilks, and Bueller face a new nightmare, and it is nothing they could ever have imagined: a gift of madness from an Alien world, unbalanced mind, and the experiences of a mysterious pilot named Lieutenant Ellen Ripley.	
Aliens: The Female War	Steve Perry and Stephani Perry	Bantam Books	July 1, 1993	293 pp	Adapted from the comic book series Aliens: Earth War (also known as Aliens: Female War) (1990). Lieutenant Ellen Ripley awoke from her long journey in space with a hole in her memory and an overwhelming drive to survive. When she meets Wilks and Billie, two battered veterans in the war against the Aliens she realizes she's found two comrades in arms — and she's ready to take up the fight. Only then does she discover the devastating secret that lurks behind her long sleep. When she, Wilks, and Billie prepare to meet the Aliens head-on to turn a powerful Alien queen against her spawn in a battle intended to save Earth, that secret becomes her greatest weapon — and her greatest liability. As the fate of Earth hangs in the balance, Ripley and Billie must come to terms with what it means to be Alien… and what it means to be human.	
Aliens: Genocide	David Bischoff	Bantam Books	December 1, 1993	181 pp	Adapted from the comic book series Aliens: Genocide (1991–1992)	
Aliens: Alien Harvest	Robert Sheckley	Bantam Spectra	August 1, 1995	296 pp	Adapted from the comic book series Aliens: Hive (also known as Aliens: Harvest) (1992). A dying man becomes involved in a plot to steal royal jelly from an Alien hive, believing it to be a cure for his cancer.	
Aliens: Rogue	Sandy Schofield	Bantam Spectra	November 1, 1995	288 pp	Adapted from the comic book series Aliens: Rogue (1993) Welcome to the former penal colony of Charon, where a labyrinth of tunnels offer shelter to an Alien hive. Professor Ernst Kleist rules—a paranoid tyrant whose speciality is making humans disappear. Captain Joyce Palmer is bound for Charon. Only she and a few hand-picked Marines can stop Kleist in his tracks. Only they can stop the professor’s most insane creation—the Rogue.	
Aliens: Labyrinth	S. D. Perry	Bantam Spectra	March 1, 1996	243 pp	Adapted from the comic book series Aliens: Labyrinth (1993–1994). On the space station Innominata the infamous Dr. Paul Church has built a maze of tunnels. Church is hiding the results of his latest experiments. His aim: to bring human and Alien together as one being. Colonel Dr. Tony Crespi has one ambition — to work with Church. But one by one the men on Innominata have been dying in the attempt to meld Alien and man. When Crespi finds his way to the heart of the labyrinth he discovers a chamber of horrors—will he ever be able to find a way out?	
Aliens: Music of the Spears	Yvonne Navarro	Bantam Spectra	September 1, 1996	275 pp	Adapted from the comic book series Aliens: Music of the Spears (1994).	
Aliens: Berserker	S. D. Perry	Bantam Spectra	August 28, 1998	227 pp	Adapted from the comic book series Aliens: Berserker (1995).	

== Further novels ==
Title	Author	Publisher	Date	Length	Notes	Ref.
Aliens: Original Sin	Michael Jan Friedman	DH Press	October 26, 2005	252 pp	Although this book is based on the second film of the franchise, it is the sequel to the 1997 film Alien Resurrection. It brings back characters like Ripley 8, the clone of Lt. Ellen Ripley, and android Call. It also sorts out unanswered questions from the movies and raises entirely new ones. Was it just coincidence that the Nostromo happened to pass by the desolate planet? Why was the Alien on the crashed ship in the first place?	
Aliens: DNA War	Diane Carey	DH Press	May 17, 2006	269 pp	It follows detective Rory Malvaux and the crew of the Vinza as they attempt to extract a group of scientists — including Rory's mother Jocasta — who have unexpectedly encountered Xenomorphs on the planet Rosamond 6. However, upon arriving, the Vinza's crew discover the scientists are not only unwilling to leave, but may be engaging in foul play to preserve the very creatures that stalk them.	
Aliens: Cauldron	Diane Carey	DH Press	June 13, 2006	284 pp	It follows the crews of two cargo starships, the Virginia and the Umiak, as an attempt to illicitly smuggle live Xenomorphs unleashes the deadly creatures upon them.	
Aliens: Steel Egg	John Shirley	DH Press	October 3, 2007	270 pp	Set several decades before the events of the original Alien, the story concerns the crew of the UNIC Hornblower, who are dispatched on a routine survey mission to Saturn where they discover an ancient extraterrestrial spacecraft in orbit around Iapetus, one of the planet's moons. Upon boarding the mysterious vessel, the unprepared crew soon find themselves trapped in a fight for survival against the Xenomorphs that they accidentally awaken on board.	
Aliens: Criminal Enterprise	Stephani Perry	DH Press	January 16, 2008	222 pp	When his brother falls into debt with ruthless drug dealers, Tommy Chase is forced to take a one-time assignment piloting one of the organization's transport ships to wipe the slate clean. The journey takes him to the remote planet called Fantasia, where the dealers operate a secret drug lab kept safe by the horde of frenetic Xenomorphs that swarm Fantasia's surface. However, when the facility comes under attack from rival forces, the creatures intended to keep the operation safe become an unstoppable threat to everyone on the planet.	
Aliens: No Exit	B. K. Evenson	DH Press	October 8, 2008	283 pp		
Alien: Out of the Shadows	Tim Lebbon	Titan Books	January 28, 2014	344 pp	Set between the events of Alien and Aliens. The novel tells the story of a group of miners harvesting trimonite, the hardest material known to man, on the planet LV-178. Deep within the mines, they uncover the ruins of an ancient civilization infested with Xenomorphs, which infiltrate the miners' spaceship, the Marion. Ellen Ripley's shuttle, the Narcissus, picks up a distress call from the Marion and docks with it, and she is left to help the miners survive the Xenomorphs as well as uncover why the shuttle seemed to dock on its own accord.	
Alien: Sea of Sorrows	James A. Moore	Titan Books	July 25, 2014	351 pp	A follow-up to Out of the Shadows, set many years after Alien Resurrection. LV-178 is now colonized and renamed New Galveston, with Alan Decker, a deputy commissioner for the ICC, charged with making sure the settlements on the planet follow all the rules. While investigating region of the planet with incredibly toxic sands, dubbed the Sea of Sorrows, Decker's previously latent empathic abilities cause him to briefly connect with the Xenomorphs still lying dormant beneath the planet. The Weyland-Yutani Corporation sees this as another opportunity to capture one of the creatures, forcibly recruiting Decker onto a team of mercenaries to accomplish this. Decker is unable to refuse, as centuries ago, his ancestor fought the Xenomorphs, launching a bloody vendetta that was never satisfied. That was when the creatures swore revenge on the Destroyer… Ellen Ripley.	
Alien: River of Pain	Christopher Golden	Titan Books	November 25, 2014	341 pp	In this novel, the Xenomorph infestation of Hadley's Hope on Acheron (LV-426), which occurred off-screen in Aliens, is depicted. It notably incorporates several sequences previously seen in the comic Aliens: Newt's Tale and also references the events of the Fire and Stone comic.	
Alien: Invasion	Tim Lebbon	Titan Books	April 26, 2016	313 pp	This book is the second chapter in the Rage War trilogy, following up after the events of the novel Predator: Incursion. The trilogy tells the story of a rogue human faction known as the Rage, who launch an invasion against the primary human sphere of influence using an army of Xenomorph shock troopers, with the Yautja caught in the crossfire. It was succeeded by Alien vs. Predator: Armageddon.	
Alien: Covenant - Origins	Alan Dean Foster	Titan Books	September 26, 2017	346pp	Prequel to the 2017 film Alien: Covenant	
Alien: The Cold Forge	Alex White	Titan Books	April 24, 2018	332 pp	The Weyland-Yutani Corporation breeds Xenomorphs from eggs acquired through unknown means aboard the Cold Forge, a secret deep space research station on which the company is hoping to develop the creatures as biological weapons. Dr. Blue Marsalis, the physically handicapped scientist heading the experiments, secretly seeks to harvest a sample of a virulent mutagen produced by the Xenomorphs to cure her terminal degenerative illness. Her research is put in jeopardy when Dorian Sudler, a malicious auditor from Weyland-Yutani, is sent to review the station's work. Things are only further complicated when an unknown saboteur unleashes the Xenomorph specimens from containment, setting them loose aboard the station.	
Alien: Echo	Mira Grant	Imprint	April 9, 2019	304 pp	The first young adult novel in the Alien franchise, Echo is set on the planet Zegreus, home to a human agricultural colony that becomes the site of a Xenomorph outbreak. The protagonist, a young woman named Olivia Shipp, relies on knowledge of xenobiology taught to her by her parents to get her and her twin sister Viola offworld alive.	
Alien: Prototype	Tim Waggoner	Titan Books	October 29, 2019	352 pp	A sequel to Alien: Isolation, Prototype is a completely original story starring Zula Hendricks, a character from the comic books. A member of the United States Colonial Marine Corps, Hendricks is assigned with training a group of security recruits on the colony of Jericho 3, where a Xenomorph egg is unknowingly being studied by a rival corporation of Weyland-Yutani. The resulting Xenomorph inherits a genetic mutation from its host that gives it the ability to release a deadly pathogen, putting everyone in the colony at risk.	
Aliens: Phalanx	Scott Sigler	Titan Books	February 25, 2020	340 pp	Ataegina is an isolated world of medieval castles, varied cultures, and conquests, vibrant until a massive infestation of Xenomorphs arises and spreads relentless destruction, killing 90% of the planet's population. Terrified survivors flee to hidden mountain keeps where they eke out a meager existence. When a trio of young warriors discovers a new weapon, they see a chance to end the infestation. To save humanity, the trio must fight their way to the tunnels of Black Smoke Mountain — the lair of an Alien Queen, the mythical Demon Mother.	
Alien: Into Charybdis	Alex White	Titan Books	February 23, 2021	560 pp	A follow-up to The Cold Forge, Into Charybdis follows the crew of the science vessel USS Gardenia, which is working for the technology supplier company McAllen Integrations. Under the company's instructions, the ship travels to Charybdis, an Iranian colony set up on the planet LV-991, to design and install vital systems to the colony's infrastructure. They instead find a Xenomorph running lose in the facility, and the chaos brewed from the creature's rampage threatens to cause a diplomatic crisis between the Americans and the Iranians, prompting the Colonial Marines to respond.	
Aliens: Infiltrator	Weston Ochse	Titan Books	April 20, 2021	344 pp	A prequel to the video game Aliens: Fireteam Elite, Infiltrator stars Weyland-Yutani scientist Dr. Timothy Hoenikker. Hired by the company under the presumption that he is needed to study extraterrestrial artifacts, Hoenikker instead ends up on Pala Station, a facility run by a warped bureaucracy where Xenomorphs are being bred and the species' bio-materials are being used on other life forms. Due to the actions of an unknown saboteur, the operation predictably falls out of control.	
Alien 3: The Unproduced Screenplay	Pat Cadigan	Titan Books	August 31, 2021	340 pp	Based on the earliest screenplay concept by William Gibson for the film Alien 3, The Unproduced Screenplay is an original story and sequel to Aliens that ignores the events of Alien 3 and Alien Resurrection. The Sulaco, after leaving LV-426, drifts into the territory of the Union of Progressive Peoples, a socialist human polity operating outside of the primary human sphere of influence. The four survivors are brought to the space station Anchorpoint where scientists for both the UPP and Weyland-Yutani begin experimenting with cloned Xenomorphs grown from genetic material left behind by the queen on the Sulaco. This is the third adaptation of Gibson's script, as the novel was preceded by a comic book adaptation and audio drama.	
Alien: Colony War	David Barnett	Titan Books	April 26, 2022	416 pp	The story deals with rampant political discontent between the nations of Earth after the events of Into Charybdis, and introduces Chad McLaren, the husband of Amanda Ripley, who is caught in the middle of both the interhuman conflicts and efforts by the conflicting sides to weaponize the Xenomorph. The novel also contains an exclusive tie-in game scenario based on Alien: The Roleplaying Game titled Fallout.	
Alien: Inferno's Fall	Philippa Ballantine	Titan Books	July 26, 2022	464 pp	Starring recurring protagonist Zula Hendricks, the novel is set on Shānmén, a mining colony run by the Union of Progressive Peoples which comes under attack by an Engineer starship that unleashes various Xenomorph-like mutations upon that planet.	
Aliens: Vasquez	V. Castro	Titan Books	October 25, 2022	432 pp	The novel tells the life story of Jenette Vasquez long before the doomed mission to Hadley’s Hope, from joining a street gang, followed by prison, joining the Colonial Marines, and giving up her twin children Leticia and Ramón to be raised by her sister, leading into the events of Aliens, before cutting decades later to the Vasquez twins respectively joining the military and Weyland-Yutani, their independent investigations into their mother's death leading the two to a world soon-to-be-ravaged by Xenomorphs.	
Alien: Enemy of My Enemy	Mary SanGiovanni	Titan Books	February 21, 2023	416 pp	All across the galaxy, the mysterious black substance "Prometheus fire" is rained down on Earth settlements, creating hideous monsters from indigenous creatures and human beings, sent by a secret society worshipping the Xenomorph, seeking to set off a civil war between the human colonies of the known universe.	
Aliens: Bishop	T. R. Napper	Titan Books	December 12, 2023	496 pp	Following the events of Alien 3, Bishop is reawakened and repaired by his creator Michael Bishop Weyland, seeking to "advance medical research for the benefit of humanity". Bishop finds himself pursued by Colonial Marines, "Dog Catchers" commandos employed by Weyland-Yutani, and others seeking Bishop's knowledge on the Xenomorph.	
Alien: Uncivil War	Brendan Deneen	Titan Books	July 30, 2024	352 pp	After leaving a ruined Earth and escaping a Xenomorph attack, Chris Temple and his daughters crash-land on a planet on the verge of civil war. A former military man, Chris must call on the skills he never wanted to use again to protect his daughters, deal with violent marines, and battle the Xenomorph killing people regardless of which side of the civil war they are on.	
Alien: Seventh Circle	Philippa Ballantine & Clara Carija	Titan Books	January 7, 2025	416 pp	Following the events of Alien: Inferno's Fall, a family of scavengers who recover an amnesiac Mae Hendricks from the wreckage of an unidentified ship bring a world of pain on themselves and the residents of Guelph Station as a result.	
Alien: Cult	Gavin G. Smith	Titan Books	November 4, 2025	496 pp	In this murder mystery, FBI agent Tyler Matterton and his synthetic partner Serena investigate Xenomorph-related deaths circling around a Xenomorph-worshipping religion in service of their goddess.	
Alien: Perfect Organisms	Shaun Hamill	Titan Books	Nov 15, 2025			

== Collections ==
- The Complete Aliens Omnibus: Volume 1 – collects Earth Hive, Nightmare Asylum and The Female War (Titan Books, January 2016, ISBN 1-78329-901-0)
- The Complete Aliens Omnibus: Volume 2 – collects Genocide and Alien Harvest (Titan Books, June 2016, ISBN 1-78329-903-7)
- The Complete Aliens Omnibus: Volume 3 – collects Rogue and Labyrinth (Titan Books, December 2016, ISBN 1-78329-905-3)
- The Complete Aliens Omnibus: Volume 4 – collects Music of the Spears and Berserker (Titan Books, June 2017, ISBN 1-78329-907-X)
- The Complete Aliens Omnibus: Volume 5 – collects Original Sin and DNA War (Titan Books, December 2017, ISBN 1-78329-909-6)
- The Complete Aliens Omnibus: Volume 6 – collects Cauldron and Steel Egg (Titan Books, June 2018, ISBN 1-78329-912-6)
- The Complete Aliens Omnibus: Volume 7 – collects Criminal Enterprise and No Exit (Titan Books, December 2018, ISBN 1-78329-913-4)
- The Complete Alien Collection: The Shadow Archive – collects Out of the Shadows, Sea of Sorrows, and River of Pain (Titan Books, January 2023, ISBN 1-80336-116-6)
- The Complete Alien Collection: Symphony of Death – collects The Cold Forge, Prototype, and Into Charybdis(Titan Books, November 2023, ISBN 1-80336-658-3)
- The Complete Aliens Collection: Living Nightmares – collects Phalanx, Infiltrator, and Vasquez (Titan Books, November 2024, ISBN 1-80336-660-5)
- Aliens: Bug Hunt (Titan Books, April 18, 2017, ISBN 978-1785654442)

== See also ==
- List of Alien (franchise) comics
- List of Alien vs. Predator novels
- List of Predator (franchise) novels
- List of Predator (franchise) comics
