= Alex White (author) =

American author of science fiction (born 1981)

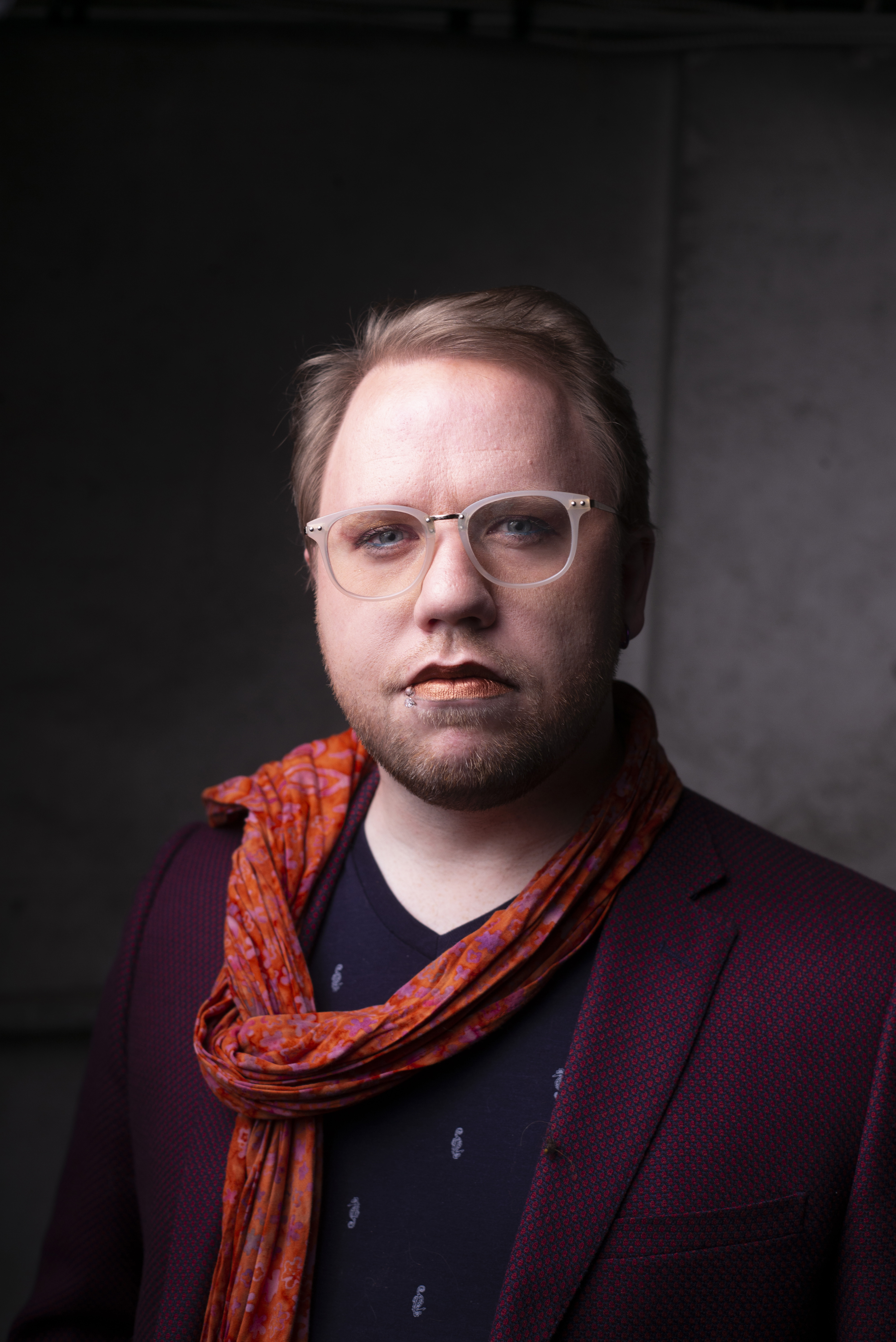
- Born: November 4, 1981 (age 45); Mississippi, USA
- Occupations: Novelist; Experience Designer
- Writing career
- Language: English
- Genres: Science fiction; Horror
- Notable work: The Salvagers trilogy
- Website: www.alexrwhite.com

Alex White (born November 4, 1981) is an American author of science fiction and horror. They are best known for The Salvagers trilogy and their tie-in novels for the Alien and Star Trek franchises. White uses singular they pronouns.

== Biography ==
White is autistic, bisexual, and queer and uses non-binary singular they pronouns. White was born in Mississippi and has lived in the American South for most of their life.

They live in Georgia, in the southern United States, with their spouse and son, working as an experience designer in addition to their writing career.

== Career ==
White is the author and composer for the audio fiction podcast The Gearheart, which ran for 5 years.

White's debut novel, the dystopian horror Every Mountain Made Low, was published by Solaris Books in 2016.

In 2018, White launched the space opera series The Salvagers at Orbit Books with the first volume, A Big Ship at the Edge of the Universe, and the second volume A Bad Deal for the Whole Galaxy following later the same year. The final volume of the trilogy, The Worst of All Possible Worlds (2021) was met with critical success, notably receiving a starred review and weekly pick status from Publishers Weekly.

White has written original tie-in novels for both the Alien and Star Trek franchises. Titan Books published White's The Cold Forge in 2018, and Into Charybdis in 2021, both of which were well received by fans of the franchise, with elements of the former novel being adapted to the 2024 feature film Alien: Romulus. Their novel Star Trek: Deep Space Nine: Revenant was published by Pocket Books in 2021 and follows Jadzia Dax, and other characters from Star Trek: Deep Space Nine, through a tale built on a blend of science fiction and horror.

In 2022, Orbit Books published White's new space opera, August Kitko and the Mechas from Space, first in The Starmetal Symphony trilogy, to critical acclaim, earning a starred review from Publishers Weekly, which said it "expertly combines well-executed action with witty banter between charming characters". Emily Whitmore's review in Booklist said "White balances the elements of this space opera brilliantlyzzzfrom the emotional connection between the characters to the huge plot pieces".

== Bibliography ==
=== Novels ===
- Every Mountain Made Low (Solaris, 2016)

==== The Salvagers trilogy ====
- A Big Ship at the Edge of the Universe (Orbit, 2018)
- A Bad Deal for the Whole Galaxy (Orbit, 2018)
- The Worst of All Possible Worlds (Orbit, 2020)

==== The Starmetal Symphony trilogy ====
- August Kitko and the Mechas from Space (Orbit, 2022)
- Ardent Violet and the Infinite Eye (Orbit, 2024)

=== Tie-in novels ===
==== Alien novels ====
- The Cold Forge (Titan, 2018)
- Into Charybdis (Titan, 2021)

==== Star Trek novels ====
- Star Trek: Deep Space Nine: Revenant (Pocket Books, 2021)

=== Short fiction ===
- "The Boy, the Bomb, and the Witch Who Returned", first published in Ministry Protocol: Thrilling Tales of the Ministry of Peculiar Occurrences, Imagine That! Studios, 2013

== See also ==
- List of science-fiction authors
- List of Star Trek novels: Deep Space Nine (1993–2021)
- Alien: Romulus
