= List of manga published by Akita Shoten =

Manga published by Akita Shoten

Akita Shoten company logo

Akita Shoten is a Japanese publishing company, which has published several manga series in their magazines.

== 1960s ==
=== 1969 ===
- The Abashiri Family
- The Crater
- Dororo

== 1970s ==
=== 1970 ===
- Sensuikan Super Nine Nine

=== 1971 ===
- Babel II

=== 1972 ===
- Dokaben
- Gun Frontier

=== 1973 ===
- Black Jack
- Cutie Honey

=== 1974 ===
- Cosmoship Yamato

=== 1975 ===
- Bride of Deimos
- Eko Eko Azarak
- Grendizer
- Uchu Enban Daisenso

=== 1976 ===
- Crest of the Royal Family
- From Eroica with Love

=== 1977 ===
- His Name Is 101
- Space Pirate Captain Harlock

=== 1979 ===
- The Book of Human Insects
- Mobile Suit Gundam

== 1980s ==
=== 1981 ===
- A, A Prime

=== 1982 ===
- Plawres Sanshiro

=== 1983 ===
- Dai Kōshien

=== 1987 ===
- Lady!!
- Ogenki Clinic

=== 1988 ===
- Darkside Blues
- Vampire Princess Miyu

== 1990s ==
=== 1990 ===
- Crows

=== 1991 ===
- Baki the Grappler
- Inochi no Utsuwa

=== 1992 ===
- Samurai Legend

=== 1993 ===
- Super Radical Gag Family

=== 1994 ===
- Apocalypse Zero
- Canon

=== 1995 ===
- A.I. Revolution
- Dokaben Professional Baseball

=== 1996 ===
- Musashi Number 9

=== 1998 ===
- Alien Nine

=== 1999 ===
- Fire Candy
- New Grappler Baki: In Search of Our Strongest Hero

== 2000s ==
=== 2000 ===
- Battle Royale
- By the Sword
- Hanaukyo Maid Team
- Love Junkies
- Nanaka 6/17
- Three in Love
- With the Light

=== 2001 ===
- Cantarella
- Dejiko's Champion Cup
- Eiken
- Ikebukuro West Gate Park
- S-CRY-ed
- Seven of Seven

=== 2002 ===
- Bogle
- Demon City Shinjuku
- Hungry Heart: Wild Striker
- Koi Koi Seven
- No Bra
- Noodle Fighter Miki
- Original! Super Radical Gag Family
- Saint Seiya Episode.G
- Worst
- X-Day

=== 2003 ===
- Alien 9 Emulators
- Battle Royale II: Blitz Royale
- Crossroad
- Fūma no Kojirō: Yagyū Ansatsuchō
- Gaki Rock
- The Knockout Makers
- Princess Tutu
- Shigurui
- Tenshi Ja Nai!!

=== 2004 ===
- After School Nightmare
- Cutie Honey
- Dokaben Superstars
- Fuan no Tane
- Junk: Record of the Last Hero
- My-HiME
- Oyayubihime Infinity
- Ray the Animation

=== 2005 ===
- Baki: Son of Ogre
- Black Jack: the Dark Surgeon
- Crown
- Densha Otoko: The Story of a Train Man Who Fell in Love With A Girl
- My-Otome
- Train Man: Go, Poison Man!
- Squid Girl

=== 2006 ===
- Cat Paradise
- Franken Fran
- KimiKiss: Sweet lips
- Mitsudomoe
- Muteki Kanban Musume N
- The Qwaser of Stigmata
- Saint Seiya: The Lost Canvas
- Saint Seiya: Next Dimension
- Samurai Harem: Asu no Yoichi
- Shinobi Life
- Sundome
- Tōhai

=== 2007 ===
- Blue Drop: Maiorita Tenshi
- Blue Drop: Tenshi no Bokura
- Blue Drop: Tenshi no Itazura
- El Cazador de la Bruja
- Doki Doki Majo Shinpan!
- Fuan no Tane Plus
- Nekogami Yaoyorozu
- Squid Girl
- Volume 0: Aiolos

=== 2008 ===
- Aki Sora
- Black Rose Alice
- Demon King Daimao
- Rescue Me!
- Yowamushi Pedal

=== 2009 ===
- Cocoon
- Hana no Zubora-Meshi

== 2010s ==
=== 2010 ===
- Always! Super Radical Gag Family
- Ibitsu
- Sugarless

=== 2011 ===
- Maoyū Maō Yūsha: Oka no Mukō e
- Saint Seiya: The Lost Canvas - Anecdotes

=== 2012 ===
- Dokaben Dream Tournament
- Magical Girl Apocalypse

=== 2013 ===
- Le Fruit de la Grisaia: Sanctuary Fellows
- Saint Seiya: Saintia Shō

=== 2014 ===
- Saint Seiya Episode.G: Assassin
- Shounen Princess: Putri Harimau Naoko
- The Way of Baki

=== 2015 ===
- The House in Fata Morgana: Anata no Hitomi o Tozasu Monogatari

=== 2016 ===
- Beast Complex
- Beastars

=== 2018 ===
- The Dangers in My Heart
- Ippon Again!

=== 2019 ===
- My New Boss Is Goofy
- Sake to Koi ni wa Yotte Shikarubeki
- Mairimashita! Iruma-Kun

== 2020s ==
=== 2020 ===
- Shiawase wa Tabete Nete Mate

=== 2021 ===
- Plus-Sized Elf
- Tonari no Onee-san ga Suki

== Unsorted ==
- The Devil of the Earth
- Ikebukuro West Gate Park R
