= Brynne Chandler =

American novelist (born 1958)

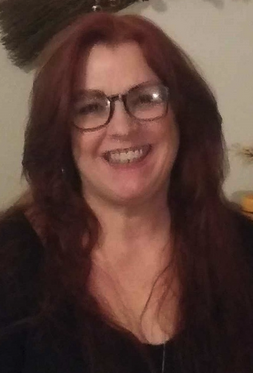
- Chandler in 2025
- Born: 1958 (age 67–68)
- Occupations: Television writer; Manga editor; Novelist
- Children: Mallory Reaves; Dashiell Reaves; Alexander Reaves
- Writing career
- Pen name: J. Brynne Stephens; Brynne Stephens
- Years active: 1983–present

Brynne Chandler (born 1958) is a writer and story editor best known for her work on animated television series such as Gargoyles, Spider-Man: The Animated Series, Batman: The Animated Series, Teenage Mutant Ninja Turtles, and He-Man and the Masters of the Universe, amongst many others. She was nominated for an Emmy award for her work on Batman, and was at one point the highest-paid female animation writer working in Hollywood. She also has extensive credits in writing/adapting graphic novels (including an adaptation of Anne McCaffrey's Dragonflight), as well as editing and adapting manga.

At the beginning of her career (circa 1983), she was billed as J. Brynne Stephens, then simply as Brynne Stephens. As Brynne Stephens, she published a handful of short stories and an experimental gamebook novel called The Dream Palace (1986), all while continuing to write numerous animated television scripts. She also wrote the text of the 1984 videogame Dragonworld, based on the novel by Byron Preiss and Michael Reaves. In her career, Chandler was the first solo female story editor at DIC Entertainment and 10 years later, she was the first solo female story editor at Disney. Later, she was Senior Editor at boutique manga publisher Go! Comi.

She was married for a time to Michael Reaves, and at that time was billed as Brynne Chandler Reaves.

She is the mother of noted manga adapter and novelist Mallory Reaves.

== Writing credits ==
=== Television series ===
- He-Man and the Masters of the Universe (1983)
- She-Ra: Princess of Power (1986)
- My Little Pony (1986) - story editor
- Potato Head Kids (1986)
- Beverly Hills Teens (1987)
- Dinosaucers (1987) - story editor
- Teenage Mutant Ninja Turtles (1987)
- Starcom: The U.S. Space Force (1987) - also creator, story editor
- Sylvanian Families (1987)
- Dink, the Little Dinosaur (1989-1990)
- The New Adventures of He-Man (1990)
- Fox's Peter Pan & the Pirates (1991)
- Batman: The Animated Series (1992)
- Phantom 2040 (1994)
- Conan and the Young Warriors (1994) - also story editor
- Spider-Man: The Animated Series (1995)
- Gargoyles (1997) - also story editor
- Spider-Man Unlimited (1999)
- Beast Machines: Transformers (1999-2000)
- Action Man (2000)
- Spider Man: The Venom Saga (2005)
- Go-Go Bus (2020-2022)
- Team S.T.E.A.M. Beyond! (2021-2022)
- Weather Hunters (2024-2025)

=== Novels ===
- The Dream Palace (1986)

=== Manga ===
- After School Nightmare (2006-2009) - editor
- Japan Ai: A Tall Girl's Adventures in Japan (2007) - editor
- Tenshi Ja Nai!! (2007) - adaptation/editor
- Black Sun Silver Moon (2007-2008) - editor
- Cantarella (2007-2008) - adaptation/editor
- Yggdrasil (2008) - editor
- A.I. Revolution (2008) - adaptation/editor
- A Wise Man Sleeps (2008) - adaptation/editor
- Bogle (2008) - adaptation/editor
- Bound Beauty (2009) - adaptation/editor
- Crown (2009) - adaptation/editor
