= Mallory Reaves =

American writer (born 1984)

Mallory Reaves (born 1984 to parents Michael Reaves and Brynne Chandler) is a writer from Southern California. She was initially known for her adaptations of the popular manga series After School Nightmare (nominated for a 2007 Will Eisner Award), Black Sun, Silver Moon, Her Majesty's Dog, and 07-Ghost. In addition to her work adapting manga, she assisted in editing or producing many other titles, the Go! Comi website content, and monthly newsletter.

In 2013, she co-authored The Silver Dream with Michael Reaves and Neil Gaiman. The book was a sequel to the New York Times bestseller InterWorld. The third volume, Eternity's Wheel, was released in 2015.

Most recently, she authored the graphic novel Mirror Moon (2021), set in the universe of The Nightmare Before Christmas.

== Novels ==
- The Silver Dream (2013) – with Michael Reaves and Neil Gaiman
- Eternity's Wheel (2015) – with Michael Reaves and Neil Gaiman
- Flowbreaker (2026) - with Andrew Rowe

== Manga/Graphic novels ==
- Belle's Tale (2017)
- Mirror Moon (2021) - illustrated by Gabriella Chianello and Nataliya Torretta
- The Beast's Tale (2022)

=== Manga adapted ===
- 07-Ghost (vols. 1-3)
- After School Nightmare
- Black Sun, Silver Moon
- Crossroads (vol. 4 & 5)
- Her Majesty's Dog (vols. 7-11)
- Night of the Beasts (vol. 2)
- Tenshi Ja Nai!! (vol. 6)
- Yggdrasil

=== Manga edited ===
- The Devil Within
- Kanna
- Tenshi Ja Nai!!
- A Wise Man Sleeps

=== Manga produced ===
- Cantarella
- Tenshi Ja Nai!!
- Train+Train

== Other works ==
In addition to her work as a writer, Mallory has dabbled in voice- and screen-acting, appearing in the anime series NieA 7 (credited as Mowi Reaves) and the Star Trek: The New Voyages episode "World Enough and Time".
