= David Wise (writer) =

American television and animation writer (1955–2020)

- Born: February 1, 1955
- Died: March 3, 2020 (aged 65)
- Occupation: Writer
- Writing career
- Language: English
- Genres: Science fiction

David Wise (February 1, 1955 – March 3, 2020) was an American television and animation writer, tutored by writers such as Ursula K. Le Guin, Frank Herbert, Harlan Ellison and Theodore Sturgeon whilst attending the Clarion Workshop.

He wrote several episodes for television series like Star Trek: The Animated Series, the 1984 Transformers cartoon, and the 1987 Teenage Mutant Ninja Turtles cartoon.

== Early life ==
David Wise was born on February 1, 1955, to Electronic Arts Intermix founder Howard Wise and his wife, Barbara.

Wise began experimenting with animation and live-action film at the age of seven, under the tutelage of several artists and experimental filmmakers, including Len Lye and Stan VanDerBeek. Wise created dozens of brief animations using cut-outs, scratch-on-film techniques, as well as conventional cel animation.

In 1963, at the age of eight, Wise released a compilation of his experiments, titled "Short Circuit". Distributed by the Filmmakers' Cooperative, "Short Circuit" was shown throughout the world, won several awards, and was the U.S. entry in the "Child & the World" festival in Czechoslovakia. Writing in the Village Voice, filmmaker and critic Jonas Mekas called Wise "the Mozart of Cinema".

By the time he was nine, he was lecturing on filmmaking at universities and film societies (including Washington & Lee and the University of Maryland at Baltimore), and appeared on numerous television shows, including I've Got a Secret with Steve Allen as host.

== Career ==
=== Star Trek: The Animated Series ===
At the age of sixteen, Wise abandoned film-making for writing, determined to become a professional science fiction writer. The following year Wise sold several SF short stories to various anthologies. This led directly to his first television writing job, an episode of Filmation's animated Star Trek series entitled "How Sharper Than a Serpent's Tooth," written in collaboration with Russell L. Bates. The series as a whole won the only Emmy any Star Trek series has won in a non-technical category, for best children's production.

=== Buck Rogers, Wonder Woman, He-Man and Mighty Orbots ===
After a successful stint of live action work, writing for Glen A. Larson's Buck Rogers (the "Space Vampire" episode) and the Lynda Carter series Wonder Woman, Wise returned to animation in the 1980s, collaborating on many of the animated endeavours of that period such as He-Man and Mighty Orbots.

=== Transformers ===
Wise also wrote Transformers episodes during the second and fourth seasons, including the Optimus Prime origin story "War Dawn", the comedy chase format of "Kremzeek", and the final three episodes of the original G1 series "The Rebirth", which Wise was forced to edit from five parts to three due to diminishing popularity of the franchise. During this period Wise also wrote scripts for Jem and My Little Pony.

=== Teenage Mutant Ninja Turtles ===
In 1987, Wise was given the call to develop and write a five-part animated television pilot based on an independent comic, Teenage Mutant Ninja Turtles. Wise helped change the darker toned black and white Mirage title into a fun, bright, cheerful animated show. Wise left after the ninth season, writing and story editing over 100 episodes.

=== Disney and Batman: The Animated Series ===
Wise next worked on Disney's Chip 'n Dale: Rescue Rangers, and Mighty Ducks cartoons, and also wrote three episodes for Batman: The Animated Series, "The Clock King," "The Strange Secret of Bruce Wayne" (based on Steve Englehart's comic book story), and the origin story of The Riddler, "If You're So Smart, Why Aren't You Rich?".

=== Other animated series and live-action projects ===
He wrote the Battletoads animated pilot episode, as well as the two-part pilot for C.O.P.S., "The Case of C.O.P.S. File 1." He wrote some episodes of Defenders of The Earth. He wrote and story-edited such comic-based series as Cadillacs and Dinosaurs and Jim Lee's WildC.A.T.S. He also developed, story-edited, and wrote most of the 26 episodes of Disney TV's Mighty Ducks: The Animated Series. During this period he also wrote and produced the live-action film Beastmaster III: The Eye of Braxus, and was the first writer/story-editor on an animated interpretation of Zorro.

=== Go! Media Entertainment ===
Wise's TV writing career ended with his work on Zorro in 1997. He was later founder, owner and CEO of the multi-media company Go! Media Entertainment from 2005 to 2010. Go! Media Entertainment consisted of the publishing imprint Go! Comi, and the digital entertainment division oPlay. Go! Comi was a moderately successful imprint (amongst the titles published were the Eisner-nominated After School Nightmare, adapted by Mallory Reaves and edited by Brynne Chandler), but oPlay's digital entertainment app was unsuccessful, leading to the company's bankruptcy.

=== Other work ===
He wrote the final episode of the fourth series of the Doctor Who-related Gallifrey audio drama series for UK-based Big Finish Productions. In 2019, David was announced as part of the team developing a television series based on the life of decorated dog hero Sergeant Stubby, serving as a prequel to the 2018 animated feature film Sgt. Stubby: An American Hero (with which Wise had no involvement). Two years earlier, he was announced to be writing a feature adaptation of the graphic novel Pet Robots for Animal Crackers producer Blue Dream Studios. Both projects were written alongside his wife Audry Taylor and artist and animator Scott Christian Sava, and remain unproduced.

== Personal life ==
Wise was married to writer/actor Patti Howeth Wise from 1987-1999. Notably, the couple co-wrote the first five Teenage Mutant Ninja Turtles TV episodes. He subsequently married Audry Taylor in 2000; though the two collaborated on various projects, none were produced or saw release. They remained married until his death in 2020.

Wise died of lung cancer on March 3, 2020, after a brief illness, at the age of 65 years.

== Screenwriting credits ==
- series head writer denoted in bold

=== Television ===
- Star Trek: The Animated Series (1974)
- The Secrets of Isis (1975)
- Space Sentinels (1977)
- The New Archie and Sabrina Hour (1977)
- Tarzan, Lord of the Jungle (1978)
- Web Woman (1978)
- Wonder Woman (1978)
- Godzilla (1979)
- Buck Rogers in the 25th Century (1980)
- Space Stars (1981)
- The Biskitts (1983)
- The Smurfs (1983)
- He-Man and the Masters of the Universe (1983)
- Mighty Orbots (1984)
- The Transformers (1985–1987)
- Defenders of the Earth (1986)
- Kissyfur (1986)
- My Little Pony (1986)
- **Teenage Mutant Ninja Turtles** (1987–1996): seasons 4-5 and 8-9 head writer
- Dinosaucers (1987)
- Jem (1987)
- Spiral Zone (1987)
- Starcom: The U.S. Space Force (1987)
- COPS (1988)
- Chip 'n Dale: Rescue Rangers (1989)
- James Bond Jr. (1991)
- Batman: The Animated Series (1992)
- Battletoads (1992)
- **Cadillacs and Dinosaurs** (1993)
- **The New Adventures of Speed Racer** (1993)
- Transformers: Generation 2 (1993)
- Conan and the Young Warriors (1994)
- **Wild C.A.T.s** (1994)
- **Mighty Ducks: The Animated Series** (1996)
- The New Adventures of Zorro (1997)

=== Film ===
- Beastmaster III: The Eye of Braxus (1996)
