= Crown (manga) =

Manga by Shinji Wada and Yui Higuri

- Cover of Crown volume 1 as published by Akita Shoten

クラウン (Kuraun)
- Genre: Action, Romance
- Manga
- Written by: Shinji Wada
- Illustrated by: You Higuri
- Published by: Akita Shoten
- English publisher: NA: Go! Comi
- Magazine: Princess Gold
- Original run: August 16, 2005 – August 16, 2008
- Volumes: 6

Crown (Japanese: クラウン, Hepburn: Kuraun) is a manga series written by Shinji Wada and illustrated by You Higuri. Crown was serialized in the shōjo manga magazine, Princess Gold magazine around 2005. The 14 chapters and 6 volumes were published in Japan, France, Germany and other countries. The first 2 volumes were published in the United States in 2009 by Go! Comi, which officially shut down in May 2010.

== Plot ==
Its main character Mahiro Shinomiya gets kidnapped by two strangers, who turn out to be her lost brother Rem and his friend Jack. With them she also discovers that she's of royal blood and the rightful heiress to the throne of a small (fictional) central-Asian country called "Regalia". This state is currently ruled by the ruthless but extremely influential Fibyura, who is Mahiro's and Rem's father's second wife, who cannot attend to his governmental duties, as he is mortally ill. As it seems impossible to get Mahiro on the throne legally, she and her two allies start a small war against Fibyura's hired troops and notorious military leader "Condor", which endangers everybody involved.

== Manga ==
While in hiatus from writing Cantarella, You Higuri started working along with Shinji Wada on Crown, which started to be published on August 16, 2005, in Princess Gold, and lasted until August 16, 2008. It was published by Akita Shoten into six tankōbon volumes between December 16, 2005, and October 16, 2008.

In July 2008, at the Anime Expo, Go! Comi announced it had licensed the series for an English-language release. The first volume was released on December 15, 2008, and the second on April 7, 2009, before Go! Comi officially shut down in May 2010. It has been also licensed in Germany by Carlsen Comics, and in France by Asuka.

=== Volume list ===
No.	Original release date	Original ISBN	English release date	English ISBN
1	December 16, 2005	978-4-253-15374-4	December 15, 2008	978-1605100050
2	May 16, 2006	978-4-253-15375-1	April 7, 2009	978-1605100067
3	March 16, 2007	978-4-253-15376-8	—	—
4	October 16, 2007	978-4-253-15377-5	—	—
5	March 14, 2008	978-4-253-15378-2	—	—
6	October 16, 2008	978-4-253-15379-9	—	—
