= Ichijō =

一条 or 一條
- Romanization: Ichijō
- Language: Japanese

Origin
- Meaning: first street

Ichijō (一条 or 一條) literally means first street in Japanese. It can refer to:

- Emperor Ichijō (一条天皇 -tennō), the 66th Emperor of Japan (980–1011)

== Japanese surname ==
- The Ichijō family (一条家 -ke), one of the five regent houses (go-sekke) of the Fujiwara clan in Japan
- Kazuya Ichijō, a Japanese voice actor

== Fictional characters ==
- Kaoru Ichijou of Kamen Rider Kuuga
- Mashiro Ichijō of After School Nightmare.
- Hikaru Ichijō of the Super Dimension Fortress Macross.
- Ichijō of Pani Poni
- Eika Ichijō of Sky Girls
- Sumireko Ichijō and Kaoruko Ichijō of Futakoi
- Takuma Ichijō of Vampire Knight
- Kou Ichijō of Persona 4
- Haruhiko Ichijō of Myriad Colors Phantom World
- Hotaru Ichijō of Non Non Biyori
- Supreme Commander Ichijō of Choujin Sentai Jetman
- Ryōma Ichijō of Love Stage!!
- Raku Ichijō of Nisekoi
- Ichijō Ayane of Full Metal Daemon: Muramasa (“Ichijō” being used as a given name)
- Aoi Ichijō of High School Prodigies Have It Easy Even in Another World

== Places ==
- Ichijō Street (一条通, -dori), one of numbered east–west streets in the ancient capital of Heian-kyō, present-day Kyoto
