= Starcom: The U.S. Space Force =

13-episode animated syndicated television series

- StarCom: The U.S. Space Force title card
- Created by: Brynne Stephens
- Developed by: Brynne Stephens
- Written by: Arthur Byron Cover; Barbara Hambly; Lydia Marano; Richard Mueller; Steve Perry; Michael Reaves; Brynne Stephens; David Wise; Marv Wolfman
- Directed by: Marek Buchwald
- Voices of: Philip Akin; Yank Azman; Robert Cait; Rob Cowan; Don Francks; Susan Roman
- Theme music composer: Udi Harpaz
- Countries of origin: United States; Canada
- Original language: English
- No. of episodes: 13

Production
- Executive producer: Andy Heyward
- Producer: Richard Raynis
- Running time: 25 minutes
- Production company: DIC Animation City

Original release
- Network: Syndication
- Release: 20 September – 13 December 1987

Starcom: The U.S. Space Force is a 13-episode animated syndicated television series inspired by a motorized toy franchise manufactured by Coleco. The characters were adapted for animation by series creator Brynne Stephens, who also story edited the show. Starcom was produced by DIC Animation City and distributed by Coca-Cola Telecommunications. The toyline was popular in Europe and Asia, but was unsuccessful in the North American domestic market.

The show earned poor ratings and was cancelled after 13 episodes. The series was rerun in the late 1990s as part of DIC and Pax TV's "Cloud Nine" programming strand, and on KBHK in the fall of 1994.

== Plot ==
Set in the near future, the series details the adventures of the United States Space Force, a military organization engaged in an ongoing conflict with the technologically advanced Shadow Force, led by Emperor Dark.

== Cast ==
Colonels: John "Slim" Griffin (Starbase Command), Paul "Crowbar" Corbin (Astro Marines), James "Dash" Derringer (Star Wing)

=== Starcom ===
- Philip Akin: Colonel John "Slim" Griffin
- Yank Azman: Shock Troopers
- Robert Cait: Colonel Paul "Crowbar" Corbin
- Rob Cowan: Colonel James "Dash" Derringer
- Don Francks: Admiral Franklin Brickley
- Susan Roman: Lieutenant Kelsey Carver

=== Shadow Force ===
- Louis DiBianco: Major Romak
- Marvin Goldhar: General Von Dar
- Dan Hennessey: Major Klag
- Elva Mai Hoover: Malvanna Wilde
- Robert Cait: General Torvek
- Neil Munro: Emperor Dark

== Development ==
Starcom was developed with the help of the Young Astronauts' Council, with the original intention of sparking young viewers' interest in the NASA Space Program.

== Toys ==
The Starcom toyline consisted of 23 figures, 6 playsets and 13 vehicles on the U.S. Space Force side, while the Shadow Force was represented by 15 figures and 11 vehicles. The two inch tall action figures were packaged with a backpack, a weapon, and an identification card that profiled the character and explained the capabilities of their equipment.

The action figures were marketed as having a Magna Lock feature, which consisted of small magnets in their feet, allowing them to more easily stand on playsets and vehicles. This feature also allowed for the activation of mechanisms built into the playsets, such as an automatically rising elevator or a rocket firing cannon.

Playsets and vehicles additionally featured wind-up mechanisms advertised as a Power Deploy feature. These mechanisms allowed the toys to perform various actions at the touch of a button, such as deploying wings or extending weapons.

The Starcom toyline was unsuccessful in the U.S. due to poor promotion and the short lived nature of its tie-in series. The line was discontinued after two years in the U.S. but fared better in Europe and Southeast Asia, where both the show and the toys continued to be popular long after the American toys were discontinued. In the non-U.S. regions Mattel took over production and promotion of the line, removing the U.S. flag and NASA details from the Coleco originals and relaunched the toys with a second line of promotions in the early 1990s.

== Episodes ==
No.	Title	Written by	Original release date
1	"Nantucket Sleighride"	Richard Mueller	September 20, 1987
2	"Trojan Crowbar"	Steve Perry	September 27, 1987
3	"The Long Fall"	Brynne Stephens	October 4, 1987
4	"Caverns of Mars"	Michael Reaves	October 11, 1987
5	"Fire and Ice"	Michael Reaves	October 18, 1987
6	"Galactic Heartbeat"	Steve Perry	October 25, 1987
7	"The Boys Who Cried Dark"	Richard Mueller	November 1, 1987
8	"Dark Harvest"	Lydia Marano and Arthur Byron Cover	November 8, 1987
9	"A Few Bugs in the System"	Barbara Hambly	November 15, 1987
10	"Turnabout"	Marv Wolfman	November 22, 1987
11	"Hot Enough for You?"	Steve Perry	November 29, 1987
12	"Flash Moskowitz, Space Cadet"	David Wise	December 26, 1987
13	"The Last Star Ranger"	Steve Perry and Richard Mueller	December 13, 1987

Note: Most of the episodes were not broadcast in order of production; "The Long Fall" is actually the series pilot.

=== Home media ===
In 2003, Sterling Entertainment released Starcom: The Search for Aliens on DVD containing three episodes.

In 2015, Mill Creek Entertainment released Starcom: The U.S. Space Force - The Complete Series on DVD in Region 1 for the very first time.

=== Other media ===
A 24-page long picture book Starcom: Doom in Space was released by Golden Books in 1998 (story by Dwight Jon Zimmerman and art by Gene Biggs).

== Reception ==
The Encyclopedia of Science Fiction notes that the show emphasized tactical space combat and made a notable effort to incorporate quasi-realistic space physics; the latter was partially tied to the features of the associated toyline (such as magnetic boots of toy figures). Stylistically and thematically, the show reflects a technocratic, US-centric late-Cold-War optimism about space-based military power rather than the mythic or cosmic framing found in contemporary Japanese anime. Despite modest success in the United States which led to its early cancellation after 13 episodes, the series achieved greater popularity overseas, and occupies an intermediate position between purely episodic action cartoons and later serialized Western military science-fiction animation.
