= Three in Love =

Japanese manga series

- Cover of the first volume of Three in Love as published by Akita Shoten

3人で愛しあいましょ? (Sannin de Koishi Aimashou?)
- Genre: Romantic comedy
- Manga
- Written by: Shioko Mizuki
- Published by: Akita Shoten
- English publisher: NA: Go! Comi
- Magazine: Princess
- Original run: 2000 – 6 June 2002
- Volumes: 5

Three in Love (Japanese: 3人で愛しあいましょ?, Hepburn: Sannin de Koishi Aimashou?; lit. Love Among Three People?) is a shōjo manga series written and illustrated by Shioko Mizuki. It was originally serialized in Akita Shoten's Princess magazine between the March 2000 issue, and 6 June 2002. In December 2007, Go! Comi announced their license of Three in Love at the annual New York Anime Festival.

== Release dates ==
Japanese volumes

1. 21 September 2001
2. 15 March 2001
3. 4 October 2001
4. 20 March 2002
5. 22 August 2002

English volumes

1. 1 July 2008
2. 30 November 2008
3. 31 March 2009
