= Dragon Eye (manga) =

Manga

- Cover of the first manga volume

龍眼－ドラゴンアイ－ (Ryū Gan -Doragon Ai-)
- Manga
- Written by: Kairi Fujiyama
- Published by: Kodansha
- English publisher: NA: Del Rey Manga
- Magazine: Monthly Shōnen Sirius
- Original run: 2005 – 2008
- Volumes: 9

Dragon Eye (Japanese: 龍眼－ドラゴンアイ－, Hepburn: Ryū Gan -Doragon Ai-) is a Japanese manga written and illustrated by Kairi Fujiyama. The manga was serialized in Kodansha's manga magazine, Monthly Shōnen Sirius. The manga is licensed in North America by Del Rey Manga. Since early 2008, the series has been on hiatus in Japan, apparently due to the creator's illness. The manga features a squadron of fighters (called VIUS)who are immune to "D-virus" and the Dracule which is a group of creatures who spread the "D-virus". The series has continued under the name Dragon Eye RT (龍眼RT) in Japanese and has released about 4 volumes.

Dragon Eye was ranked equal fourth with Black Sun, Silver Moon and Zombie-Loan on an About.com's reader poll for the best shōnen manga of 2007. It was also nominated as one of Young Adult Library Services Association's 2008 Great Graphic Novels.

== Plot ==
Forty years ago a terrible virus spread throughout the world, and people and animals alike were infected and transformed into horrible monsters that eat the flesh and drink the blood of the uninfected. These creatures were henceforth known as "Dracules" (after the famous vampire) and what created them the "D-virus". Even worse, because the virus affects the sufferer immediately, a cure has never been developed; the only way to "save" its victims is to kill them. Luckily, there are those who were born with an immunity to the D-virus - they are the VIUS, a Dracule elimination force based in the city of Mikuni (三國) who safeguard humanity from extinction.

== Characters ==
=== Squadron Zero ===
Squadron Zero (零番隊, Rei-Bantai) is known for being "dangerous, difficult and its captain detested". It is a squadron branch of Troop Mizora of the Enforcement Corps.

Issa Kazuma (珂妻 一叉, Kazuma Issa)
The leader of Squad Zero, Issa is light-hearted and appears to be very lazy. However, when it comes down to battle, he is very competent. He wields the broadsword Diamond Sacred Steel though he possesses amazing melee skills that appears Dracule-like. Issa, unknown to many of the VIUS, possesses a "Dragon Eye" in his forehead and is forced to wear fetters, spell tablets, which limit his power, otherwise the power runs amok. He is even able to sense the number and strength of Dracules. He has been with the VIUS for a number of years despite his youthful appearance and no one seems to remember when he joined. However, due to his personality and unusual behavior many people in the VIUS despise Issa, including some of Issa's ex-squad members, one admitting that they lost trust in Issa because they didn't think he was human. Issa is looking for his older sister, Ciara, who was taken hostage by the Dracules who forced him to fight for them before he joined the VIUS. During Issa's time with the Dracules, he was known as "Leda" which is the title given to particularly ferocious Dracules; it means "Ogre Child". Issa is first seen in the VIUS entrance examination, as an undercover examiner playing what appears to be a PSP. After Issa escaped he ran into the man who saved Leila and traveled with him for a while. The man became a dracule due to his eye which he gave to Issa along with his weapon saying if he wanted to stay human he'd used his sword. Issa took up residency in Mikuni.
Leila Mikami (三神 レイラ, Mikami Reira)
Leila is a D-virus orphan. Her parents were killed by Dracules when she was young but was saved by a man with a "Dragon Eye"-which is her reason for entering VIUS. She originally wished to have a "Dragon Eye" for herself to become the most powerful warrior in the world to exact revenge on the creatures that took her family, but due to Issa's revealing of his "Dragon Eye" she sees how much it costs to have one and swears to use her power to protect everyone's smiling faces. Issa promises to one day let her have his "Dragon Eye" if she still requires the power. She wields a single katana and practices the act of Sacred Blade, Shimon School. She was her years top scorer and is personally selected by Issa to join the new squad Zero. Leila is the first recruit at VIUS assigned to the new Squad Zero. She may be developing feelings for Issa because she was crying after he returned from the cave and she was one of the only people who trusted him. Another reason that she may be developing feelings for him is because when she found out he was in the tournament she said to him "If I had known we could have prepared together. Leila looked disappointed when she asked him did he have a crush on Aoi. She also believes Issa's "Dragon Eye" to be the same one as the man who saved her.
Sōsei Yukimura (雪村 双世, Yukimura Sōsei)
Sōsei is a former member of Squad Five that has recently temporarily transferred to Squad Zero. He believes that Issa killed his twin sister six years ago and transferred for this reason to learn more about the truth. He wields twin blades in her memory. After confronting Issa, and learning the truth of his sister's death, he planned to resign; but instead was permanently transferred into Squad Zero by Issa. This is his second year in VIUS. He was his years top scorer.

=== Squadron One ===
Squadron One (壱番隊, Ichi-Bantai) is a squadron branch of Troop Mizora of the Enforcement Corps.

Shun'ichi Sakuraba (桜庭 瞬一, Sakuraba Shun'ichi)
Squad One captain who lost his left arm to his infected partner. An Ex-member of the old Zero Squad who still has a fairly decent relationship with Issa. Is often seen apologizing/covering for Issa, along with beating him. He is said to be the strongest person in Mikuni but is not on active duty. It is mentioned in the first chapter that this may be due to a blunder that he made on his first mission.

=== Squadron Two ===
Squadron Two (弐番隊, Ni-Bantai) is a squadron branch of Troop Mizora of the Enforcement Corps.

Kajiyama (梶山)
A volunteer helper on loan for Squad Zero. He once went on a mission with Issa where they ended up hovering on the brink of death in a snow storm. He is specialized with ammo and grapples but uses rigged shells he invented himself that he fires from his hand-held cannon. He is known for his own inventions that prove to be somewhat obscure. Kajiyama admits to Leila that he was kicked out of the house by his father and forced to go earn a living, and does not plan to stay in VIUS. Apparently he has many brothers and sisters.

=== Squadron Three ===
Squadron Three (弐番隊, San-Bantai) is a squadron branch of Troop Chihiro of the Enforcement Corps.

Tadanaka Myōjin (妙仁 忠中, Myōjin Tadanaka)
Sazanami (漣)
Volunteer helper on loan for Squad Zero. He wields a waistband whip containing spell power.
Ranran Yume (湯女 嵐蘭, Yume Ranran)
A former Squad Zero member. She has a bright, cheerful personality as well as a great body that is muscular and yet still shapely. Not one to rely on weapons, she engages in direct physical attacks, specializing in underhanded moves like the one she used to trap Issa in volume 7. Even so, she was defeated by Issa, though she only fought him to try to convince Issa to lose the competition as it is a trap intended for him.

=== Squadron Five ===
Squadron Five (伍番隊, Go-Bantai) is a squadron branch of Troop Chihiro of the Enforcement Corps.

Kiura (鬼浦)

=== Squadron Six ===
Squadron Six (陸番隊, Roku-Bantai) is a squadron branch of Troop Kazan of the Enforcement Corps.

Shizue Aoi (葵 静絵, Aoi Shizue)
Captain of Squad Six which is used for undercover missions. She is called Mikuni VIUS's most beautiful warrior. She seems to get along well with Issa which is rare compared to the other captains. She is Hibiki's foster mother.
Masamune Hibiki (響 政宗, Hibiki Masamune)
Hibiki has the appearance of a calm, cool, collected young man, but he has really completed several hundred missions. He was inducted into VIUS when he was 10 years old and was immediately placed in Sakuraba's Squad One, later transferring to Squad Six. He volunteers with the short-handed Squad Zero and is mission sub-commander, taking the position as commander when Captain Issa is separated from the group. He reveals that he thinks someone is a superior leader due to his instincts and not sticking with the manual when in combat. With his hands alone Hibiki can destroy a medium-sized Dracule and deal heavy blows. He can wield two giant blades simultaneously which he calls his 'Branched Fangs" which he carries on his back in two-sword style. He appears to become battle hungry once he meets strong "prey" among Dracules and becomes a tad wild. Hibiki gets really angry and fierce when his own blood is drawn.

=== Squadron Seven ===
Squadron Seven (質番隊, Shichi-Bantai) is a squadron branch of the Enforcement Corps.

Nanbu (南武)
Volunteer helper on loan for Squad Zero. An expert at unarmed combat, but can cast certain spells as well for a brief period of time. His short staff can serve to enhance his spell power.

=== Squadron Eight ===
Squadron Eight (捌番隊, Hachi-Bantai) is a squadron branch of the Enforcement Corps.

Jūbe'e Ino'o (猪尾 重兵衛, Inoo Jūbee)
Kyōko Rin (厘 京己, Rin Kyōko)
A member of old Squad Zero. She is a spellcaster who knows the reason why the old Squad Zero was disbanded. She can stop and even inflict damage on an opponent without touching them.

=== Squadron Ten ===
Squadron Ten (情報部, Jō-Bantai) is a squadron branch of the Enforcement Corps.

Shō Koiai (小井藍 修, Koiai Shō)
Rokurō Hyuga (日向 録郎, Hyūga Rokurō)
A member of the Intelligence Corps, he has little battle experience. He idolizes Issa, mostly because his first mission was with him. He was one of the members on the mission to kill Sosei's sister, and withdrew from the front lines because he could not handle it.

=== Dracule ===
Dracules (異形種, Dorakuru) are group of creatures that are the main target of VIUS. Their intellect, battle capabilities and overall threat to people depend on their level. Level five dracules are the lowest ranks of all dracules and they possess low intellect, making them incapable of speaking. Level one dracules have human-like intellect and are capable of speech.

Kaligera (闇彩鳥, Karigera)
A Level-2 Dracule that was smuggled into Mikuni as a black market good. He is a massive bird that is capable of human speech. Under his feathers is the rare, indestructible "Diamond Skin". Issa once made a deal with him long ago to fight with him another day. When he met Issa in Mikuni, they flew far out of the city and fought. Issa revealed the "Dragon Eye" and dove through Kaligera, removing his heart.
Daraku (陀烙)
Daraku are a mysterious group who are inciting the dracules to attack humans. They have mysterious powers and know about the Dragon Eye.They have declared VIUS the dracules enemy.

== Manga ==
Dragon Eye is written and illustrated by Kairi Fujiyama. Kodansha published the manga's 9 tankōbon between December 22, 2005, and February 22, 2008. The manga is licensed in North America by Del Rey Manga, which released the first volume in June 2007.

== Reception ==
Dragon Eye was ranked equal fourth with Black Sun, Silver Moon and Zombie-Loan on an About.com's reader poll for the best shōnen manga of 2007. Dragon Eye was nominated as one of Young Adult Library Services Association's 2008 Great Graphic Novels. Anime News Network's Theron Martin commends the manga for its "good artistry despite generic design, lots and lots of action" but criticises it for "zero originality or freshness, little character development". Mania.com's Sakura Eries criticises the manga for its excessive use of speedlines saying, "unfortunately, between the speed lines and the "blurred" depictions of weapons in motion, it's difficult to distinguish who is being hit by what in certain panels". Comics Worth Reading's Ed Sizemore commends the characterisation of Leila as "a wonderful blend of passion, seriousness, honesty, and naivete". He also commends the fight scenes for being "dynamic and fluid". A later review by Sizemore commends Kairi Fujiyama's storytelling for being able to "blend the background material into the narrative. As the characters face various challenges, they are reminded of situations in their past, leading to a flashback sequence". Coolstreak Comics' Julie Gray comments that the manga "reminds me a lot of Bleach in both style and feel". She criticises the manga for its dialogue saying, "in some places the dialogue didn't always flow very well or make sense even though the storyline itself is engaging". Active Anime's Scott Campbell commends the fast pacing of the manga which "results in a "never a dull moment" kind of feel to the series". He also recommends the manga to "any Naruto or Bleach enthusiast". Jason Thompson's appendix to Manga: The Complete Guide comments on the manga's "clear Naruto influence" through the "pseudo-Asian setting and the central character dynamic". He also comments that "despite lots of swords slashing around, the series is low on violence, as the Dracules turn to smoke when killed".
