= Dinosaucers =

Television series

- Title screen
- Genre: Action
- Created by: Michael E. Uslan
- Written by: Diane Duane; Brynne Stephens; Lydia C. Marano
- Directed by: Stephan Martinière
- Starring: Len Carlson; Rob Cowan; Marvin Goldhar; Dan Hennessey; Ray Kahnert; Gordon Masten; Don McManus; Barbara Lynn Redpath; Simon Reynolds; John Stocker; Leslie Toth; Louise Vallance; Chris Wiggins; Thick Wilson; Richard Yearwood
- Composers: Haim Saban; Shuki Levy
- Countries of origin: United States; Canada
- Original language: English
- No. of seasons: 1
- No. of episodes: 65

Production
- Executive producers: Andy Heyward; Benjamin Melniker; Michael E. Uslan
- Producer: Michael Maliani
- Running time: 22 minutes
- Production companies: DIC Enterprises; Lightyear Entertainment; Coca-Cola Telecommunications

Original release
- Network: Syndication
- Release: September 14 – December 11, 1987

Dinosaucers is a 1987 animated series developed and produced by DIC Enterprises in association with Lightyear Entertainment and Coca-Cola Telecommunications. The show was created by producer Michael E. Uslan, who considered it a "harebrained idea". Even though it ran for only one season, it did manage to run for a total of 65 episodes as ordered to be a 13-week-long series, when it aired on first-run syndication.

== Plot ==
"Ryan: We used to be four ordinary teenagers, until one day...we met some new friends...from out of town. They were called... Dinosaucers! My friends and I became the Secret Scouts! Allies to these Dinosaucers from outer space and joined in their battles against Genghis Rex and the evil Tyrannos!
Ankylo: The Dinosaucers are leaving Bossasaur (snort!)
Genghis: Well, follow them!"

— opening narration

The show follows the Dinosaucers and their battles against the evil Tyrannos. Each group is composed of intelligent anthropomorphic dinosaurs or other prehistoric saurian species. The Dinosaucers are also allied with four humans known as the Secret Scouts. The two groups come from a planet in a counter-Earth orbit known as Reptilon. Most of the characters are named after the type of prehistoric animal they are based on, or some pun of the name.

Both groups have a central base of operations. The Dinosaucers' base is called Lava Dome and is located in a mountain area in a dormant volcano. The Tyrannos' base is located under a tar pit which is next to an abandoned amusement park. Each of the groups' members—save for Teryx and Terrible Dactyl who can themselves fly—have flying ships in which they can travel and do battle. Most ships actually resemble the personae of their respective owners. Along with their individual ships, both groups have a large mothership of sorts as well.

=== Dinovolving ===
All the Dinosaucers have a button on the front of their uniforms which instantly devolves them to their primitive ancestors' dinosaur state, while retaining their intelligence and ability to speak English. This special ability is called Dinovolving and initially appeared to be a significant element of the series, as both Allo and Bronto Thunder Dinovolved in the first episode. Despite the apparent technological advantage, most of the later episodes featured no Dinovolving. Stego and Teryx were the only Dinosaucers who would never Dinovolve throughout the series, while Allo, Tricero, Bonehead, and Bronto Thunder would use the ability in more than one episode.

The Tyrannos do not have the secret of Dinovolving, and a few episodes even revolve around their plans to steal the technology somehow, but they do possess a special raygun called a devolver. Blasting a living creature with this weapon has the same "devolving" effect as Dinovolving, but reduces the victim's intelligence to that of the devolved form. For those from Reptilon, the form is that of a normal dinosaur, while humans are reverted to primitive cavemen. In any case, the device often winds up being used against them, to much comedic effect, rather than on the Dinosaucers. In this fashion, Genghis Rex, Ankylo, Quackpot, and Brachio were all changed into primitive dinosaurs at various times in the series. The Tyrannos also possess a weapon called a "fossilizer", which is capable of turning its target into stone, as well as reversing the condition. The Dinosaucers were also shown to have access to this particular type of weapon in one episode, though it may have been on loan from the Tyrannos, as both factions had united to battle a group of anthropomorphic sabertooth tigers, who also hailed from Reptilon. These creatures possessed fossilizers as well, and also had a device which could disrupt the equivalent weapons belonging to the Dinosaucers and Tyrannos while leaving their own in perfect working order.

== Characters ==
=== Dinosaucers ===
- Allo (voiced by Len Carlson) is an Allosaurus and the leader of the Dinosaucers. He has a wife, named Vera, a daughter, named Alloetta, and a maid named Gatormaid (a play on Gatorade). He is the nephew of the Dinosorceror and Dinosorceress, rulers of Reptilon. He can dinovolve into a 40-foot form.
- Dimetro (voiced by Chris Wiggins) is a Dimetrodon who is a member of the Dinosaucers and Allo's assistant. Dimetro is the scientist and mechanic of the group.
- Bronto Thunder (voiced by Marvin Goldhar): A Brontosaurus, Bronto Thunder has a girlfriend named Apatty Saurus and was a "rep" for a ceramic tile shop, before he became a Dinosaucer. He is physically considered the strongest of the Dinosaucers and can Dinovolve into an 80-foot form.
- Stego (voiced by Ray Kahnert) is a Stegosaurus and a quite dim-witted recruit, when compared to the rest of the team. He tries to be brave, but is prone to panic attacks and general cowardice. Stego is a very powerful hand-to-hand combatant who does not realize his own strength.
- Tricero (voiced by Rob Cowan): A Triceratops, he had a history of doing investigative work back on Reptilon, serving in the Tricerocops. Tricero has a vibrational super-power that emanates from his 2 brow horns. He can Dinovolve into a 30-foot form.
- Bonehead (voiced by Marvin Goldhar) is a Pachycephalosaurus who is the nephew of Allo. He is good-natured and innocent, though unintelligent. Bonehead can dinovolve into a 25-foot form.
- Ichy (voiced by Thick Wilson) is an Ichthyosaurus with the ability to communicate with sea creatures. Throughout the series, initially oblivious of her mutuality, he forms a couple with Teryx. He can Dinovolve into a 30-foot form.
- Teryx (voiced by Louise Vallance) is the only female Dinosaucer. She is an evolved Archaeopteryx who possesses the innate ability to communicate with birds. Teryx has a crush on Ichy, but because she is a flying creature, whereas Ichy is aquatic, she fears it will not work out. She, however, comes around it and gains confidence in herself as the series progresses, even forming a pair with Ichy, since the episode "For the Love of Teryx".

=== Secret Scouts ===
The Secret Scouts are four teenage humans who help the Dinosaucers as allies. According to the opening credits, they met them when they first arrived and gained powers through magic rings they were given. They are some of the closest friends the Dinosaucers have while they are on Earth.

The Secret Scouts. From left to right: Sara, Paul, Ryan and David

- Ryan Spencer (voiced by Simon Reynolds) is a blond-haired boy, who is apparently the most intelligent and athletic of the group. He seems not to get into quite as much trouble as his three friends do.
- Sara Spencer (voiced by Barbara Lynn Redpath) is a blond-haired girl and the younger sister of Ryan, as well as the only girl of the Secret Scouts. She is quite athletic and informative, often teaching the Dinosaucers Earth-related notions. Sara's ring gives her increased speed and agility.
- Paul (voiced by Richard Yearwood) is an intelligent bespectacled African-American boy. He seems to find the Dinosaucers thrilling and fun. He also has a pet dog, named Charlie, who sometimes causes a lot of trouble for the Dinosaucers in multiple episodes. His Scout ring lets him run at enhanced speed over long distances.
- David (voiced by Leslie Toth) is a black-haired boy and the wild one of the Scouts. He often gets into trouble and makes matters worse by getting the Dinosaucers involved in his "act-first and think-second" tactics. He is strong and athletic, and although he does not quite have the sharp intellect of Paul and Ryan, he is creative and a quick thinker. David's ring increases his strength, allowing him to lift several hundred pounds at once.

=== Tyrannos ===
The Evil Tyrannos. From left to right: Styraco, Plesio, Genghis Rex, Quackpot, Brachio, Ankylo and Terrible Dactyl

The Tyrannos are the forces of "evil" in the series and, like the Dinosaucers, have a total of 8 members in their group. During the course of the series, Plesio, Terrible Dactyl and Quackpot would all betray Genghis Rex at least once over matters of conscience. Despite this, they would eventually return to Rex's side out of loyalty to his cause.

- Genghis Rex (voiced by Dan Hennessey): is the primary antagonist of the series. He is a Tyrannosaurus who is the leader of the Tyrannos, as well as the evil counterpart of Allo. Living up to his species' reputation, he is brutal and tyrannical and has a violent temper. Genghis Rex has deep feelings for Teryx and even attempted to kidnap and marry her, but she resisted, since she was in love with Ichy and objected to his ways.
- Dei (voiced by Louise Vallance) is a Deinonychus who is the older sister of Rex and the only female Tyranno. Almost as strong as her younger brother, but more intelligent and agile, she demonstrates considerable skill in battle. She also constantly scolds her brother when things go wrong, something no other Tyranno has the courage to do.
- Ankylo (voiced by John Stocker) is an Ankylosaurus who is the assistant of Rex. Ankylo bears a resemblance to a warthog and exhibits pig-like characteristics, often snorting when he speaks. He wears grey armor and has red skin and a special weapon called the Anklebuster, which creates a chain made out of energy.
- Quackpot (voiced by Len Carlson) is an Anatosaurus who is the practical joker of the group, much to the ire of the other Tyrannos. In episode 63, Quackpot was the star of a children's television show back on Reptilon called Duckbill's Playhouse under the name T.B. Duckbill. Therefore, he objects to harming children and even sometimes protects and cares for them.
- Brachio (voiced by Don McManus) is a Brachiosaurus who is the archetypal thug of the gang. He is physically the strongest among the Tyrannos, yet he follows Rex's orders to the letter and (although not at the same degree of stupidity as Bonehead) is not very bright.
- Styraco (voiced by Gordon Masten) is a Styracosaurus and former dentist. He is intelligent and sometimes works with machines, though not as often as Plesio. Like Ankylo, he is extremely loyal to Rex. He is sensitive to mental pressure and can behave in a deranged way when pushed to the brink of his sanity.
- Plesio (voiced by Dan Hennessey) is an evolved Plesiosaurus and former attorney with the ability to communicate with sea creatures. He serves as the scientist and inventor of the group. Of all of the Tyrannos, he seems to be the most distant from Rex.
- Terrible Dactyl (voiced by John Stocker) is a Pterodactylus who sports a crest akin to a Pteranodon and a long rhamphorhynchoid-style tail. He has a soft spot for baby pterosaurs and even once helped the Dinosaucers protect some Pteranodon eggs in the episode Eggs Marks the Spot, showing that there is some good in this mostly evil-willed being after all. Also, he is of a more sporting nature than the other Tyrannos and will sometimes leave a conflict voluntarily if his side has an unfair advantage in numbers.

=== Minor characters ===
- The Dinosorcerer and Dinosorceress are the leaders of Reptilon. Dinosorcerer is a Megalosaurus and Dinosorceress is a Plateosaurus. They prefer to rule at arm's length, staying out of the squabbles of the Dinosaucers and Tyrannos as parents would their children.
- Apatty Saurus is an Apatosaurus who was Bronto Thunder's girlfriend on Reptilon. She is an expert swamp boater and became a partner at the Color Rep-Tiles tile shop, where Bronto Thunder once worked, sometime after Bronto left for Earth.
- Major Clifton is an U.S. Air Force officer who is trying to discover the truth about the Dinosaucers at the expense of his reputation.
- The Furballs: Ugh (voiced by John Stocker) and Grunt are furry creatures who are equivalent to quite-intelligent pets on Reptilon. They get into trouble more often than not in each episode in which they appear, but end up saving the day for the Dinosaucers since Tyrannos are allergic to them.
- Captain Sabretooth and Smilin'Don are a pair of Smilodon space pirates with advanced weapons that rival Reptilon's, like a device that neutralizes the Dinosaucers' and Tyrannos' Fossilizers. They are part of a group called the 'Sabretooths' where it is said that they were invaders of Reptilon, according to the Dinosaucers, though both Captain Sabretooth and Smilin' Don seem to state that Reptilon was their home. Either way, it took all of Reptilon to get and keep the Sabretooths off the planet. They can be fended off with catnip, a little gift Sara gives to the Dinosaucers and Tyrannos in order to keep them away afterwards.
- Nessie is an Elasmosaurus who served as inspiration for the Loch Ness Monster. Upon meeting him, she falls in love with Plesio, and though Genghis Rex plans to turn her into a member of the Tyrannos, Plesio loves her to the point of denying Rex's command and even defossilizes the Dinosaucers to help free her. Even though she is offered to become a Dinosaucer, she declines.
- Dinosaur Dundy, real name Joseph Dunderback, is an Australian scientist obsessed with studying biology. He once studied the lifeforms in a swamp, but changed his focus and started to study dinosaurs.
- Turtleback and Shellhead are two mutated Earthling turtles who are some of Dinosaur Dundy's closest friends. They have cheerful personalities and goodwill. Dundy refers to them as "two of the slipperiest characters he has ever met".
- Crockpot is a mutated Earthling crocodile for whom Dinosaur Dundy has cared since it was a hatchling.
- Marty and Snake Eyes are two mutated Earth snakes who are friends of Dinosaur Dundy.

== Episodes ==
Stephan Martinieri directed all episodes.

| No. | Title | Written by | Original release date |
|---|---|---|---|
| 1 | "Dinosaur Valley" | Diane Duane | September 14, 1987 |
The Tyrannos discover a hidden valley full of tech-cancelling ore and dinosaurs. The Dinosaucers head down to stop the Tyrannos from building a base there.
| 2 | "Take Us Out to the Ballgame" | Michael E. Uslan | September 15, 1987 |
The Secret Scouts teach the Dinosaucers how to play baseball while the Tyrannos search for the world's biggest diamond.
| 3 | "Happy Egg Day to You" | Diane Duane | September 16, 1987 |
The Secret Scouts and Dinosaucers plan a surprise party for Paul while the Tyrannos infiltrate Lavadome to steal the secret of dinovolving.
| 4 | "Hooray for Hollywood" | Felicia Maliani | September 17, 1987 |
Stego and Bonehead go to Hollywood to meet the dinosaurs they think are there, while Genghis Rex and Ankylo plan to recruit those dinosaurs.
| 5 | "Divide and Conquer" | Michael E. Uslan | September 18, 1987 |
The Tyrannos fake news about a new energy source in New York in order to get Allo away from the Dinosaucers. Bronto Thunder goes to New York against Allo's orders.
| 6 | "A Real Super Hero" | Brooks Wachtel | September 21, 1987 |
Sara and Bonehead go to Hollywood to meet their favorite TV superhero, Mr. Hero, but the Tyrannos go to Hollywood too to eliminate Mr. Hero and get their claws on his weapons.
| 7 | "Burgers Up!" | Ron Harris | September 22, 1987 |
The Tyrannos steal a shipment of frozen hamburgers, mistaking them for a power source for their latest weapon.
| 8 | "Be Prepared" | Mike O'Mahony | September 23, 1987 |
The Dinosaucers and Secret Scouts go on a camping trip to hone their survival skills.
| 9 | "That Shrinking Feeling" | Doug Molitor | September 24, 1987 |
Teryx builds a 4-D ray that shrinks her, Bronto Thunder, Allo, Ryan, Sara, and the Tyrannos, leading to a miniature fight in the Spencer house.
| 10 | "Rockin' Reptiles" | Felicia Maliani | September 25, 1987 |
David uses the Dinosaucers' name and looks for his rock band, but is mistaken for the real thing by the Tyrannos.
| 11 | "Sleeping Booty" | Ron Harris, Diane Duane | September 28, 1987 |
Genghis Rex plans to recruit a giant monster to conquer Earth.
| 12 | "The First Snow" | Michael E. Uslan | September 29, 1987 |
Paul and Sara teach the Dinosaucers how to have fun in winter.
| 13 | "Trick or Cheat" | Michael E. Uslan, Diane Duane | September 30, 1987 |
The Secret Scouts practice their magic tricks, unaware that Quackpot plans to show off magic tricks of his own.
| 14 | "Defective Defector" | Doug Molitor | October 1, 1987 |
Quackpot is hit by Plesio's defector ray, causing him to join the Dinosaucers, who become the victims of Quackpot's practical jokes.
| 15 | "For the Love of Teryx" | Felicia Maliani | October 2, 1987 |
Sara helps Teryx admit her feelings for Ichy. At the same time, Genghis Rex plans on making Teryx his queen.
| 16 | "A Man's Best Friend Is His Dogasaurus" | Michael E. Uslan | October 5, 1987 |
Sara and Paul bring their pets, Missy and Charlie, to Dinosaucer HQ, but the Fur Balls give them dinosauce that turns them into dinosaurs.
| 17 | "Carnivore in Rio" | Somtow Sucharitkul | October 6, 1987 |
A tribe in the Amazon has begun misusing a Reptilon tool and the Dinosaucers and Tyrannos race to get it.
| 18 | "Frozen Fur Balls" | John Vornholt, S. Robertson | October 7, 1987 |
The Tyrannos attack a supply ship driven by Stego and Bonehead, who have only Ugh, Grunt, and their relatives to help them.
| 19 | "Hook, Line, and Stinker" | Avril Roy-Smith, Richard Mueller | October 8, 1987 |
While searching for sunken treasure, Plesio is photographed by a team of scientists. The Dinosaucers and Tyrannos rush to make sure the scientists are unsuccessful in capturing him.
| 20 | "The Prehistoric Purge" | Walt Kubiak, Eliot Daro | October 9, 1987 |
Stego becomes a wrestler known as the Prehistoric Purge, and Genghis Rex plans to kidnap the Secret Scouts at one of his matches.
| 21 | "The Truth About Dragons" | Doug Molitor | October 12, 1987 |
The Tyrannos go to China to get their claws on the country's 'superpower'. A boy named Kai mistakes them for dragons.
| 22 | "Chariots of the Dinosaucers" | Somtow Sucharitkul | October 13, 1987 |
The Tyrannos travel to Egypt and force an archeologist to help them find the tomb of Stego-Ra, the creator of dinovolving.
| 23 | "Eggs Mark the Spot" | Avril Roy-Smith, Richard Mueller | October 14, 1987 |
A nest of pteranodon eggs is discovered, and the Dinosaucers and Secret Scouts rush to get them before the Tyrannos do. Terrible Dactyl, however, wants them for his own reasons.
| 24 | "Mommy Dino-Dearest" | Brooks Wachtel | October 15, 1987 |
Bonehead's mother, Bonehilda, comes to Lavadome with a device that will prevent the Tyrannos from intercepting their communications, and Genghis Rex wants it. Meanwhile, Bonehead tries to make his mother proud by pretending to be the commander of the Dinosaucers.
| 25 | "The Whale's Song" | Durnie King | October 16, 1987 |
The Tyrannos head to the Bermuda Triangle to take a meteor that has the power to transport objects to Reptilon, and the Dinosaucers team up with the meteor's whale guardians to stop them.
| 26 | "Inquiring Minds" | Mark Cassutt | October 19, 1987 |
When Sara photographs the Dinosaucers, the pictures end up in the hands of a greedy reporter, who teams up with the Tyrannos.
| 27 | "War of the Worlds... II" | Dennis O'Flaherty | October 20, 1987 |
David's cousin Francine causes alien invaders to appear on the TV sets of her hometown, causing panic and bringing the Tyrannos, who want to ally themselves with the non-existent aliens.
| 28 | "Beach Blanket Bonehead" | Chris Bunch, Allan Cole | October 21, 1987 |
In honor of Fern Day, the Dinosaucers and Tyrannos call a 24-hour truce. The Secret Scouts take the Dinosaucers to the beach, and the Tyrannos follow.
| 29 | "The Bone Ranger and Bronto" | David Bischoff, Ted Pedersen | October 22, 1987 |
When a new dinosaur skull is found in Arizona, the Dinosaucers and Tyrannos venture there, both reenacting Reptilon's Old West days.
| 30 | "Cindersaurus" | Cherie Wilkerson | October 23, 1987 |
In order to learn more about dances, Teryx creates a device that temporarily turns her into a human.
| 31 | "Trouble in Paradise" | Martha Moran | October 26, 1987 |
While eavesdropping on a talk about volcanoes in Hawaii, Allo, Bronto Thunder, and Dimetro are captured by the Tyrannos, who are using a weather-controlling cannon. The Secret Scouts and Bonehead are likewise defeated, leaving it up to Stego to stop the Tyrannos.
| 32 | "Monday Night Clawball" | Michael E. Uslan, J. Vornholt, S. Robertson | October 27, 1987 |
The Dinosaucers and Tyrannos settle a dispute over a crater full of reptilite with a football game.
| 33 | "Age of Aquariums" | Michael E. Uslan, Cherie Wilkerson | October 28, 1987 |
Plesio frees the fish in the aquarium where the Secret Scouts work and tries to get them to revolt against humanity.
| 34 | "Scents of Wonder" | Somtow Sucharitkul | October 29, 1987 |
The Tyrannos believe that they have a mind-control weapon made from perfume.
| 35 | "Fine-Feathered Friend" | Felicia Maliani | October 30, 1987 |
Teryx comes down with a mysterious illness, and Allo goes to get the Dinosorceress to cure her, but Teryx is kidnapped by a greedy birdwatcher who plans to make her the find of the century.
| 36 | "Allo and Cos-Stego Meet the Abominable Snowman" | Michael E. Uslan, Brooks Wachtel | November 2, 1987 |
Genghis Rex tricks Stego into taking Allo on a search for the Abominable Snowman so that he can steal it and add it to the Tyrannos.
| 37 | "The Quack-Up of Quackpot" | Michael E. Uslan | November 3, 1987 |
It is April Fool's Day, and Quackpot is running wild with practical jokes. It is up to the Secret Scouts to stop him.
| 38 | "It's an Archaeopteryx — It's a Plane — It's Thunder-Lizard" | Michael E. Uslan, Arthur Byron Cover | November 4, 1987 |
When Bronto Thunder lies to his girlfriend Apatty Saurus about his accomplishments on Earth, he is forced to become the superhero Thunder-Lizard. In one part of the episode, Bronto Thunder wears his swimming trunk shorts as he rides through a river.
| 39 | "Teacher's Pest" | Doug Molitor | November 5, 1987 |
When told to stay behind at Lavadome, Bonehead sneaks out to go to school with Ryan and Sara. Meanwhile, Genghis Rex plans to kidnap Bonehead and use him as leverage against Allo.
| 40 | "Dino-Chips!" | Somtow Sucharitkul | November 6, 1987 |
The Tyrannos sabotage a computer company with computer chips from Reptilon.
| 41 | "The Heart and Sole of Bigfoot" | Michael E. Uslan, David Bischoff, Ted Pedersen | November 9, 1987 |
While scouting in Canada, Quackpot turns a lumberjack into a Bigfoot-like creature. The Dinosaucers try to help him while the Tyrannos try to capture him.
| 42 | "Karatesaurus Wrecks" | Michael E. Uslan, David Wise | November 10, 1987 |
The Dinosaucers go to Japan and are roped into working in a monster movie. Meanwhile, the Tyrannos learn karate to fight the Dinosaucers.
| 43 | "Lochs and Bay Gulls" | Michael E. Uslan | November 11, 1987 |
Genghis Rex plans to recruit the Loch Ness Monster into the Tyrannos, but Plesio falls in love with her.
| 44 | "The Trojan Horseasaurus" | Ellen Guon | November 12, 1987 |
When he is kicked out of the Tyrannos, Quackpot plans to get revenge by pretending to be the Ancients of Reptilon.
| 45 | "We're Off to See the Lizard" | Michael E. Uslan, Felicia Maliani | November 13, 1987 |
Sara is hit by a tornado from a Tyranno weather machine and wakes up to find herself in a very Oz-like situation.
| 46 | "Seeing Purple" | Susan Ellison | November 16, 1987 |
The Dinosaucers come down with an illness, and the Secret Scouts have to keep the Tyrannos from finding out.
| 47 | "There's No Such Thing as Stego-Claws" | Michael E. Uslan | November 17, 1987 |
The Dinosaucers plan to go home for Merry Dinosaur Day, but the Tyrannos spoil Bonehead's good cheer by telling him Stego-Claws does not exist. That night, Bonehead and David join Stego-Claws in trying to keep the Tyrannos from ruining Merry Dinosaur Day.
| 48 | "Applesaucers" | Michael E. Uslan | November 18, 1987 |
David, Allo, and Dimetro work to save David's grandparents' farm from the Tyrannos.
| 49 | "Reduced for Clarence" | Michael E. Uslan, Carla Conway | November 19, 1987 |
Ryan, Sara, Allo, and Teryx go to the circus where the Tyrannos are trying to kidnap a stilt-wearing clown named Clarence, whom they believe has a shrink ray.
| 50 | "Attack of the Fur Balls" | Clancy Fort | November 20, 1987 |
After causing trouble at Lavadome, Ugh and Grunt run away, fall into a Tyranno trap, and are taken to the Tar Pits.
| 51 | "Dinosaur Dundy" | Michael E. Uslan | November 23, 1987 |
Bronto Thunder, Tricero, Sara, and David go to Florida to find some dinosaur eggs in the possession of archeologist Dinosaur Dundy, but they have been stolen by a mutated crocodile.
| 52 | "Those Reptilon Nights" | Bill Fawcett | November 24, 1987 |
The Maltese Pterodactyl is stolen, and Tricero is called back to Reptilon to find it.
| 53 | "The Dinolympics" | Bill Fawcett | November 25, 1987 |
Allo tries to get the Tyrannos to compete in their form of Olympics as a way of making peace, while Sara deals with a stuck-up rival at her own Olympics.
| 54 | "Sara Had a Little Lambeosaurus" | Cherie Wilkerson | November 26, 1987 |
Dimetro follows Sara to school and befriends her trouble-making chemistry lab partner, Glen.
| 55 | "Beauty and the Bonehead" | Brynne Stephens | November 27, 1987 |
Genghis Rex steals a perfume from the scientist who made it in order to make himself beautiful and take over the world. The Dinosaucers rush to stop him while Bonehead falls in love with the scientist's daughter.
| 56 | "The Museum of Natural Humans" | Michael E. Uslan, Felicia Maliani, Lydia C. Marano | November 30, 1987 |
The Secret Scouts are abducted by the Tyrannos, who sell them to a museum, and it is up to Allo to rescue them.
| 57 | "Saber-Tooth or Consequences" | Michael E. Uslan, Craig Miller, Mark Nelson | December 1, 1987 |
Sabertooth tiger pirates come to Earth, and the Dinosaucers and Tyrannos team up to stop them.
| 58 | "Camp Tyranno" | Michael E. Uslan, Beth Bornstein | December 2, 1987 |
When the Secret Scouts are away at summer camp, the Tyrannos think they are at a boot camp to prepare them for war. Genghis Rex forms his own boot camp to combat them.
| 59 | "The Babysitter" | Gerry Conway | December 3, 1987 |
In order to go to the Reptile Fair on Reptilon, Bonehead leaves his little brother Numbskull in the care of Quackpot.
| 60 | "Toy-Ranno Store Wars" | Michael E. Uslan, Jody Lynn Nye | December 4, 1987 |
The Tyrannos mistake toy commercials as advertisements for weapons and kidnap David to make him tell them how they work.
| 61 | "The T-Bones' Stakes" | Michael E. Uslan | December 7, 1987 |
The Tyrannos obtain a ray gun that brings dinosaur skeletons to life, and the Dinosaucers seem unable to defeat them.
| 62 | "The Scales of Justice" | Michael E. Uslan | December 8, 1987 |
Sick and tired of always losing to them, the Tyrannos decide to face the Dinosaucers in court.
| 63 | "I Got Those 'Ol Reptilon Blues Again, Mommasaur" | Michael E. Uslan, Todd Johnson | December 9, 1987 |
The Tyrannos go back to Reptilon to return to their old jobs, and Allo, Teryx, and Bronto Thunder follow them to see if they really are.
| 64 | "I Was a Teenage Human" | Lydia C. Marano, David Wise | December 10, 1987 |
The Tyrannos need a new energy source and believe that Paul's science fair project is what they are looking for. They turn Styraco into a human to steal it.
| 65 | "The Friend" | Bill Fawcett | December 11, 1987 |
While on his way for groceries, Stego befriends a lonely boy named Peter. When Stego takes him to Reptilon, the Tyrannos think Peter's toys are prototypes for spaceships and kidnap him.

== Development ==
According to Uslan during a 2019 interview with Syfy, the show was inspired by his son, David, who has an interest in dinosaurs and outer space. He then started to brainstorm his ideas of Tyrannos and the Dinosaucers with his son listening to him explain it. The Secret Scouts were named after members of his family, including his own son.

Uslan worked on a deal with Andy Heyward at DIC Entertainment to air the show through syndication with Coca-Cola Telecommunications.

== Media ==
=== Home video releases ===
==== U.S. releases ====
- Dinosaucers: Dinosaur Valley & Carnivore in Rio: Released in 1994, it included the first and seventeenth episodes of the series.
- Dinosaucers: Take Us Out to the Ball Game & Monday Night Clawball: Released in 1994, it included the second and thirty-second episodes of the series.
- Dinosaucers: Hooray for Hollywood & Divide and Conquer: Released in 1994, it included the fourth and fifth episodes of the series.
- Dinosaucers: The First Snow & Frozen Furballs: Released in 1994, it included the twelfth and eighteenth episodes of the series.

There have been four tapes in total released on VHS cassette in NTSC format specifically for the United States and Canadian markets. None are still in print or available, making these four VHS tapes rare. Dinosaucers has not been released on DVD, and there are no known plans to do so from Sony Pictures Home Entertainment.

==== UK releases ====
- Dinosaucers: Volume 1: Released on March 14, 1994, the episodes included in this volume are Dinosaur Valley, Take Us Out To The Ball Game, Happy Egg Day To You, Hooray For Hollywood and Divide And Conquer.
- Dinosaucers: Volume 2: Released on October 10, 1994, the episodes included in this volume are Burgers Up!, Be Prepared, That Shrinking Feeling, Rockin' Reptiles and Sleeping Booty.

There were two tapes in total released for the UK market in PAL format. Unlike the United States tapes that had two episodes on each tape, the United Kingdom tapes had five episodes each on both tapes released.

The first 21 episodes were previously purchased and downloaded online on Amazon.com as well as on iTunes until the summer of 2013, with no current plans to return as of 2026.

=== Toys ===
There were originally plans by Galoob to release a Dinosaucers toy line, and prototype figures were produced. The toy line was to include the characters Stego, Bronto-Thunder, Allo, Bonehead, Plesio, Quackpot, Ankylo, and Genghis Rex. The line was scrapped when the show was canceled after airing its initial 65 episodes. As a result, some markets began pulling the series from their cartoon line-ups instead of re-running the show's episodes for the remainder of the full 1987-1988 television season.

In 1989, after Dinosaucers premiered in Brazil, a company named Glasslite contacted Galoob and purchased the molds. As such, Glasslite produced five of the eight unproduced Galoob molds of the 8" figures, although they can be extremely hard to find.

=== Comic book series ===
In 2018, Uslan joined with publisher Lion Forge Comics to revive Dinosaucers as a comic book, but the 5-part miniseries was left on a cliffhanger when the comic book was discontinued after a trade paperback was published in January 2019.

== See also ==
- Extreme Dinosaurs
- Dino Riders
- Planet of Dinosaurs
- Terra Nova
