= Mighty Ducks: The Animated Series =

American animated television series

- Genre: Animated series; Action/Adventure; Science fantasy; Superhero; Comedy-drama; Sports
- Created by: Marty Isenberg; Robert N. Skir; David Wise
- Based on: The Mighty Ducks by Steven Brill
- Developed by: Marty Isenberg; Robert N. Skir; David Wise; Gordon Kent
- Voices of: Ian Ziering; James Belushi; Jeff Bennett; Clancy Brown; Tim Curry; Dennis Franz; Brad Garrett; Jennifer Hale; Tony Jay; Steve Mackall; Frank Welker; April Winchell
- Theme music composer: Patrick DeRemer
- Opening theme: "Ducks Rock" performed by Mickey Thomas
- Ending theme: "Ducks Rock" Instrumental
- Composer: Carl Swander Johnson
- Country of origin: United States
- Original language: English
- No. of seasons: 1
- No. of episodes: 26

Production
- Producers: Blair Peters; Frank Squillace
- Cinematography: Lesley Hutchison
- Editor: Jamie Thomason
- Running time: 22 minutes
- Production companies: Walt Disney Television; Walt Disney Television Animation (Note: Animation outsourced to Animal-Ya, Koko Enterprises, Plus One Animation, Sunwoo Animation and Wang Film Productions with pre-production by Studio B Productions.)

Original release
- Network: ABC; Syndication
- Release: September 6, 1996 – January 17, 1997

Mighty Ducks (also known as Mighty Ducks: The Animated Series) is an American animated television series that aired on ABC and the syndicated programming block The Disney Afternoon, the last show produced by the block, in the fall of 1996. The show was loosely inspired by the live-action Mighty Ducks films and the eponymous National Hockey League team, the Mighty Ducks of Anaheim. Unlike the films and the hockey teams, the show was about a team of anthropomorphic hockey-playing ducks.

Twenty-six episodes were produced in total.

The series' main theme, composed by Patrick DeRemer, is performed by Starship vocalist Mickey Thomas.

== Story ==
In another universe exists a planet populated entirely by humanoid ducks. Dubbed "Puckworld" by its inhabitants, it is an icy planet, perfectly suited to the Ducks' favorite pastime, hockey. For the citizens of Puckworld, hockey was not simply a sport, but a way of life, occupying virtually every aspect of day-to-day existence.

Legend has it that centuries ago, during an invasion by a reptilian race called Saurians, a duck named Drake DuCaine became the planet's savior over the Saurians' Overlords. The legend tells that DuCaine did so with a high-tech goalie mask which gave him the ability to see through the Saurians' cloaking technology which was a game changer for him and his people. With it, DuCaine sent the Saurians to a mysterious "Dimensional Limbo".

The last of the Saurians escape from the Dimensional Limbo and return to Puckworld with an armada of robotic attack ships. The group of four is led by the last of the Saurian Overlords, Lord Dragaunus, who is assisted by his minions Siege, Chameleon and Wraith. They invade the planet and enslave the people of Puckworld. After some time, a resistance is formed by Canard Thunderbeak, who has found The Mask of Drake DuCaine. With it, the wearer of the Mask could see through the Saurians' invisibility cloaks. Canard forms a band of Ducks to fight Dragaunus. The members of his team consists of Wildwing Flashblade, Nosedive Flashblade, Tanya Vanderflock, Duke L'Orange, Mallory McMallard and Grin Hardwing. They go on a mission to destroy Dragaunus's fortress the Master Tower and free the planet from the Saurians' control. While the mission is successful, Dragaunus and his forces manage to escape in their ship, the Raptor. The Saurians open up a dimensional gateway to escape through, but Canard and the others follow him into the portal with the Aerowing, intent on stopping them.

Dragaunus attempts to get rid of the Ducks inside the portal by attacking them with an electromagnetic worm that will grow until it can swallow the Aerowing. In a desperate attempt to get rid of the worm, Canard sacrifices his own life by throwing himself to the worm. Before doing so, however, Canard gave the Mask, and leadership of the team, to Wildwing Flashblade, his best friend. Both the Raptor and the Aerowing leave the portal and enter a different dimension, landing in the Earth city of Anaheim, California. The Ducks meet Phil Palmfeather, a human who becomes their manager and makes them a legitimate NHL team. Their arena, only known as The Pond in the show, has a hockey rink that doubles as a landing pad for the Aerowing above and has a formal HQ below. On Earth, the Ducks and Dragaunus continue their fight, with Dragaunus's plans of conquest often curtailed by damage to the Raptor's power source and his efforts to find a new source of power, although there are other villains that also challenge the six Ducks.

== Characters ==
=== Main ===
The Mighty Ducks in action, from left: Nosedive, Tanya, Grin, Wildwing (center), Mallory, Duke.

- Wildwing Flashblade (voiced by Ian Ziering) – Saved by Canard back on Puckworld, he is the leader of the Ducks on and off the ice. At first reluctant to take charge after Canard fell, he eventually comes to accept the role of leadership. As a hockey player, he is the team's goaltender, wearing jersey number 00, and is known for his ability to take any kind of beating and remain standing. Brave like Canard before him, Wildwing is also intelligent and just. He usually plays the straight man to the other ducks and protector to his younger brother, Nosedive. Along with the mask of Drake DuCaine, Wildwing uses body armor and a Puck Launcher on his left gauntlet. The character is based on Wild Wing, the mascot of the Anaheim Ducks since their debut in 1993.
- Nosedive Flashblade (voiced by Steve Mackall) is Wildwing's younger brother, who initially was not intended to be part of Canard's resistance. However, Wildwing makes Canard take Nosedive with them, stating "If you want me, then my brother's part of the deal." Once they reach Earth, Nosedive becomes an official member of the team, both on the hockey team and the crime-fighting team. He is by far the team's most impulsive and immature member. Nosedive is more childish and easygoing than the other Ducks and often looks toward his older brother for support and protection. He usually uses a Puck Blaster and rides a Duckcycle. On-ice, Nosedive is the left winger, and his jersey number is 33.
- Duke L'Orange (voiced by Jeff Bennett) is a notorious jewel thief who was the leader of a gang called the Brotherhood of the Blade, but reformed after joining the resistance against Lord Dragaunus. Duke has used a Puck Blaster in some episodes, but he mainly uses a golden sword called a Ducksaber (or sometimes just a 'saber'). He also carries lock picks and a grappling hook attached to his wrist. Duke is pretty level-headed, albeit egotistical at times. He also has an eyepatch and a chipped beak, possibly as a result of his past as a thief. Duke is the team's center, and his jersey number is 13.
- Mallory McMallard (voiced by Jennifer Hale) is a fiery redhead who is well-learned in Puckworld's version of martial arts, although most of the time she is content with just using a Puck Blaster. She has a sharp tongue and usually directs it towards Nosedive's immature acts, or anything that she feels is out of line. A former member of the Puckworld Special Forces, Mallory is a strict disciplinarian and has a high regard for the chain of command. Mallory is the team's right winger, and her jersey number is 15.
- Tanya Vanderflock (voiced by April Winchell) is the Ducks' resident genius who is often the one turned to for advice, even by Wildwing. She is good with mechanics and uses the Omnitool on her wrist with many of her projects. Despite her intellect, she has bad allergies, lacks confidence, has a gentler personality, and is not as good a fighter as the other ducks. On-ice, Tanya is the left defenseman, and her jersey number is 23.
- Check "Grin" Hardwing (voiced by Brad Garrett as an adult, and J.D. Daniels as a child), is a large super-strong member of the group with a Zen-like philosophy. He rarely uses weapons in battle, relying on his wisdom and strength instead. During Grin's younger years, he had a horrible temper, but found enlightenment with the training from the grand hockey master, Tai Quack Do. Grin is the right defenseman of the team, and his jersey number is 1.

=== Allies ===
- Canard Thunderbeak (voiced by Townsend Coleman) was Wildwing's best friend and the only remaining survivor of the Resistance from Puckworld. He was the original leader and team captain of the Mighty Ducks. While following Dragaunus through a dimensional gateway, Canard sacrificed himself when the Saurians released an electromagnetic worm on the Aerowing, causing him to be trapped in dimensional limbo.
- Phil Palmfeather (voiced by Jim Belushi) is the Ducks' manager. Phil would rather have the team do dangerous or stupid promotional gimmicks and autograph signings with fans than have them save the world over hero work sometimes, although he does acknowledge that they do good. He also has bad taste in fashion.
- Captain Klegghorn (voiced by Dennis Franz) – Head commissioner and captain of the Anaheim Police Department who initially does not trust the Ducks, particularly due to the lack of evidence that Dragaunus even existed in the first place. While he still doesn't like them, eventually they come to terms when he helps Wildwing retake the Pond.
- Thrash (voiced by Jeff Bennett) and Mookie (voiced by April Winchell) are Nosedive's seemingly only human friends who dress like punk rockers. They run a comics store called "Captain Comics," of which Nosedive is a frequent customer.
- Bernie "Buzz" Blitzman (voiced by Jeff Bennett) is a young orphan and boy genius in his early teens. He is a big fan of the Ducks and is particularly fond of Mallory. He proves to be a big help to the Ducks.
- Dr. Huggerman (voiced by Efrem Zimbalist Jr.) is a scientist and friend of Tanya's. He turned his back on humanity when they abused his inventions.
- Borg (voiced by Rob Paulsen) – Borg is the prince regent of an alternate dimension version of Anaheim. The Ducks help him take back his throne and fought against the evil wizard Asteroth.
- B.R.A.W.N. (voiced by Frank Welker) is a robotic bounty hunter who was sent to capture Dragaunus and return him to his Dimensional Limbo prison cell but was reprogrammed to eliminate the Ducks. Tanya was able to re-reprogram him into joining their cause and stopping Dragaunus' assault platform. His name is short for Bounty Robotic Assault and Weapons Negotiator.
- Baby (vocals by Frank Welker) is a young alien who was adopted by Nosedive.
- Prince V’Lara (voiced by Jeff Bennett) is a former Atlantean prisoner turned ally of Wildwing years before the series.
- Stanley Strazinski (voiced by Jim Cummings) is a former hockey player with a violent attitude. Dragaunus came to him for help and used a DNA accelerator to transform him into a monstrous version of himself to fight the ducks. Stanley changed his ways when Grin's words reached him. He was turned back to normal and became a referee.

=== Villains ===
- The Saurians are a race of reptilian humanoids and the primary antagonists.
  - Lord Dragaunus (voiced by Tim Curry) is the dragon-like leader of the Saurians and the last of the Saurian Overlords. Dragaunus is not above working with humans or even other aliens he hates in his quest for world domination. Most of Dragaunus's schemes involve trying to create an alternative fuel source for his flagship, the Raptor, after Grin and Tanya destroyed its power crystals. The Raptor's remaining power is only enough to run the ship's cloaking device.
  - Wraith (voiced by Tony Jay) is a dragon-like sorcerer with a dry sense of humor. He is smarter than Siege or Chameleon and serves as Dragaunus' second-in-command, but disdained by Dragaunus because of his firm belief that the dark magic of their ancestors is the only means for victory. Wraith shuns weapons in battle, preferring to use his ability to throw fireballs. He is very glum and is often predicting the inevitable failure of their mission.
  - Siege (voiced by Clancy Brown) is an Ankylosaurus-like soldier who is aggressive and has a strong hatred for the Ducks. He is mechanically and technologically minded, and he believes that brute force is the only means of victory. He often builds weapons and vehicles and directly uses them against the Ducks.
  - Chameleon (voiced by Frank Welker) is a chameleon-like Saurian with shapeshifting abilities. Much of the time, an imperfect transformation can give him away. At times, he is capable of transforming into a large reptilian form rivaling Siege or Grin in strength. Dragaunus has little patience for his antics and stupidity.
  - The Hunter Drones are robotic foot soldiers of Dragaunus. They have blasters on their hands. They are often easily destroyed by the Ducks. Dragaunus himself destroys them whenever he is extremely angry.
    - Tiny – In "The Iced Ducks Cometh", the Ducks face off against a much larger Drone, nicknamed Tiny by Siege. Nosedive destroys Tiny by crushing him with a Zamboni.
- Dr. Droid (voiced by Charlie Adler) – Formerly a human named Otto Maton, Dr. Droid is now a cyborg and wants to turn the rest of the world into robots.
  - Trina (voiced by Tress MacNeille) is a machine disguised as a typical woman who serves Droid as his right-hand woman.
  - Trina II (voiced by Tress MacNeille) is a duplicate of Trina.
  - J76412 (voiced by Jim Cummings) is a computer system that helps Dr. Droid take control of all the machines in Anaheim.
  - The Devastator Robots are an army of robots created by Dr. Droid.
- Asteroth (voiced by W. Morgan Sheppard) is an evil wizard from another dimension which is a supernatural version of Anaheim, California. His title is "Lord of the Red Dragon", in part due to his ability to transform into a dragon.
  - Balthar (voiced by John Kassir) is a homunculus who is Asteroth's right-hand minion.
  - The Undead Warriors are Asteroth's army of skeletons.
  - The Golems are clay creatures created by Asteroth.
- Phineas P. Viper (voiced by Xander Berkeley) is an industrialist who helped Dragaunus with his plan to create a Super Raptor. In the future, Viper rules Earth with an iron fist and genetically augmented himself with material from his pet snakes.
  - Boopsie is Viper's giant snake pet.
- Daddy-O Cool (voiced by Jim Cummings) is a beat poet who was deformed by toxic waste and is into monster trucks. In "Monster Rally", he challenged the ducks to a monster truck battle and planned to put toxic waste into the world's water supply to make the world a "cooler" place.
  - Digger (voiced by Charlie Adler) is one of Daddy-O Cool's minions.
  - Dragster (voiced by Jeff Bennett) is one of Daddy-O Cool's minions.
- Dr. Wallace "Wally" Pretorious (voiced by Matt Frewer) is a mad scientist who likes to splice different types of DNA on test subjects.
  - The Chicken Monster is a spliced creature created by Dr. Wally Pretorious.
- Falcone (voiced by Reed Diamond) is a Raptrin member of the Brotherhood of the Blade.
- Lucretia DeCoy (voiced by Kath Soucie) is a traitor to the race of the Ducks and a spy for the Saurians. Tanya was the only one who knew who she was, but Lucretia prevented her from revealing that she was a spy by tying her to the top rafters of the Pond.
- Dr. Swindle (voiced by Rob Paulsen) is a corrupt scientist the Saurians hired in "Beaks vs. B.R.A.W.N." to create a flotation device. When the Saurians refuse to pay him for his work, he attempts to sell the machine to the highest bidder instead. The highest bidder turns out to be Chameleon, who took the device and left Swindle with a suitcase full of newspapers.
- Baron Von Licktenstamp (voiced by David Hyde Pierce) is a German hunter who owns his own island. He captures Wildwing, Tanya and Duke and hunts them. Licktenstamp was captured by the three ducks and stuck to a wall.
- Mondo-Man (voiced by Eddie Deezen & Jeff Bennett) – Alvin Yasbeck is a regular customer of Captain Comics who did not like the Ducks' style of crimefighting, so he acted like he was his own superhero. Tricking him into believing the Saurians were good and the Ducks were evil, Dragaunus gives Yasbeck super powers and gets him to do his dirty work. After Dragaunus is finished with him, he takes away Yasbeck's powers.
- Emperor Charg (voiced by Jim Cummings) is an unscrupulous alien ruler who oversees Space Hockey, a tournament where those who lose or fail to participate are disintegrated.
  - Weasel (voiced by Frank Welker) is Emperor Charg's minion.
- Emperor Xyloid and Commander Xenon (both voiced by Jim Cummings) are Abominable Snowman-like aliens that came to Earth to freeze the entire planet to live on with the aid of their weather machine, which was interfering with Dragaunus' plan to use solar power to recharge the Raptor.
- Zap (voiced by Frank Welker) is an energy creature created by Dragaunus. It ends ups doing the Ducks a favor as they have it teleported to Dragaunus's ship and wrecks it.
- Minotaur (voiced by Frank Welker) is a huge monster who guards the star sword.
- Lord Gargan (voiced by Jonathan Harris) is an Atlantean who collaborated with Chameleon to take over Atlantis.

== Episodes ==
=== Series overview ===
Season	Episodes	Originally released	
Season	Episodes	First released	Last released
1	26	September 6, 1996	January 17, 1997

No.	Title	Directed by	Written by	Original release date
1	"The First Face Off: Part One"	Doug Murphy and Blair Peters	David Wise	September 6, 1996
Curious about a team of giant ducks playing hockey, police captain Klegghorn talks to their manager, Phil Palmfeather, who reveals that they are a resistance group against the evil Saurian overlords on the other-dimensional planet Puckworld. Notes: The first team the Ducks compete against are from Maine. Paul Kariya, the first player ever drafted by the real-world Mighty Ducks of Anaheim, was a star player for the University of Maine ice hockey team.
2	"The First Face Off: Part Two"	Doug Murphy	David Wise	September 6, 1996
As the Ducks arrive on Earth, leaving Canard trapped in limbo, they attempt to find a place in their new world as Wildwing struggles with the decision of whether or not to fully accept his new role as leader.
3	"A Traitor Among Us"	Doug Murphy	Gordon Kent	September 13, 1996
An attractive spy is hired by Dragaunus to trick the Ducks into acquiring a chip in a mountain, leaving Nosedive and Duke smitten and with only Tanya aware of her true identity.
4	"Zap Attack"	Syunji Oga and Kou Qing Chang	David Wise	September 14, 1996
When Dragaunus creates an energy creature that unleashes havoc on the city, only Tanya's friend Doctor Huggarman can help them save the day.
5	"Phil in the Blank"	Doug Murphy	Len Uhley	September 21, 1996
Needing to keep the Ducks occupied while he steals an engine from a rocket, Dragaunus has Wraith cast a spell on Phil to keep the Ducks busy with various public appearances, and only an unconscious Nosedive knows the truth.
6	"Power Play"	Doug Murphy	Marty Isenberg, Robert N. Skir & David Wise	September 28, 1996
A hockey goon with a grudge against the Ducks reminds Grin of himself before he met his mentor, but when Dragaunus transforms the goon into a monster – while also creating an electricity-based monster – Grin must recall his master's lessons before all the Ducks are slaughtered.
7	"Dungeons and Ducks"	Doug Murphy	David Wise	October 4, 1996
When all the Ducks – minus Grin – are sent to a dimension where magic rules, they must help their new friend Borg defeat the evil wizard Asteroth and get home in time for their next hockey game. Notes: The episode is a spoof of the game Dungeons & Dragons. Also, parodies of Elfquest characters Cutter and Skywise appear.
8	"Take Me to Your Leader"	Shunji Oga and Nobukazu Sakuma	David Wise	October 11, 1996
After making a mistake in a fight against the Saurians, Wildwing resigns from his role as leader, leaving the other Ducks each attempting to assume command as Dragaunus unleashes a powerful alien plant against the city.
9	"The Human Factor"	Blair Peters	David Wise	October 12, 1996
With the Mask broken in a recent confrontation, Wildwing, Nosedive, Mallory and Duke must resort to more conventional detective work when they find themselves trapped in a suspiciously nice town after the Migrator mysteriously breaks down.
10	"Beak to the Future"	Doug Murphy	David Wise	October 18, 1996
When faced with an offer by Dragaunus to return home, the Ducks are confronted by a future version of Phil who takes them to a future where Dragaunus has conquered Earth, forcing the Ducks to defeat Phineas Viper – Earth's ruler in Dragaunus's absence – before they return home to stop Dragaunus's original plan from succeeding. Notes: The title of this episode is a spoof of Back to the Future. Tanya's method for taking down Project X is similar to how Luke Skywalker blows up the Death Star in Star Wars Episode IV: A New Hope. This episode was not aired long in syndication for unknown reasons.
11	"Microducks"	Doug Murphy & Blair Peters	David Wise	October 19, 1996
While investigating a crime spree by the evil Doctor Droid, Nosedive, Tanya and Grin are hit by a shrinking ray, leaving them rapidly shrinking as the others attempt to defeat Droid's powerful robot.
12	"Beaks vs. B.R.A.W.N."	Doug Murphy	David Ehrman	October 26, 1996
When Dragaunus reprograms a B.R.A.W.N. robot – one of the guards who oversaw his dimensional prison – to attack the Ducks, Wildwing, Mallory and Tanya must re-reprogram B.R.A.W.N. to help them stop Dragaunus from acquiring a flotation device he needs to power his new aerial fortress.
13	"Jurassic Puck"	Doug Murphy	Judith and Garfield Reeves-Stevens	November 2, 1996
Attempting to turn Earth into a Saurian paradise, Dragaunus unleashes a wave of dinosaurs against the Ducks. Note: The title of this episode is a spoof of Jurassic Park.
14	"The Return of Dr. Droid"	Blair Peters	David Wise	November 8, 1996
Doctor Droid has returned with a new robot body and a computer that will allow him to control every electronic appliance in the world. Meanwhile, Phil gets a new girlfriend... or does he?
15	"Mondo-Man"	Blair Peters	David Wise	November 9, 1996
When a new superhero appears in town and starts to treat the Ducks like the villains, the Ducks realise that he has been deceived by Dragaunus, leaving them in a race against time to stop him before innocent people are endangered. Notes: Mondo-Man is very similar to Superman, possessing identical powers, paraphrasing the line "Truth, Justice and the American Way", and using a glowing green rock he created, which he referred to as "Ducktonite", designed to take Wildwing, Tanya and Grin's strength away, similar to Superman's reaction to Kryptonite.
16	"Puck Fiction"	Doug Murphy	David Wise	November 15, 1996
With the other Ducks arrested for a crime they didn't commit, Mallory, Nosedive and Grin must pose as spies to find out what is going on. Note: This episode is a parody of Pulp Fiction.
17	"Monster Rally"	Fumio Maezono & Shunji Oga	Judith and Garfield Reeves-Stevens	November 16, 1996
The mutated Daddy-O Cool is determined to make the world a "cooler" place by contaminating the world's water supply, but he requires the engine from the new Mega-Migrator for his plan to be successful.
18	"Buzz Blitzman, Mighty Duck!"	Blair Peters	David Wise	November 22, 1996
The Ducks are forced to protect an annoying fan of theirs from Dragaunus, but the attempt is hampered due to the kid refusing to reveal why Dragaunus wants him in the first place.
19	"Bringing Down Baby"	Blair Peters	David Ehrman	November 23, 1996
When the Ducks discover an alien egg from space, the egg hatches to reveal an alien that imprints on Nosedive as its father, the Ducks little suspecting that Dragaunus arranged for them to find the egg in the first place. Note: The title of the episode is a parody of the 1938 comedy film Bringing Up Baby.
20	"Mad Quacks Beyond Hockeydome"	Blair Peters	David Wise	December 6, 1996
While Dragaunus makes a new batch of Balerium Crystals to power his engines, the Ducks are sent to another planet to play a game of Space Hockey where the losers are disintegrated. Note: The episode is a parody of Mad Max Beyond Thunderdome.
21	"The Final Face Off"	Doug Murphy	David Wise	December 7, 1996
Wildwing is captured by Dragaunus, who wants to use the Mask to locate Atlantis, which has a plentiful supply of Balerium Crystals, to create a portal into dimensional limbo. Note: Chronologically, this is the last episode.
22	"The Iced Ducks Cometh"	Shunji Oga & Fumio Maezono	David Ehrman	December 13, 1996
The Ducks find themselves fighting a two-sided war as Dragaunus attempts to heat Earth up at the same time as two aliens try to freeze the planet.
23	"The Most Dangerous Duck Hunt"	Troy Adomitis	David Ehrman	December 20, 1996
Tracking Dragaunus's recent creation of a Solaranite missile to the only place where the mineral is found on Earth, Wildwing, Tanya and Duke find themselves the prey in a big game hunt and restricted to only the basic essentials of their weaponry. Notes: The episode is a parody of "The Most Dangerous Game". Villain Baron Von Licktenstamp is called "Colonel Klunk" by Duke – a joking reference to Colonel Klink of Hogan's Heroes.
24	"The Return of Asteroth"	Shunji Oga & Fumio Maezono	David Wise	December 27, 1996
When the sorcerer Asteroth comes to Earth to search for his amulet – which the Ducks took from him as a souvenir of their last encounter – the Ducks must destroy the amulet before Asteroth kills them all.
25	"Duck Hard"	Unknown	Judith and Garfield Reeves-Stevens	January 3, 1997
When Dragaunus mounts a direct attack on the Ducks' headquarters, Wildwing is forced to team up with the Ducks' old "nemesis" Captain Klegghorn to get through the base's security systems. They win the championship but barely. Note: The episode is a parody of Die Hard.
26	"To Catch a Duck"	Doug Murphy	David Ehrman	January 17, 1997
When Dragaunus sends notorious Puckworld thief Falcone after the jewels he requires for his latest weapon, tensions arise among the Ducks as Mallory questions Duke's loyalty, due to Falcone once having been a part of his gang.

== Home media ==
A direct-to-video feature film titled Mighty Ducks the Movie: The First Face-Off was released on VHS on April 8, 1997. It comprises three episodes of the series ("The First Face Off" Parts 1 and 2, and "Duck Hard") edited into one continuous movie. The director of this movie is credited under the pseudonym Alan Smithee, usually chosen by any director who chooses not to be credited, which has been used in various productions since 1969.

The series has been available on the streaming service Disney+ in the U.S. since its launch in November 2019.

== Awards and nominations ==
- Daytime Emmy Awards

1997 – Outstanding Sound Editing – Special Class – Paca Thomas, Nick Carr, Marc S. Perlman, Kris Daly, Melissa Ellis, Phyllis Ginter, Eric Hertsguaard, Paul Holzborn, Jennifer Mertens, William Griggs, Jeff Hutchins, Kenneth Young, Bill Kean, David Lynch, and Otis Van Osten (won)
