= Go! Comi =

Publishing imprint of Go! Media Entertainment, LLC

Go! Comi was the publishing imprint of the American multimedia company, Go! Media Entertainment, LLC, established to "specializ(e) in publishing Japanese comics for the American market, and in creating new manga and manga-oriented properties for both the Japanese and American markets".

== History ==
Go! Comi was launched in 2005 by writer David Wise and his wife Audry Taylor; the former served as the company's CEO, with the latter as creative director. The company specialized in adapting Japanese manga for the American market, with much of their output the work of mother/daughter team Brynne Chandler and Mallory Reaves. They published such best-selling series as the Eisner-nominated After School Nightmare, Cantarella, Her Majesty's Dog, Tenshi Ja Nai!! and Crossroad.

Although reasonably successful, the Go! Comi imprint was shut down in 2009 after the parent company (also owned by Wise and Taylor) declared bankruptcy due to the failure of its unrelated on-line app "oPlay". The official website stopped being updated in early 2010 and expired in May of that year.

In 2011, the site was allegedly relaunched under new owners with instructions to donate to a PayPal account to revive the publisher. Former Go! Comi creative director Audry Taylor confirmed that the new website was a scam not associated with the defunct imprint.

== Distributed titles ==
- 07-Ghost
- A Wise Man Sleeps
- After School Nightmare
- A.I. Revolution
- Black Sun, Silver Moon
- Bogle
- Bound Beauty
- Cantarella
- Cross x Break
- Crossroad
- Crown
- Cy-Believers
- Her Majesty's Dog
- Hikkatsu! Strike a Blow to Vivify
- Japan Ai: A Tall Girl's Adventures in Japan
- Kamisama Kazoku
- Kanna
- King of the Lamp
- Kurogane Communication
- Love Master A
- Night of the Beasts
- Song of the Hanging Sky
- Tenshi Ja Nai!!
- The Devil Within
- Three in Love
- Train+Train
- Yggdrasil
- Ultimate Venus
