= Crossroad (manga) =

Japanese manga series by Shioko Mizuki

- Cover of Crossroad volume 7 as published by Go! Comi, featuring Kajitsu and Natsu

クロスロード (Kurosurōdo)
- Genre: Romantic comedy
- Manga
- Written by: Shioko Mizuki
- Published by: Akita Shoten
- English publisher: NA: Go! Comi; (expired)
- Imprint: Princess Comics
- Magazine: Princess
- Original run: November 6, 2002 – November 5, 2005
- Volumes: 7

Crossroad (Japanese: クロスロード, Hepburn: Kurosurōdo) is a Japanese manga series written and illustrated by Shioko Mizuki. It was serialized by Akita Shoten in the shōjo manga magazine Princess from 2002 to 2005 and collected in seven bound volumes. It was licensed in North America by Go! Comi before the imprint shut down in 2010. The story follows a teenage girl, Kajitsu, who, after her grandmother dies, ends up living with her two stepbrothers and younger stepsister, all unrelated to each other.

== Synopsis ==
Kajitsu has never known a proper family. Her father is a deadbeat who walked out when she was five, and her mother runs off with would-be husbands repeatedly.

Kajitsu lives with grandmother in a rental house. When the story begins grandmother has just died, and Kajitsu is feeling the loss very badly. Soon her two step-brothers, whom she hasn't seen in seven years, arrive for the funeral, followed by her unreliable mother. Kajitsu once had fond feelings for Natsu, back when they lived together, but something came between them. Now Natsu too is adrift and homeless. Two days later mom has left again, gone with a man in pursuit of her dream of a stable and comfortable married life. She has done this many times in the past. This time she leaves behind six-year-old Satsuki, a sister in some way to the other three kids. The three are thrown together, and onto their own resources. They will try to make a household and a family for themselves.

== Characters ==
Kajitsu Toda
Age 15. The point of view of the story. She has never known a proper family. She faces adversity with anger. Because of her personal issues the other students at her school call her the ice-queen.
Taro Toda
Age 20. Works as a deliveryman. He was living in a very small (4 tatami mats, ~72 sq ft., + unit bath) apartment.
Natsu Toda
Age 15, slightly younger than Kajitsu. He had been a rather chubby geek when he and Kajitsu lived together seven years ago. Now he is a slender handsome young man, who had prospects of going to top-ranked Tokyo University.
Rumiko Toda
Age 28. Kajitsu's irresponsible mother and ex-wife to Taro and Natsu's fathers. She is constantly running off with men, and always making extravagant promises to her children. Now she has run off again, dumping her youngest child on Kajitsu, Taro, and Natsu. Her nickname is "Run-run", (which rhymes with "June").
Satsuki Toda
Age 6. Rumiko's youngest daughter.

== Publication ==
Crossroad was written and illustrated by Shioko Mizuki. It was serialized by Akita Shoten in the shōjo manga magazine Princess from November 6, 2002, to November 5, 2005. The individual chapters were collected in seven bound volumes, which were released by Akita Shoten between June 12, 2003, and December 16, 2005. The manga was licensed in North America by Go! Comi, which released the seven volumes between November 1, 2005, and June 30, 2007. It went out-of-print when Go! Comi shut down in 2010. The manga is also licensed in France by Taifu Comics and in Korea by SamyangM.

=== Volume listing ===
No.	Original release date	Original ISBN	English release date	English ISBN
1	June 12, 2003	4-253-19291-2	November 1, 2005	978-0976895725
2	December 11, 2003	4-253-19292-0	February 1, 2006	978-0976895763
3	May 20, 2004	4-253-19293-9	May 1, 2006	978-1933617008
4	November 4, 2004	4-253-19294-7	August 30, 2006	978-1933617046
5	March 16, 2005	4-253-19295-5	January 30, 2007	978-1933617107
6	August 16, 2005	4-253-19296-3	April 30, 2007	978-1933617114
7	December 16, 2005	4-253-19297-1	June 30, 2007	978-1933617282

== Reception ==
The storyline has been described as "unique" by IGN, and by Mania.com as a storyline of "delicious complications" that does "a fantastic job illustrating the wreckage that is youth". Mania.com's Julie Rosato described herself to have been "engulfed" by the characters and their story since the first volume, and considers the series to have a good balance between comedy and drama. Rosato enjoyed the pacing of the second volume, finding it unusual that Kajitsu's teacher doesn't mind that Kajitsu has a crush on him. The fourth volume includes a story where Taro supports his ailing birth mother, and Rosato says "touching to see their affections take root and hold on so fiercely" despite the tenuous nature of the family's existence. In the sixth volume, Rosato criticises the manga artist for being "too attached to certain characters to let them go properly" as shown in "the return to school after summer vacation". On the fourth volume, Rosato comments that "the narrative wasn't as clear as it could have been, and maybe not all of the characters met their full potential, but there's a lot going on underneath the surface." Manga Life's Brigid Alverson comments on the first volume that "the mood is a bit uneven, alternating between cartoony [chibi] violence and pensive moments, but the story never bogs down." Nicolas Demay of Planete BD comments the manga for its tone "while sometimes moving stay light without giving into the excess of pathos". He also comment that "the author wanted to dedicated herself in her vision of the heroine." Planete BD's Faustine Lillaz review of the second volume commends the manga for its "minimalist" art, saying "the arts are of good quality: the cutting and the directing are well done, the trait is fine & precise and the screentone is abundant. (even if often a bit crude)." Lillaz further commends the manga for the rendering of Kajitsu's feelings, the regular comedy to "alleviate the atmosphere" and the use of fan service. Lillaz's review of the fourth volume criticises the manga for its slow pacing but commends the manga for its "expressive" characters and its "cutting is rather dynamic and the trait is rather precise." Lillaz's review of volume seven commends "the narration [which] is perfectly mastered and thus the story conveys the feelings with sensibility and pudor. Manga News commends the manga for covering hard subjects such as "the age difference, an impossible love between brother and sister and child abandonment" with a light scenario, as well as character development, however it is criticized for a lack of realism and non-detailed background.
