= A.I. Revolution =

Japanese manga series by Yuu Asami

- Cover of the first English-language volume of A.I. Revolution, published by Go! Comi

A・Iレボリューション (A.I. Reboryūshon)
- Genre: Science fiction
- Manga
- Written by: Yuu Asami
- Published by: Akita Shoten
- English publisher: NA: Go! Comi
- Imprint: Princess Comics
- Magazine: Princess
- Original run: 1994 – June 6, 2003
- Volumes: 17

A.I. Revolution (Japanese: A・Iレボリューション, Hepburn: A.I. Reboryūshon) is a Japanese manga series written and illustrated by Yuu Asami. It was serialized in Princess magazine from 1994 to June 2003. The individual chapters were collected and published in 17 tankōbon volumes by Akita Shoten, with the first volume released in July 1995; the last volume was released in October 2003. The series was licensed for an English-language release by Go! Comi and for a Spanish-language release by Mangaline Comics.

== Plot ==
The series focuses on Sui, the daughter of a genius engineer, and Vermillion, a new high tech robot created by her father that looks, talks, and acts like a human teenage boy. Sui is tasked with teaching him what it means to be human, not expecting to find herself falling in love.

== Media ==
=== Volume listing ===
| No. | Original release date | Original ISBN | English release date | English ISBN |
|---|---|---|---|---|
| 1 | July 1995 | 978-4-253-07929-7 | December 13, 2007 | 978-1-933617-64-0 |
| 2 | February, 1996 | 978-4-253-07930-3 | March 3, 2008 | 978-1-933617-65-7 |
| 3 | June, 1996 | 978-4-253-07931-0 | April 14, 2008 | 978-1-933617-72-5 |
| 4 | December, 1996 | 978-4-253-07932-7 | June 6, 2008 | 978-1-933617-73-2 |
| 5 | June, 1997 | 978-4-253-07933-4 | August 15, 2008 | 978-1-933617-79-4 |
| 6 | September, 1997 | 978-4-253-07954-9 | October 15, 2008 | 978-1-933617-80-0 |
| 7 | March, 1998 | 978-4-253-07955-6 | — | — |
| 8 | September, 1998 | 978-4-253-07933-4 | — | — |
| 9 | March, 1999 | 978-4-253-07960-0 | — | — |
| 10 | September, 1999 | 978-4-253-07961-7 | — | — |
| 11 | April, 2000 | 978-4-253-07962-4 | — | — |
| 12 | November, 2000 | 978-4-253-07963-1 | — | — |
| 13 | June, 2001 | 978-4-253-07964-8 | — | — |
| 14 | December, 2001 | 978-4-253-19204-0 | — | — |
| 15 | June 27, 2002 | 978-4-253-19205-7 | — | — |
| 16 | March 27, 2003 | 978-4-253-19206-4 | — | — |
| 17 | October 30, 2003 | 978-4-253-19207-1 | — | — |

== Reception ==
Pop Culture Shock's Katherine Dacey compares the manga's artwork to Keiko Nishi's artwork "with its slightly stylized character designs, delicate linework, and sparing use of screentone". Michelle Smith compares the episodic nature of the manga to Inuyasha, where "most of the nefarious doings can be traced back to the same culprit". Manga Life's Ysabet Reinhardt MacFarlane commends the manga for its "detailed and very easy to follow" artwork. Mania.com's Sakura Eries criticizes the manga for its "not very compelling" protagonists. Later reviews by Sakura Eries criticizes the manga, which was published in 1996, for its "futuristic anachronism" of the story that is set in 2021. Eries comments that the scenarios would seem dated in the post 9/11 world. She also criticized the manga for its unrealistic plot.
