= Bogle (manga) =

Japanese manga

- Cover of the first volume of Bogle as published by Akita Shoten

ボーグル (Bōguru)
- Genre: Action, Mystery
- Manga
- Written by: Yuko Ichiju
- Illustrated by: Shino Taira
- Published by: Akita Shoten
- English publisher: US: Go! Comi
- Magazine: Princess
- Original run: February 6, 2002 – April 5, 2003
- Volumes: 3

Bogle (Japanese: ボーグル, Hepburn: Bōguru) is a manga series written by Yuko Ichiju and illustrated by Shino Taira. The individual chapters were originally serialized in Akita Shoten's Princess magazine between February 6, 2002, and April 5, 2003. It was later published in three tankōbon volumes from August 22, 2002, to July 10, 2003. At the New York Anime Festival, Go! Comi announced the manga series was licensed for an English language release in North America. It was adapted into two drama CDs by King Records; the first was released on February 26, 2003, while the second was published on October 22, 2003.

== Plot ==
=== Volume One ===
There's nothing harder than starting fresh at a new high school...unless it's having to hide your secret identity as a cat-burglar! Asuka is just your average, ordinary girl, except for her midnight vigilante habit of stealing from evil-doers! To her surprise, she finds she's not the only thief in school...but can this lone wolf learn to play well with others?

=== Volume Two ===
Asuka is getting to know her new teammates, and the jobs they've pulled together have all gone well...until they drop a priceless statue into the hands of an innocent bystander! Classmate Hirose has a major crush on Asuka, so it's probably a good thing he doesn't know she's the one who just got him kidnapped!

=== Volume Three ===
Asuka's past catches up to her when her former mentor is framed. Asuka will do anything to prove his innocence... well, at least in this situation! Meanwhile, threats from the ruthless, unstoppable head of a powerful corporation endanger something very precious left to Asuka by her parents - which turns out to be much more important than she could ever have imagined!

== Characters ==
=== Main cast ===
- Asuka Hamuro is a sixteen-year-old girl who, because of her brother's job, has relocated from Okinawa to Yokohama. She attends "Private School Asumori High," where she meets several interesting characters. For several years she has moonlighted as "Cat," a thief who steals objects and gives them back to their rightful owners. Because of this, and because of her previous involvement with high school gymnastics, she is recruited for the "chivalrous thieves" organization Bogle.
- Masato Ogami is a sixteen-year-old guy in Asuka's class. He loves gadgets, learning everything he knew from an old former neighbor, and designs many of the items used during Bogle's missions. He has three older brothers, a doctor Taketo, a 26-year-old lawyer Hideto, and a rock star Kaito.
- Ryoma Munakata is the eighteen-year-old captain of Asumori High's kendo team, his skills earning him the name "the fierce god of Asumori" from competitors. Asuka has also seen him gardening, although is told not to tell anyone for fear of his reputation.

=== Supporting cast ===
- Nobuyuki Hamuro is Asuka's 26-year-old brother who as a member of the Yokohama police is determined to catch the members of Bogle.
- Reijiro Wakaki is the son of Eiichiro the school principal, a professor at Asumori, and a key figure in the Bogle organization.
- Mika Asami is Asuka and Masato's classmate and a member of the newspaper club. She is one of the first people to befriend Asuka, lives in the same apartment complex as her, and has an elder sister who works as a detective in the same unit as Asuka's brother.
- Fuki Konishi is the younger sister of Ryoma's childhood friend and painter Shunji Konishi, and, as of Volume Two, a classmate at Asumori.
- Kiyomaru Wakaki is in the sixth grade, a whiz at hacking computers and the younger brother of Reijiro. He assists Bogle with tracking down electronic records and information.
- Toshinobu Hirose is a sophomore in class A and the so-called "ace striker" on Asumori's soccer team, who develops feelings for Asuka and attempts to ask her out.
