= Tenshi Ja Nai!! =

Japanese manga series by Takako Shigematsu

- North American cover of Tenshi Ja Nai!! volume 1. Left to right: Yasukuni Inukai, Hikaru Takabayashi and Izumi Kido.

天使じゃない!!
- Genre: Comedy, romance
- Manga
- Written by: Takako Shigematsu
- Published by: Akita Shoten
- English publisher: NA: Go! Comi
- Imprint: Princess Comics
- Magazine: Princess
- Original run: February 6, 2003 – May 2, 2006
- Volumes: 8
- icon

Tenshi Ja Nai!! (天使じゃない!!; transl. "I'm No Angel!!") is a Japanese manga series written and illustrated by Takako Shigematsu. It was serialized in Princess magazine from February 2003 to May 2006 and published in eight tankōbon volumes by Akita Shoten. In North America, the manga was published by Go! Comi from October 2005 to September 2007; it went out-of-print when the company shut down in 2010.

== Characters ==
Hikaru Takabayashi
Her parents are being transferred to France and she does not want to go. Her mother agrees to let her stay if she goes to an all-girls boarding high school, her mother's alma mater. Hikaru went wanting a quiet life, having been bullied at her other schools. She is a kind, loyal girl, extremely strong as at one point she carries Izumi Kido away from a mob of fans. She falls in love with her music teacher, Tsukasa Ayase, and at first he rejects her, but then they start going out. Ayase then breaks up with her, and later Hikaru falls in love with Izumi and they get together. Hikaru used to be bullied by her classmates since they believed she was acting stuck up and snobby while she modeled, and although she loved modeling, she eventually quit to avoid the bullying.
Izumi Kido
Apparently a very beautiful girl working as a model/actress, she is actually a boy in secret. When he realizes his secret has been discovered by Hikaru, he very aggressively blackmails her into keeping that secret. They eventually come to a friendlier arrangement. He desperately needs a large sum of money to pay his father's medical bills and is dismayed that he fell into this sort of career that barely enables him to make that kind of money. When blackmail is no longer satisfactory, he makes Hikaru his sub-manager and gofer. He falls in love with Hikaru, and is very irritated at first when Hikaru's with Ayase. To his joy, Ayase and Hikaru break up. After confessing his love for her later in the series, he and Hikaru start dating. Izumi disappears after his secret is revealed. A year later, Hikaru spots him attending her graduation ceremony; he had changed his name and studied architecture. The series concludes with the two kissing in the forest as her classmates come running up.
Yasukuni Inukai
He is Izumi's manager and works at the school as a janitor to protect his secret. He is Izumi's best friend, and, depending on the circumstances, eventually a good friend to Hikaru too. Because the dorms are pet-free, he keeps Hikaru's little dog.
Yuichi Akizuki
He is Izumi's agent. He is quite intent on finding Hikaru bits as an extra, etc., in Izumi's work, despite Hikaru's strong desire to hide in the background.
Tsukasa Ayase
Music teacher at the high school and grandson of the head-mistress. A relationship develops with Hikaru and she falls in love with him. He has similar feelings for her, until events in volumes 5 and 6 tear him away from the school.
Hayata Kurobe
A Kansai manzai (comedy duo) team member. He and Izumi are frequently cast in the same productions. He accidentally saw Izumi coming on to Hikaru, mistakenly thinking that Izumi was a lesbian. Nevertheless, he fell in love with Izumi. Hikaru and Yasukuni have to work hard to exclude Kurobe from Izumi's private life.
Kaoru Habashi
He is Kurobe's friend and the other half of the manzai duo. At first, he was mocked by Hikaru when she said he couldn't live without Kurobe. Later, he fell for her. Just as Kurobe is abusive in trying to make out with Izumi, he is abusive in trying to make out with Hikaru. He and Kurobe finally discovered Izumi's secret.

== Reception ==
Tenshi Ja Nai!! received mixed reviews. In Manga: The Complete Guide, author Jason Thompson described the series as "trashy but enjoyable"; he criticized its "stiff" artwork and "unrealistic" plot twists and characters, but admitted that "the romance is entertaining in an over-the-top way". In contrast, Zac Bertschy of Anime News Network found the artwork to be "surprisingly beautiful", with "clean, very elegant linework", and described the plot as "easy to follow and hard to dislike". However, he acknowledged that the series sometimes "dips into cliché"; he also criticized the romance subplot between Izumi and Yasukuni as "standard fangirl pandering" and complained that, in general, the characters "lack ... strong personalities". Nevertheless, Bertschy felt that Tenshi Ja Nai!! is a "sweet, light-hearted little shoujo comedy that deserves a look from fans of the genre."
