= Black Sun, Silver Moon =

Japanese manga series

- First English volume of Black Sun, Silver Moon as published by Go! Comi

黒の太陽 銀の月 (Kuro no Taiyō Gin no Tsuki)
- Manga
- Written by: Tomo Maeda
- Published by: Shinshokan
- English publisher: NA: Go! Comi
- Magazine: Wings
- Original run: 26 July 2001 – 25 February 2006
- Volumes: 7

Black Sun, Silver Moon (Japanese: 黒の太陽 銀の月, Hepburn: Kuro no Taiyō Gin no Tsuki) is a Japanese manga series written and illustrated by Tomo Maeda. In Japan, she is the creator of several manga series in a variety of different genres.

The series tells the story of a boy named Taki Juhas who has taken the job at the local church as an assistant to the priest, Shikimi, to repay his father's debt. By day, he does mundane chores but at night, Shikimi and Taki venture into graveyards to destroy the freshly risen dead.

It was first seen in Wings magazine in 2001. Since then it has been printed in Japan, China, Taiwan and the United States. To date, there are seven volumes of Black Sun, Silver Moon that have been released.

== Plot ==
=== Volume 1 ===
Taki's family was desperate for money after news reached of his late father's debt with the church. He accepts the position of assistant to Shikimi to pay off debt. Shikimi reveals to Taki that the dead have risen from their graves and have become quite a threat for those still living. Demons have somehow entered the dead. Shikimi has been searching for an assistant in destroying these demons for the past 3 years. He chose Taki because he is strong enough to strike down demons and has no fear when it comes to confronting evil. Shikimi reveals to Taki that one day he will become a demon and he needed someone who would not hesitate in killing him. Later in the series, the reader learns more about Shikimi's past as well as to why he is turning into a demon. He confesses that he doesn't have much time left before he turns into a demon and entrust Taki to kill him when the time comes. Until that time comes, Taki encourages Shikimi to resist the demon inside him. Taki swears to Shikimi "I'll kill you cleanly, without any pain. And then…I'll die right alongside you."
A Silver hair dog appears at the church and refuses to leave Taki alone, this frustrates him because he hates dogs The silver dog continuously bites Taki. They return to the graveyard and Shikimi explains that the resurrected will try to return to the people they love. This brings back memories for Taki of an abandoned puppy that he took care of in the village. After being abandoned for several days the government killed the dog out of fear that it would turn feral and attack the villagers. Taki realizes that the silver dog is actually the resurrected dog that he took care of 10 years ago. Taki is happy to see his beloved dog again and unofficially adopts her, naming her Agi.

=== Volume 2 ===
Tomo Maeda introduces Laz Largo Varga, a demon slayer apprentice sent to kill Shikimi from a neighboring country. She works in an organization within the church dedicated to destroying the resurrected. However, she injures her foot trying to attack Taki and is forced to heal at the church. While staying in Taki's care she reveals to him Shikimi's dark past. Three years ago he murdered his whole village in one night and he refused to prove his innocence in court and so the organization sent Laz to punish Shikimi for his crimes. However, Laz quickly falls for Shikimi proclaiming "I always knew male-companionship was the best thing for me. It's so much better to talk things out with our fists!" Grey-san shows up one night asking for Shikimi. He is a friend of Shikimi, a resurrected demon from the west. According to Shikimi, depending on the region the resurrected are reborn differently. Shikimi is struggling to resist the demon inside him and sends Taki away in order to protect him. Shortly after returning home, Taki realizes that he cannot abandon Shikimi and returns to the church.

=== Volume 3 ===
This volume begins with a flashback between Shikimi and Grey-san. It is at the beginning of Shikimi's demon transformation and Grey-san makes a bet with Shikimi. He Shikimi is able to find a way to regain his humanity, he wins. If not, then Grey-San wins and Shikimi will become a demon. The story goes back to the present where Shikimi is still struggling with his demonic urges. The desire to feed on human blood is becoming stronger and Shikimi is afraid that he will eventually attack Taki and Laz out hunger. One night Shikimi is plagued by terrible nightmares, Taki goes in to check on him and Shikimi almost feeds on him. Shikimi is able to stop himself but is repulsed by his lack of self-control. Shikimi admits to Taki "I'm afraid of myself…because I don't know what I might do." Taki reassures Shikimi that he is still not afraid of him and vows that he will stay by Shikimi and help him overcome his demons. The following night Shikimi meets with Grey-san and declares that he has won their bet. His salvation is Taki he confesses to Grey "If I do end up killing him, he will always believe in me and as long as I am myself, I won't hurt him." Taki has made him a changed man and Shikimi believes that this will revive his soul. The next chapter goes back in time when Shikimi was still a human. He was the priest of a small village. The church acted as an orphanage and it was run by Amaria and Eva. Amaria is fond of Shikimi and eventually he asks her to marry him. She and Shikimi are married soon after. Grey-san makes an appearance and is seen talking to Amaria. She is surprised by his blond hair and blue eyes because she thought that she was the only one in her village. Shikimi warns her to stay away from Grey-san.

=== Volume 4–5 ===
It is still following the story of Shikimi's past. The village has been experiencing a strange sickness that no one can figure out the cause. Several children of the church have died because of this mysterious illness and soon the whole village is plagued by it. The villagers suspect demons has possessed the town. Eva, having fallen in love with Shikimi confronts him about his marriage to Amaria. She asks him why he never returned her feelings and then kills herself in a fit of madness. Concerned for Amaria's safety, Shikimi runs back to the church, only to find a demon-possessed child feeding on the corpses of the deceased. Shikimi promises to protect Amaria and doses the demon in holy water before running off into the forest with her. He swears that he shall protect her but then suddenly a shadowy figure in the trees attempts to strike Shikimi down with a spear. Amaria protects Shikimi from the blow but she is struck down instead, she dies in Shikimi arms. Grey appears and tells Shikimi that he is not the cause of Amaria's death. He explains that demons have grown strong enough to have control over humans, and that is the cause of all the death and destruction of the town. Shikimi realizes that all the villagers have been possessed by demons. Grey compares the demons to a disease "But what they spread isn't sickness. It's malice and insanity.")Most of them died when they were possessed by the demons and have come back as resurrected zombies, Grey reveals to Shikimi that the only way to prevent these demons from spreading is to destroy them with fire and Shikimi mournfully sets his village ablaze.

=== Volume 6 ===
They say all good things must come to an end, but will this hold true for Shikimi as well? The half-demon priest was making such good progress, but a fun-filled day in the falling snow turns deadly as his demon half takes over. Will Grey finally win their bet?

=== Volume 7 ===
Shikimi remains trapped in his own body, tormented by the memories of those he killed. His memories of Taki lend him the strength he needs to survive...but is it enough to overcome the demons when Taki finally fulfills his promise?

=== Side stories ===
At the end of volume one there is a short side story separate from the plot called "Magic Words." It tells the story of the king of Imulu who has a childlike appearance, despite being much older. He is a very intelligent and refined ruler but is not taken seriously because he looks like a child. He dislikes women because he feels that they only want to be with him for his crown. When Princess Laa D' Seshun comes to his palace for a tutor he can't help but fall for her bold and outspoken personality. She actually met the king when they were both children and he called her beautiful, despite having two different colored eyes. She makes him promise to make her queen when they get older and he agrees. Now much older, the king doesn't realize she was that little girl until she asks him about the promise they made when they were children. He smiles at her and assures her he will keep his promise.

== Characters ==
- Taki Juhas- The main character, 18 years old, in order to repay his father's debt to the church he takes on a job as an assistant for Shikimi. He is stubborn, hard-working, and fearless. He always says what he is thinking. He dislikes dogs, zombies, and giving up.
- Shikimi Farkash- 28 years old, He is mysterious priest that becomes Taki's sensei. He is known as a "sociopath" or emotionally challenged" because of his work. He is always smiling and enjoys reading, drinking tea, making messes, and killing zombies.
- Lazlo "Laz" Varga- 15 years old. She is strong and walks to the beat of her own drum. She is a powerful demon slayer sent to kill Shikimi but ends up falling in love with him.
- Agi- Was abandoned as a puppy over ten years ago, unofficially adopted by Taki. Reborn out of love for her master. She loves Taki, attention, being played with, and fresh blood.
- Grey- Age 26–27, a resurrected demon. He may look like he's sturdy and strong but he originally died because an illness. He refuses to take off his coat otherwise he will burn in the sun. He's the youngest of seven children and became a friend of Shikimi
- Amaria- 20 years old, loves Shikimi. She is a little spontaneous, but more direct than Shikimi.
- Eva-21 years old. She is the female version of Taki, being raised in an environment where she had to be on top of things. Eva is Amaria's childhood friend
- King of Imulu –A young king named Raru, who is finely cultured but hard to please. He is also a tutor for Princess Seshun.
- Laa Seshun- the youngest princess of a tiny kingdom, she has mismatched eyes. She was ridiculed for her different colored eyes as a child but Raru found them beautiful.

== Production and themes ==
In Japan, Tomo Maeda is the creator of a number of manga series in a variety of different genres. Black Sun, Silver Moon is a Shōnen manga, which is aimed at a male audience, and integrates a horror-type style. This particular manga incorporates the dark elements of a supernatural story with the humor of everyday tasks. In an interview with Brigid Alverson, Tomo Maeda explains "I do try to create a kind of balance. If a title is just too dark, it becomes difficult to read and too heavy for the reader, so I like to mix it up and make it entertaining and easy to read."

Christianity and clergy is a popular theme in Japanese manga. In an interview with Brigid Alverson, Maeda talks about why she included Christianity in Black Sun, Silver Moon. She explains "I just really like the priest's outfit. Being Japanese, I don't have a strong religious identity, but I do have an interest in religions, and I found it interesting to work with Christianity as a theme. I did some research in books on Christianity and found it to be a difficult topic." Maeda does not dive much into the actual religion of Christianity, besides the motif of demons. The church, robes, and the image of the cross are the only real representations of Christianity in this manga.

== Publications ==
Black Sun, Silver Moon was created as a seven volumes series containing roughly about 200 pages. It made its first appearance in the shōjo manga magazine Wings on 26 July 2001, concluding on 25 February 2006. It was published by the Japanese publishing company Shinshokan into seven tankōbon volumes between 22 July 2002. It was licensed by the U.S. manga company Go! Comi in 2007. The economic recession experienced in the United States in 2009 created a 20% sales drop in manga. It was calculated that manga volumes published in North America per year dropped from just over 1,500 in 2007 to 695 in 2011. This took a heavy toll on the Go! Comi publishing company, causing the company to fold along with six other manga publishers in the United States. The official website stopped being updated in early 2010 and expired in May of that year. They also had put JManga, an American digital comic site, in charge of online distribution in 2010; however the site was closed in June 2013.

== Reception ==
Kevin King of Booklist reviewed "Although this manga is sure to attract readers, the story is predictable and the art is nothing special" and that "Maeda is banking on the popularity of the horror genre and the "boy love" manga in this cute story." Black Sun, Silver Moon was ranked equal fourth with Dragon Eye and Zombie-Loan on an About.com's reader poll for the best shōnen manga of 2007.
