= After School Nightmare =

Japanese manga series by Setona Mizushiro

- Cover of the first volume of After School Nightmare as published by Akita Shoten, featuring, from left to right, Sou Mizuhashi, Mashiro Ichijo, and Kureha Fujishima

放課後保健室 (Hōkago Hokenshitsu)
- Manga
- Written by: Setona Mizushiro
- Published by: Akita Shoten
- English publisher: NA: Go! Comi; (expired)
- Magazine: Princess
- Original run: 5 June 2004 – 6 November 2007
- Volumes: 10

After School Nightmare (Japanese: 放課後保健室, Hepburn: Hōkago Hokenshitsu; lit. "After School Infirmary") is a Japanese shōjo manga series written and illustrated by Setona Mizushiro. It was serialized from 2004 to 2007 in the manga magazine Princess and collected in ten tankōbon volumes. It was licensed in North America by Go! Comi, with all volumes adapted by Mallory Reaves and edited by Brynne Chandler. The story is about Mashiro Ichijo, an intersex high-school student who is forced by a teacher to work out their gender identity in a collective dream, and Mashiro's romantic relationships with two classmates, one female and one male.

== Plot ==
Mashiro Ichijo is a girls' idol, handsome and kind, but he has been hiding a secret all his life; he's not truly male, nor entirely female. He has the upper body of a male but the lower body of a female. When a mysterious school nurse introduces him to a new class, he finds that in order to graduate he has to go to a world of dreams to find a mysterious key, competing with other classmates to find it. Once this key is found, the student graduates and all other members of the school forget the finder's existence. As he struggles with his gender identity, he tries to decide whether he wants to live as a male and go out with one of the prettiest girls in school or as a female and be with the cute male slacker, both of whom are madly in love with Ichijo.

The final chapter reveals that the whole story is an allegory for an outer story that was hinted at on the first page and then hinted at repeatedly during the course of the story: The school is connected with a ward of pregnant women and when a student graduates, they are born in the real world. Mashiro is reborn as a girl, whose twin brother died right before birth. In the epilogue, the real-world outcome for Kureha Fujishima, Ai Mizuhashi, and Ebizawa are shown – dead. The story ends with the real-world Mashiro and Sou Mizuhashi meeting by coincidence when catching the same train to school.

== Characters ==
Additional information needed

All of the main and secondary characters take part in the dream class at some point during the story.

=== Main characters ===
Mashiro Ichijo (一条 真白, Ichijō Mashiro)
A high school student who is popular among his female classmates, even though he stays distant to protect a tremendous secret: he is neither fully a man nor a woman, as the upper half of his body is physically and genetically male while his lower half is female. Mashiro claims to identify himself as a man, however, he is constantly doubting himself. He tries to act as he believes "men" commonly would. He is sometimes a member of the kendo club, quitting and rejoining a couple of times over the series, in part out of frustration at his inability to defeat Sou in a bout. When Kureha professes her love for him after learning of his secret, Mashiro begins to date her, even while remaining obsessed with Sou.
Dream Self: In the dream world, Mashiro appears as himself in either a male or female school uniform, depending on his self-image at the moment. After finally embracing his identity and feelings, he appears fully as one gender. Occasionally, Mashiro creates two feather-shaped swords, a longer one representing his male side and a shorter one on his female side. The two swords are connected, preventing him from discarding the short sword symbolizing that he cannot get rid of the female aspects of himself, much like he can't get rid of the short sword. The strength of the blades is determined by Mashiro's ability to essentially will them into sharpness. Later on, when his two selves meet and fight, each holds one sword. Twice when Mashiro's belly is cut open while dreaming, a flock of blackbirds flies out, overwhelming his attacker.

Kureha Fujishima (藤島 紅葉, Fujishima Kureha)
She is cheery and bright but has a strong dislike of men. Since Mashiro is very protective of her (and is not entirely male), Kureha soon falls for him. Kureha is very distrustful of Sou, and will take any opportunity to separate Mashiro and Sou. It is revealed in Chapter 2 (Mashiro's second dream in the class) that her distrust of men stems from a brutal rape done to her during a walk home from kindergarten, plus the harsh words she overheard her father say to her mother afterward. However, as the story progresses, she and Sou team up and become friends, which is part of her plan to get revenge on Mashiro for their break-up.
Dream Self: In the dream world, Kureha appears dressed as she was after she was attacked, wearing a ragged raincoat and dripping with rain, her face and eyes concealed by the coat's hood because of shame and rage. She is very vengeful and quick to attack. Later in the sixth book, she becomes a withered version of the tree that she and Mashiro sat under together, and later in volume eight, a knight after overcoming her difficulties. In that same volume, she obtains the key to graduate, but chooses to not graduate. After she wakes the nurse asks her reason why, to which her response is she wishes to see Mashiro graduate, even if that means she may have lost her own chance.

Sou Mizuhashi (水橋 蒼, Mizuhashi Sō)
Coming off as an aloof womanizer, first seen dispassionately with a girl having sex with him, Sou merely has a blunt personality and genuinely tries to fall in love, albeit doing so through sex. Ever since he found out that Mashiro Ichijo was part woman, he has been trying anything to get Ichijo to love him, even going so far as to admit his love to him in the second volume. Sou has an older sister named Ai, whom he has very serious issues with. Ai and Sou's parents had separated when they were children, Ai going to live with their father and Sou with their mother. His mother spending more time on her career, Sou went to visit his sister. When he saw Ai playing with her step-mother and puppy and not the teddy bear that would be her "Sou", he ran away. Feeling betrayed that his sister seemingly moved on, he ended up catching pneumonia after collapsing in the rain. The series of events was so traumatic that he ended up seeing and hearing hallucinations. The illusions can affect him so strongly that he can see an entire room differently from someone else.
Dream Self: Sou's sister, Ai, tells Mashiro that Sou is the Black Knight that torments Mashiro, and later, Sou tells Mashiro that he was hiding behind the knight's armour. Volume nine sees Sou resolve his sister issues, and shows that up to that point Sou's dream self was partly the dream Ai, and partly her teddy bear, which supposedly represented "him" to her. After this, Sou's dream form becomes a dog friendly to Mashiro.

Ai Mizuhashi (水橋 蓝, Mizuhashi Ai)
Sou's older sister, first seen in the dream world. She is dark with a slightly sadistic sense of humor. Ai also claims in volume two to know what happens after a student graduates. Ai actually attends a different school several blocks away, and only sneaked into the dream class to keep Sou from graduating. She has a strong brother complex, claiming she can only graduate once Sou has found the right girl to take care of him while also trying to keep him dependent on her. It is shown that they do have sexual relations with each other. However, it is revealed that the Ai seen so far was nothing more than a hallucination of Sou's mind that had developed after a near-death experience. Afterward, Sou pushed his real sister away and they haven't talked ever since. The real Ai's picture is shown during her funeral after she dies of a brain hemorrhage in volume 9. Instead of the straight hair with long pinned back bangs of Sou's mind, the actual Ai had wavy hair with straight edged bangs.
Dream Self: Ai takes the form of a young girl in Gothic Lolita style clothing and is almost always carrying a teddy bear. Wandering the dream world in lace and sometimes blood, she considers herself as the most important to the dream class. She has also proclaimed herself as the strongest dreamer in the class and displays a great deal of power to back it up. Ai takes this form because during her childhood, she lost and regained Sou, and the teddy bear represents Sou. In volume nine, she is revealed to be a ghost of sorts, a creation of Sou's mind to compensate for thinking that his real sister had betrayed him when he was young. Although he wishes to get rid of her, it seems Sou lacks the willpower to do so.

=== Secondary characters ===
Nurse
A mysterious nurse, whose name is never stated, who takes the students to the basement infirmary so they can take part in a special class on Thursdays. She knows all the new and old students' names and their "issues", like Ichijo's gender. The nurse also takes part in the memory loss when a student "graduates". Though not explicitly stated, the nurse is different for each student and takes the form of the students' mothers. This is hinted as the nurse for Kureha looks different from Ichijo's nurse as well as the fact that Ichijo's nurse looks exactly like Ichijo's mother except with lighter hair. The entrance to the basement infirmary is not accessible except to class members on Thursdays.

Midori Okui (奥井 美登里, Okui Midori)
Midori takes part in the dream class. She was on the Beautification Committee and a straight-A student. As a model student, Midori strived to for R University. However, she believes that her actions and even her personality is simply an act. She gets rejected by the school and forced to apply to a different university, Midori felt that she had finally lost her true self. In the second volume Midori graduates when she hears her own breathing and realizes those are the proof of her being there.
Dream Self : Midori takes the form of herself but has an empty hole where her face is and a similar hole in her chest, showing how empty she feels on the inside.

Itsuki Shinonome (東雲 樹, Shinonome Itsuki)
Itsuki is a child prodigy, at age thirteen, who joins the dream class in the second volume. Itsuki takes Midori's place in the dream realm and graduates in the third volume.
Dream Self: In the dream world Itsuki takes the form of a paper giraffe, showing that he looks down on every one, even though he is weaker than them. He says he knows the real life identities of those he meets in the dream world.

Kazuyuki Shinbashi (新橋 一之, Shinbashi Kazuyuki)
Shinbashi has a crush on Kureha and has watched her from afar, but accepts that he could never be with her. After a mistake in the library has been cleared up, he and Mashiro become good friends. Mashiro tries to help Shinbashi and Kureha become friends, but it backfires and Kureha only gets angry. However, Kureha later asks Shinbashi for his phone number and calls him to talk about Mashiro. Shinbashi sets aside his own feelings to give both Kureha and Mashiro (separately) advice on their relationship.
Dream Self: He takes Itsuki's place in the dream realm in the fourth volume and graduates. He takes on the place of Mashiro's mobile phone. He also has the ability to feel the status of Kureha's dream self.

Asuka Suo (蘇芳 あすか, Suō Asuka)
Asuka was a model earlier in life, but an accident scarred her face and injured her legs. She now uses a wheelchair. She is introduced in the 6th volume, and graduates from the same volume.
Dream Self: She takes on the form of a mermaid with a mask covering her eyes and the top half of her face. She appears weak when she first enters the dream without water around her, and is sitting in her wheelchair. She has a tiara and can apparently cut someone with her breath.

Momoka Ohara (大原 桃花, Ōhara Momoka)
Ohara is a dreamer at the start of the series. She was the lurking hand with the continuous arm that stalk the shadows and fought with Kureha. Ohara never did graduate the class, she simply disappeared when she didn't attend class three times in a row.
Dream Self: She takes form of a hand and a continuously long arm. She has the ability to multiply into many little hands and arms or a giant one to crush her enemies away.

Koichiro Kurosaki (黒崎 晃一郎, Kurosaki Kōichirō)
Mashiro and Sou's senpai in the Kendo club, he is portrayed as a very kind and understanding person. He serves as an 'agony aunt' to Mashiro. However, he is revealed to be the son of the president of an important company, and his outside personality is nothing more than what his father and mother wanted him to be.
Dream Self: It is later revealed that he, and not Sou, is the Black Knight. The Black Knight seems to symbolise his real, darker personality along with his feelings towards his parents. He graduates in the 9th volume.

Ebizawa (海老沢)
A girl in Mashiro and Kureha's class. She's the source of many of the rumours circulating in the school.
Dream Self: She takes the form of a parasitic face that attaches itself to the body of other dreamers. When the parasite is cut off from the host's body, Ebizawa returns to her real appearance, but stays in the dream world.

Sumida
A boy in Kendo club who admires several people over the course of the series. He is Sou's friend.
Dream Self: His form changes in dreams to impersonate the forms of other dreamers. He is very weak in his dream form. In volume ten the impersonating dream student is identified as Sumida.

== Development ==
According to Mizushiro, the story was originally conceived as science fiction, set on board a space-ship. When she began to develop it as a shōjo manga, she moved the setting to a high school, changing the sleeping pods the characters used for shared dreaming into canopied beds. The characters Itsuki Shinonome and Asuka Suo were supposed to be part of the initial class of dreamers with Mashiro, but after serialization was announced in Princess as a horror story, Mizushiro put off introducing them because she thought their dream forms of a giraffe and mermaid were too gentle for an atmosphere of horror.

== Release ==
After School Nightmare was written and illustrated by Setona Mizushiro. It was serialized in the monthly shōjo manga magazine Princess, beginning in the July 2004 issue, released on 5 June 2004, and concluding in the December 2007 issue, released on 6 November 2007. The 39 untitled chapters were collected in ten tankōbon volumes by Akita Shoten under the Princess Comics imprint. It was licensed to be adapted into English in North America by Go! Comi, with all volumes published before the imprint shut down in 2010. It is also licensed in France by Asuka, in Italy by Star Comics, and in Germany by Carlsen Verlag.

No.	Original release date	Original ISBN	North America release date	North America ISBN
01	22 December 2004	978-4-253-19441-9	September 2006	1-933617-16-0
02	16 May 2005	978-4-253-19442-6	January 2007	978-1-933617-17-6
03	16 September 2005	978-4-253-19443-3	April 2007	978-1-933617-24-4
04	16 January 2006	978-4-253-19444-0	July 2007	978-1-933617-33-6
05	16 June 2006	978-4-253-19445-7	October 2007	978-1-933617-47-3
06	16 November 2006	978-4-253-19446-4	January 2008	978-1-933617-48-0
07	16 March 2007	978-4-253-19447-1	April 2008	978-1-933617-62-6
08	16 July 2007	978-4-253-19448-8	August 2008	978-1-933617-63-3
09	16 October 2007	978-4-253-19449-5	November 2008	978-1-933617-70-1
10	16 January 2008	978-4-253-19450-1	February 2009	978-1-933617-71-8

== Reception ==
In 2007, After School Nightmare was nominated for an Eisner Award in the category "Best U.S. Edition of International Material – Japan". The English edition of After School Nightmare was named by the Young Adult Library Services Association as among the 10 best graphic novels for teens for 2008.
