= Cantarella (manga) =

Japanese manga series by You Higuri

- Cover of the first Japanese volume of Cantarella, as published by Akita Shoten

カンタレラ (Kantarera)
- Genre: Dark fantasy; Historical fiction
- Manga
- Written by: You Higuri
- Published by: Akita Shoten
- English publisher: NA: Go! Comi; (expired)
- Imprint: Princess Comics
- Magazine: Princess Gold
- Original run: 2000 – 2010
- Volumes: 12

Cantarella (Japanese: カンタレラ, Hepburn: Kantarera) is a Japanese dark fantasy manga series written and illustrated by You Higuri. Set during the Italian Renaissance, it follows the life of Cesare Borgia, whose soul is damned in a pact made with the Devil. The manga was serialized in Akita Shoten's Princess Gold magazine from 2000 to 2010, with its chapters collected into 12 bound volumes. It was licensed for an English-language release in North America by Go! Comi, who published 10 volumes before going out of business in 2010.

== Synopsis ==
Cesare Borgia was an Italian aristocrat, politician, and condottiero (mercenary leader) during the Renaissance. In the manga, Cesare's father Rodrigo Borgia, a Cardinal, sells his infant son's soul to the Devil as part of a deal that will one day make him Pope Alexander VI. Cesare is consequently shunned by his father, who is unable to see him as anything but an agent of darkness and reminder of his sin. Increasingly alienated, Cesare eventually comes to rely on the dark powers within himself. He becomes obsessed with the idea of conquest and is aided in his political machinations by the assassin Don Michelotto.

== Publication ==
Cantarella was written and illustrated by You Higuri. It was serialized in Akita Shoten's shōjo (girls') manga magazine Princess Gold, starting in 2000. It went on hiatus for four years and two weeks in June 2005, resuming serialization in Princess Gold's September 2009 issue on August 17, 2009. The manga concluded in 2010. Akita Shoten collected the individual chapters into 12 tankōbon (bound volumes) published under the Princess Comics imprint from March 8, 2001, to June 16, 2010.

Go! Comi licensed the manga for an English-language release in North America; they published 10 volumes before going out of business in 2010. Cantarella has also been translated into Traditional Chinese by Ever Glory Publishing, French by Asuka, German by Carlsen Comics, Russian by Palma Press, and Italian by Free Books.

=== Volume list ===
No.	Original release date	Original ISBN	English release date	English ISBN
1	March 8, 2001	978-4-253-19095-4	October 19, 2005	0-9768957-0-6
2	September 13, 2001	978-4-253-19096-1	February 2006	0-9768957-4-9
3	March 20, 2002	978-4-253-19097-8	May 2006	0-9768957-8-1
4	September 19, 2002	978-4-253-19098-5	August 2006	1-933617-02-0
5	March 27, 2003	978-4-253-19099-2	December 2006	1-933617-08-X
6	August 28, 2003	978-4-253-19100-5	March 2007	978-1-933617-09-1
7	December 25, 2003	978-4-253-19208-8	June 2007	978-1-933617-26-8
8	May 27, 2004	978-4-253-19209-5	September 2007	978-1-933617-30-5
9	December 22, 2004	978-4-253-19210-1	December 2007	978-1-933617-39-8
10	June 16, 2005	978-4-253-19268-2	March 2008	978-1-933617-40-4
11	December 16, 2009	978-4-253-19269-9	—	—
12	June 16, 2010	978-4-253-19270-5	—	—

== Reception ==
In 2007, Cantarella was listed as one of the Young Adult Library Services Association's Great Graphic Novels for Teens.

== See also ==
- Cesare – another manga series about Cesare Borgia's early life
