= Akita Shoten =

Japanese publishing company

Akita Publishing Co., Ltd.

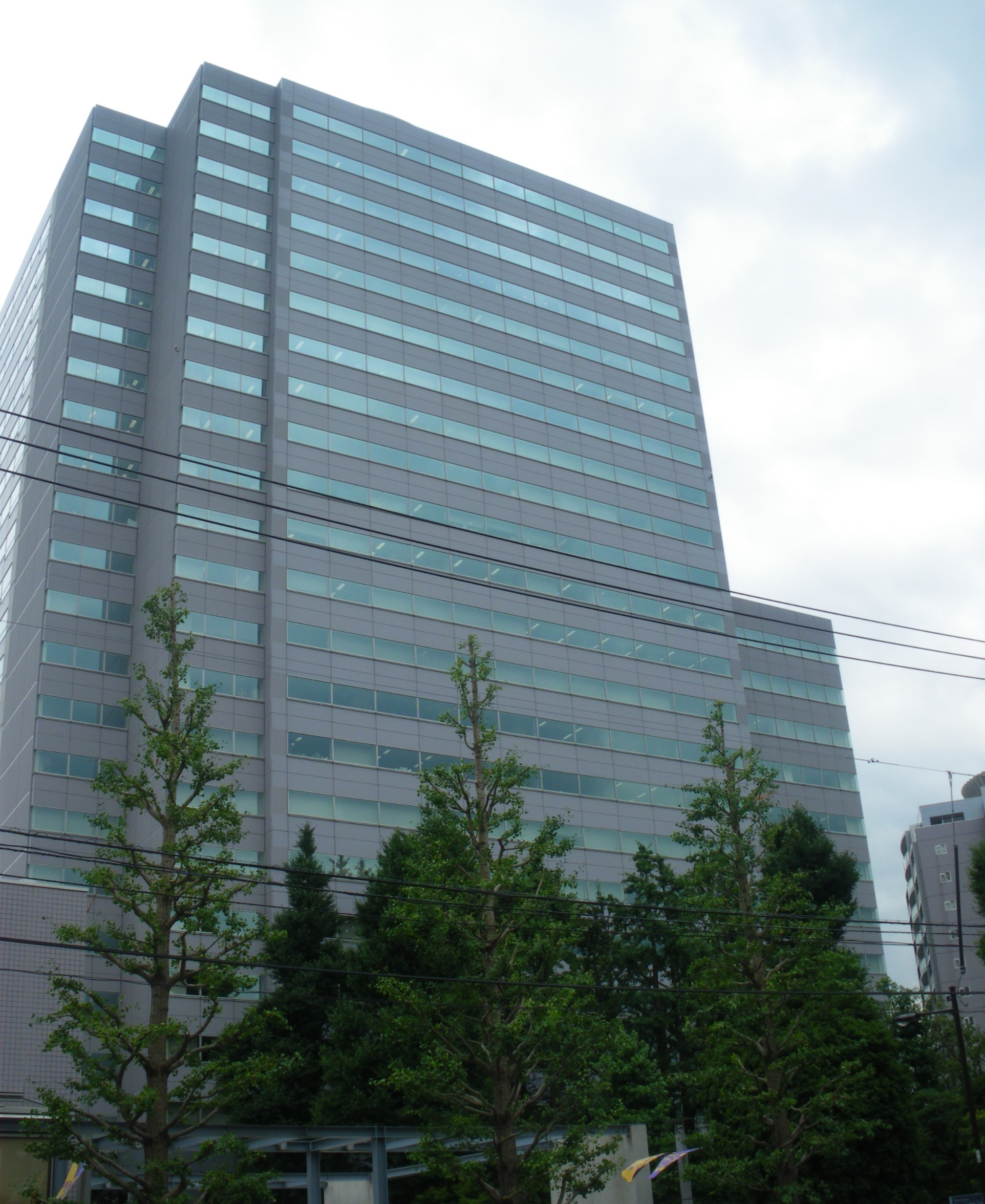
- Headquarters in Bunkyō, Tokyo
- Native name: 株式会社秋田書店
- Romanized name: Kabushiki-gaisha Akita Shoten
- Type: Kabushiki gaisha
- Industry: Manga, magazines
- Founded: 10 August 1948; 78 years ago
- Founder: Teio Akita
- Headquarters: Honkomagome, Bunkyō, Tokyo, Japan
- Key people: Tokuji Yamaguchi (president)
- Products: Published manga
- Number of employees: 165 (2026)
- Website: akitashoten.co.jp

Akita Publishing Co., Ltd. (株式会社秋田書店, Kabushiki-gaisha Akita Shoten) is a Japanese publishing company headquartered in Chiyoda, Tokyo. It was founded by Teio Akita in 1948. As of May 2023, the company's president is Tokuji Yamaguchi. The company is known for publishing the manga magazine Weekly Shōnen Champion, which serialized works such as Osamu Tezuka's Black Jack, Keisuke Itagaki's Baki the Grappler, and Shinji Mizushima's Dokaben.

In January 2025, due to the renovations at the headquarters building, the company established a temporary headquarters in Honkomagome, Bunkyō, Tokyo.

== Magazines ==
=== Male-oriented manga magazines ===
==== Shōnen magazines ====
- Bessatsu Shōnen Champion (別冊少年チャンピオン, Bessatsu Shōnen Chanpion) – Bimonthly (the 12th of month)
- Monthly Shōnen Champion (月刊少年チャンピオン, Gekkan Shōnen Chanpion) – Monthly (the 6th of month)
- Weekly Shōnen Champion (週刊少年チャンピオン, Shūkan Shōnen Chanpion) – Weekly (each Thursday)
- Manga Cross (マンガクロス, Mangakurosu) – Weekly web comics (Tuesday and Thursday)

Defunct:

- Bōken Ō – monthly from 1949 to 1983
- Manga Ō

==== Seinen magazines ====
- Champion Red (チャンピオンレッド, Chanpion Reddo) – Monthly (the 19th of month)
- Dokodemo Young Champion (どこでもヤングチャンピオン, Dokodemo Yangu Chanpion) – Monthly (the 4th Tuesday of every month)
- Golf Comic (ゴルフコミック, Gorufu Komikku) – Monthly (the 1st of every month)
- Play Comic (プレイコミック, Purei Comikku) – Semimonthly (each 2nd and 4th Thursday of the month)
- Young Champion (ヤングチャンピオン, Yangu Chanpion) – Semimonthly (each 2nd and 4th Tuesday of the month)
- Young Champion Retsu (ヤングチャンピオン烈, Yangu Chanpion Retsu) – Bimonthly (the 3rd Monday of every month)

Defunct:

- Champion Red Ichigo (チャンピオンレッドいちご, Chanpion Reddo Ichigo) – Bimonthly (the 5th of month)
- Champion Jack (チャンピオンジャック, Chanpion Jakku)

=== Female-oriented manga magazines ===
- Princess (プリンセス, Purinsesu) – Monthly (the sixth of every month)
- Petit Princess (プチプリンセス, Puchi Purinsesu) – Monthly (the first of every month, digital only)
- Mystery Bonita (ミステリーボニータ, Misutarī Bonīta) – the sixth of every month
- Elegance Eve (エレガンスイブ, Eregansu Ibu) – the twenty-sixth of every month
- For Mrs. (フォアミセス, Foa Misesu) – Monthly (the third of every month)
- For Mrs. Special (フォアミセススペシャル, Foa Misesu Supesharu) – Quarterly
- Love MAX (恋愛 MAX, Rabu Makkusu) – the sixth of every odd month
- Love Cherry Pink (恋愛チェリーピンク, Rabu Cherī Pinku) – the sixth of every even month
- Desir SP (デジールSP, Dejīru Supesharu) – the twenty-eighth of every even month

Defunct:

- Bessatsu Princess (別冊プリンセス, formerly Bessatsu Viva Princess→Viva Princess→Bessatsu Princess)
- Monthly Bonita (ボニータ, predecessor to other Akita Shoten shojo manga spin-off magazines such as Deluxe Bonita, Bonita Eve, Let's Bonita, Candle, Fushigi Mystery, and Mystery Bonita)
- Princess Gold (プリンセスゴールド, Purinsesu Gōrudo)
- Suspiria Mystery (サスペリアミステリー, Sasuperia Misutarī) – the twenty-fourth of every odd month
- Hitomi (ひとみ)

=== Other magazines ===
- Family Computer Champion (ファミコンチャンピオン, Famikon Chanpion) – defunct
- J-TOON – Webtoons

== See also ==
- List of manga published by Akita Shoten
