= Blank Slate (manga) =

Japanese manga series by Aya Kanno

- Cover of the first English volume of Blank Slate, as published by Viz Media

悪性 －アクサガ－ (Akusaga)
- Genre: Adventure, science fiction, suspense
- Manga
- Written by: Aya Kanno
- Published by: Hakusensha
- English publisher: NA: Viz Media
- Imprint: Hana to Yume Comics
- Magazine: Bessatsu Hana to Yume
- Original run: 2005 – 2006
- Volumes: 2

Blank Slate (Japanese: 悪性 －アクサガ－, Hepburn: Akusaga) is a Japanese manga series written and illustrated by Aya Kanno. It was serialized in Hakusensha's shōjo manga magazine Bessatsu Hana to Yume, ending in the March 2006 issue on January 26, 2006. The individual chapters were collected into two bound volumes, which were published by Hakusensha on September 16, 2005, and June 19, 2006. Blank Slate was licensed in English by Viz Media, who released the manga's two volumes on October 7, 2008, and December 2, 2008, with the e-book versions released on January 29, 2013, and February 12, 2013, respectively. The manga has also been localized in France by Delcourt and in Taiwan by Ever Glory Publishing.

== Plot ==
The series takes place in the fictional country of Galay, twenty years after Galay had invaded and obtained rule over the neighboring country of Amata. After Zen, an infamous criminal motivated by his urge for destruction, encounters the daughter of Galay's general, he becomes entangled with the politics of both nations.

== Reception ==
MangaLife's Ysabet Reinhardt MacFarlane notes that nothing about the manga portrays the Shojo Beat label on its front cover. She commends Kanno for being upfront about how "chapter 4 of the bonus episodes has been included as chapter 1", and the original first chapter is not in the book at all; she wasn't initially expecting the story to be serialized, and in retrospect felt that it didn't mesh well with the later material." Graphic Novel Reporter's Casey Brienza commends Kanno's artwork, stating: "Kanno has tremendous range when it comes to her artwork. The soft, sanitized style found in Soul Rescue barely resembles the self-conscious satire of Otomen. Blank Slate sports yet a third look—bleak, brooding, and beautiful. She really takes the opportunity to strut her stuff here. The subtlety and dynamism of her layouts are top notch." About.com's Deb Aoki commends the manga for its "stylish, contemporary artwork with lots of bishōnen (pretty boy) eye-candy", its "unconventional shojo story with more suspense, action and violence than romance", and its "tantalizing undercurrent of erotic tension". However, she criticizes the manga for its "cold, detached storytelling", wooden and unimaginative fight scenes, and a robotic main character. Comic Book Bin's Leroy Douresseaux commends the manga for its "shooting, blood splatters, and a mysterious, remorseless, too-cool character", and further notes that the manga should be a Shonen Jump Advanced title rather than a Shojo Beat one. Mania.com's Thomas Zoth comments on Kanno's use of "a much grittier, darker style for this neo-noir story" when compared to Otomen. He condemns the massive plot in the second volume, "where the twist effectively negates the entire point of the first three-fourths of the narrative." PopCultureShock's Michelle Smith pans the "very dull" first chapter in terms of characters and setting but notes an immediate improvement in the second chapter. She admires "the economy of the storytelling—no extraneous information is offered nor is any essential detail lacking—as well as the way the series ends." Jason Thompson, in the online appendix to Manga: The Complete Guide, commends "Aya Kanno's impressive artwork, which features sexy guys and more than adequate action scenes." Conversely, Carlo Santos of Anime News Network criticizes the manga's first volume for its "lazy art, generic action-adventure plotting, and trying-to-sound-cool-and-angsty-but-failing-miserably dialogue". He notes, however, that "each story cleverly twists into the next, creating new experiences for our antihero, as well as fleshing out the details of the bitter world he lives in."
