= Princess (magazine) =

Japanese manga magazine

- Cover of the January 2014 issue, published by Akita Shoten on December 6, 2013
- Categories: Shōjo manga
- Frequency: Monthly
- First issue: December 6, 1974; 51 years ago
- Company: Akita Shoten
- Country: Japan
- Based in: Tokyo
- Language: Japanese
- Website: akitashoten.co.jp/princess

Princess (Japanese: 月刊プリンセス, Hepburn: Gekkan Purinsesu) is a monthly Japanese shōjo manga magazine published by Akita Shoten. It launched in December 1974 and is released on the sixth of each month. It has inspired several spin-off publications, including Bessatsu Viva Princess, renamed Viva Princess (1976–1990), (Note: Bessatsu Viva Princess was renamed Viva Princess in 1986 when it changed from a quarterly to a bimonthly release.) Princess Gold (1979–2020); Bessatsu Princess (1990–1994); and Princess Gold's own spin-off, Petit Princess, launched in 2002 and published on the first of each month.

== Serializations ==
=== Current ===
- Crest of the Royal Family by Chieko Hosokawa (since 1976)
- Matsurika Kanriden: Koukyuu Nyokan, Kimagure Koutei ni Misomerare by Rinne Ishida and Waka Takase (Since 2018)
- His Majesty the Demon King's Housekeeper by Mika Kajiyama and Saiko Wadori (since 2019)
- Usoyomi to Gishoku no О̄jo by Mizue Odawara (since 2020)
- Toki o Kakeru Sukeban Deka by Saori Muronaga (since 2021)
- Re: Sukeban Deka by Ashibi Fukui (since 2021)
- Touken Ranbu: Outdoor Ibun Touken Camp by Ikra, based on Touken Ranbu. (since 2022)
- Kimi ga Loafer wo Haitara by Towa Oshima (since 2022)
- Hōkago Pedal High Cadence by Kineko Abekawa, ikra, Yukiko Tonō and Wataru Midori (since 2023)
- Yōkihi, Kirara by Senta Nakazawa based on the works of Baku Yumemakura, Yoshitaka Amano, and Shōkoku Kanō (since 2023)
- Sakikaerihime no Homura Uta: Suterareta Hana wa Fukushuu ni Mau by Mosco (since 2023)
- Byakka Ryouran: Shiroki Shoujo to Tensai Gunshi by Ai Kurimi, based on the Sohryuden: Legend of the Dragon Kings novels by Yoshiki Tanaka (since 2023)
- Saint Mariya by Masami Kurumada and Seira Shimotsuki, a spin-off of the Saint Seiya franchise (since 2024)
- Shirayuki Yume to n-Nin no Yume Kareshi by Junko (since 2024)
- Ka no Yo no Kemono ga Miru Yume wa by Maki Fujita (since 2024)

=== Former ===
- Bride of Deimos by Etsuko Ikeda and Yuuho Ashibe (1974–1990)
- Angélique by Toshie Kihara (1977–1979)
- Olympus no Pollon by Hideo Azuma (1977–1979)
- From Eroica with Love by Yasuko Aoike (1979–2007) (Note: From Eroica with Love began serialization in Bessatsu Viva Princess in 1976. It transferred to Princess in 1979, where it ran until 2007. The manga transferred to Princess Gold in 2008.)
- A, A Prime by Moto Hagio (one-shot; 1981)
- Go Go Heaven!! by Keiko Yamada (1994-1999)
- A.I. Revolution by Yuu Asami (1994–2003)
- Lady Victorian by Naoko Moto (1998–2007)
- VS: Versus by Keiko Yamada (1999-2001)
- Kid's Joker by Maki Fujita (1999-2000)
- Three in Love by Shioko Mizuki (2000-2002)
- Yō (English: By the Sword) by Sanami Matoh (2000-2003) (Note: By the Sword was serialized in Princess from 2000 to 2003, after which it transferred to Biblos where it ran until its conclusion in 2005.)
- Her Majesty's Dog by Mick Takeuchi (2000–2002) (Note: Her Majesty's Dog was serialized in Princess from 2000 to 2002, after which it transferred to Princess Gold.)
- Platinum Garden by Maki Fujita (2001-2006)
- X-Day by Setona Mizushiro (2002)
- Bogle by Shino Taira and Yūko Ichijū (2002-2003)
- Crossroad by Shioko Mizuki (2002–2005)
- Tenshi Ja Nai!! by Takako Shigematsu (2003–2006)
- The Knockout Makers by Kyoko Hashimoto (2003–2005)
- Oyayubihime Infinity by Toru Fujieda (2004-2006)
- After School Nightmare by Setona Mizushiro (2004–2007)
- Time Guardian by Daimuro Kishi and Tamao Ichinose (2005-2006)
- Cy-Believers by Shioko Mizuki (2006-2007)
- Dragon Girl by Toru Fujieda (2006-2008)
- Love Master A by Kyouko Hashimoto (2006)
- Ultimate Venus by Takako Shigematsu (2006-2009)
- Shinobi Life by Shoko Conami (2006–2012)
- Trill on Eden by Maki Fujita (2007-2010)
- Tableau Gate by Rika Suzuki (2007-2021)
- Black Rose Alice by Setona Mizushiro (2008–2011) (Note: Black Rose Alice was serialized in Princess from 2008 to 2011. The manga resumed serialization under the title Black Rose Alice: D.C. al fine in Flowers in 2020.)
- Heart Break Club by Nikki Asada (2010-2018)
- Harem Days: The Seven-Starred Country by Momo Sumomo (2011-2017)
- The Fox's Kiss by Saki Aikawa (2012-2014)
- Zombie Cherry by Shoko Conami (2012–2016)
- Nekozuka-san'chi no Gokyōdai by Takako Shigematsu (2012-2013)
- Requiem of the Rose King by Aya Kanno (2013–2022)
- Mysteria Romantica by Saki Aikawa (2014-2016)
- Beasts of Abigaile by Spica Aoki (2015–2018)
- Miracle Nikki (English: Love Nikki) by Mika Sakurano and Nikki inc. (2017-2019)
- Rosen Blood by Kachiru Ishizue (2017–2022)
- Moonlight Moratorium by Saki Aikawa (2017-2019)
- Ikemen Sengoku: Tenkabito no Onna ni Naru Ki wa Nai ka by Mika Kajiyama (2017-2018)
- Boukoku no Marguerite by Momo Sumomo (2018-2025)
- Yakusoku wa Toshokan no Katasumi de by Maki Fujita (2019–2020)
- Kasen Kōshu Yawa: Sono Reijin, Kōkyū no Yami o Kiru by Yū Minamoto (2019-2024)
- Ano Kane wo Narasu no wa Sukunakutemo Omae ja nai by Nikki Asada (2019-2021)
- Samurai ga Tensei Shitara Idol ni Natta Hanashi by Naked Ape (2019-2020)
- Onmyōji, Abe no Seimei by Mitsuru Yūki and Arata Kawabata (2020-2024)
- Hiiro no Uta by Maki Fujita (2020-2022)
- King of Idol: Bara-Ō no Gakuen by Kineko Abekawa (2021–2023)
- Bokura no Sennen to Kimi ga Shinu Made no 30-ka Kan by Naked Ape (2021-2024)
- Sukeban Deka Pretend by Sai Ihara and Shingi Hosokawa (2021-2024)
- Requiem of the Rose King: The Queen and the Rose Knight by Aya Kanno (2022-2023)
