= Dave Lanphear =

American comic book artist (1968–2026)

- Lanphear in 2020
- Born: June 5, 1968 Lansing, Michigan, U.S.
- Died: August 18, 2026 (aged 58)
- Area: Comic book artist
- Spouse: Laura Bee

Dave Lanphear (June 5, 1968 – August 18, 2026) was an American comic book artist.

== Early life and career ==
Lanphear was born in Lansing, Michigan on June 5, 1968. He attended California State University, Stanislaus, studying commercial art with a minor in journalism from 1985 to 1988. He worked as a newspaper illustrator until 1989, and worked for Malibu Comics in the early 1990s.

Later in his career, in 1994, Lanphear joined Comicraft, a comic company in Los Angeles, California. He lettered for numerous comics such as Batman: The Long Halloween, Densha Otoko, Thunderbolt, Stan Lee Meets..., Spider-Man Noir, Oyayubihime Infinity, Superman '78, Fraggle Rock and The Mighty Avengers. In 2012, he was nominated for a Harvey Award in the category Best Letterer, and in 2014, he was nominated again.

== Personal life and death ==
Lanphear was married to Laura Bee. Their marriage lasted until Lanphear's death in 2026.

Lanphear died from complications of diabetes on August 18, 2026, at the age of 58.
