= Shigematsu =

Shigematsu is a Japanese name. It may refer to:

== People ==
=== Surname ===
- Kentaro Shigematsu (重松 健太郎, born 1991), football player
- Kiyoshi Shigematsu (重松 清, born 1963), Japanese writer
- Morio Shigematsu (重松 森雄, born 1940), Japanese long-distance runner
- Naoki Shigematsu (重松 直樹, born 1977), Japanese former figure skater
- Sōiku Shigematsu (重松 宗育, born 1943), Japanese priest
- Takako Shigematsu (しげまつ 貴子), Japanese manga artist
- Tetsuro Shigematsu (born 1971), radio broadcaster
- Yoshinori Shigematsu (重松 良典, born 1930), Japanese football player

=== Given name ===
- Shigematsu Sakaibara (酒井原 繁松, 1898 – 1947), Japanese admiral in the Imperial Japanese Navy
