= Ikemen Vampire =

2017 video game

- Ikemen Vampire: Temptation in the Dark
- Official promotional artwork

イケメンヴァンパイア 偉人たちと恋の誘惑 (Ikemen Vanpaia: Ijin-tachi to Koi no Yūwaku)
- Video game
- Developer: Cybird
- Designed by: Shiro Yamada
- Platform: Android iOS
- Released: JP: July 31, 2017; WW: July 1, 2019
- Live-action film

Napoleon and Me
- Directed by: Yusuke Koroyasu
- Produced by: Yuika Arai; Koji Ichihashi
- Written by: Noriko Suzuki
- Released: July 2, 2021
- Runtime: 84 minutes
- Manga

Ikemen Vampire: Arthur Conan Doyle Edition
- Written by: Riko Suzuki
- Illustrated by: Misa Akari
- Published by: Cybird
- Imprint: CYBIRD Books
- Original run: May 22, 2022 – March 20, 2024
- Volumes: 15

Ikemen Vampire: Temptation in the Dark (イケメンヴァンパイア 偉人たちと恋の誘惑, Ikemen Vanpaia: Ijin-tachi to Koi no Yūwaku) is a Japanese otome romance game released for Android and iOS on July 31, 2017, by Cybird. It is part of Cybird's Ikemen series.

The game was later released in English on July 1, 2019. A live-action spin-off film, Napoleon and Me, starring Rina Takeda and Shogo Hama, was released in 2021.

== Premise ==
During a trip to France, the protagonist finds a mysterious door to a mansion. There, they meet several male historical figures who agreed to become vampires. The protagonist must survive a month living alongside them.

== Gameplay ==
Ikemen Vampire: Temptation in the Dark is a dating simulator game. The player controls a female protagonist with an in-game avatar that can be customized. They can go on dates with male characters, accumulate points and unlock a special epilogue with one of them depending on the choices made along the way. The player receives five free Chapter Tickets daily to progress through the story.

== Characters ==
- Napoleon Bonaparte – Voiced by: Nobunaga Shimazaki
- Wolfgang Amadeus Mozart – Voiced by: Toshiyuki Toyonaga
- Leonardo da Vinci – Voiced by: Kenjiro Tsuda
- Arthur Conan Doyle – Voiced by: Ryohei Kimura
- Vincent van Gogh – Voiced by: Yoshihiko Aramaki
- Theodorus van Gogh – Voiced by: Hisanori Sato
- Osamu Dazai (太宰治, Dazai Osamu) – Voiced by: Taku Yashiro
- Isaac Newton – Voiced by: Shouta Aoi
- Jean d'Arc – Voiced by: Toshiyuki Someya
- William Shakespeare – Voiced by: Daisuke Hirakawa
- Comte de Saint-Germain – Voiced by: Kazuma Horie
- Sebastian – Voiced by: Shuta Morishima
- Vlad – Voiced by: Soma Saito
- Johann Georg Faust – Voiced by: Shinichiro Kamio
- Charles-Henri Sanson – Voiced by: Ryuichi Kijima
- Galileo Galilei – Voiced by: Makoto Furukawa
- Francis Drake – Voiced by: Tasuku Hatanaka

== Development and release ==
On March 19, 2017, Cybird announced Ikemen Vampire: Temptation in the Dark as a way of celebrating the fifth anniversary of the Ikemen series. The illustrator Shiro Yamada, who had previously worked on Ikemen Sengoku: Romances Across Time, was responsible for the character designs. The theme song, "Rouge", had its lyrics written by Jun (YOMI of the rock band Nightmare), who also performed it. The song was composed by Tomoyuki Enya.

The game was released for Android and iOS on July 31, 2017.

The English version was scheduled for release in spring 2019. The game was released by Cybird in English on July 1, 2019.

== Reception ==
Connor Derrick, writing for Pocket Gamer, included Ikemen Vampire in their "Best mobile otome games" list. He praised the soundtrack and the attention to detail. Overall, Derrick described it as "one of our personal favourites".

A 2019 article by Tamao, on 4Gamer.net, described how scenes depicting or suggesting blood-sucking created a sensual atmosphere for the game. They appreciated Shiro Yamada's character designs and mentioned being moved to tears by a certain scene.

== Other media ==
=== Live-action film ===
A live-action film titled Napoleon and Me (ナポレオンと私, Naporeon to Watashi), directed by Yusuke Koroyasu and starring Rina Takeda and Shogo Hama, was released on July 2, 2021. The film follows Haruko Ohara (大原春子; played by Takeda), a 28-year-old working as a sales assistant at a web production company. Unhappy with her life, she downloads a dating sim, only to have one of the love interests, Napoleon (played by Hama), appear right in front of her. The film’s theme song, "Realizer", is performed by Urashimasakatasen.

=== Stage plays ===
The first stage play adaptation, Ikemen Vampire: Temptation of Love with Great Figures The Stage: Episode 0 (「イケメンヴァンパイア◆偉人たちと恋の誘惑」THE STAGE ～Episode.0～), written by Kaori Miura, was performed at EX Theater Roppongi from April 12 to April 16, 2019. A sequel titled Ikemen Vampire: Temptation of Love with Great Figures The Stage: Episode 1 (「イケメンヴァンパイア◆偉人たちと恋の誘惑」THE STAGE ～Episode.1～), written by Kosuke Hayakawa, was originally intended to have two runs. One run in Tokyo was scheduled to run from April 9 to April 12, 2020, while another in Osaka was planned to run from April 17 to April 20, 2020. Both were delayed due to the COVID-19 pandemic. The play was performed in Tokyo at Theater 1010 from April 23 to April 29, 2021.

Cast
Character	Episode 0	Episode 1
Napoleon Bonaparte	Taiga Akiyama	Yusuke Matsuzaki
Wolfgang Amadeus Mozart	Kento Tomioka	Kento Tomioka
Leonardo da Vinci	Hikaru Inaba	Kota Matsumoto
Arthur Conan Doyle	Nobuki Fukushi	Nobuki Fukushi
Vincent van Gogh	Hinata Matsumoto	Kazuya Yuki
Theodorus van Gogh	Rui Yokoo	Rui Yokoo
Osamu Dazai	Goro Takeishi	Goro Takeishi
Isaac Newton	Kazuharu Ara	Kazuharu Ara
Jean d'Arc	Masashi Azuma	Masashi Azuma
William Shakespeare	Minami Tsurimoto	Minami Tsurimoto
Comte de Saint-Germain	Akira	Akira
Sebastian	Shinya Hasegawa	Shinya Hasegawa
Vlad	—	Yoshiki Tani
Johann Georg Faust	—	Fumitaka Kuroki
Charles-Henri Sanson	—	Tatsuki Jonin

=== Manga ===
Ikemen Vampire: Arthur Conan Doyle Edition (コミカライズ版 イケメンヴァンパイア◆アーサー・コナン・ドイル編) was serialized digitally by Cybird from May 22, 2022, to March 20, 2024, concluding with its 15th volume. It is based on a story concept by Riko Suzuki and illustrated by Misa Akari. In the manga, the protagonist's name is Mitsuki (美月), as decided by a Twitter poll.
