= Naoko Moto =

Japanese manga artist

Naoko Moto もと なおこ
- Born: Osaka Prefecture, Japan
- Notable works: Lady Victorian

Naoko Moto (もと なおこ, Moto Naoko) (born July 16) is a Japanese manga artist. Moto made her debut in the comic magazine Princess GOLD in 1985. She has been writing and publishing manga stories which are mainly set in England, in the Victorian age. Her representative works are The Corset with Wings (Corset ni Tsubasa), Lady Victorian and Faraway, Lovely Dreams (Harukanari, Itoshi Roman).

== Life and works ==
Born in Osaka Prefecture, Moto started doujin activities in around 1982. She made her debut with Sorairo tea time (宇宙色ティータイム) in the July 1985 issue of commercial manga magazine Princess GOLD, published by Akita Shoten. After her debut, she illustrated books by Erika Tachihara (ja) and other writers.

She started to contribute and publish her manga stories in Princess manga magazine. Several more of her stories appeared in magazines and were published in tankōbon format, and she started to build up her base plot and themes. Her first long and serialized manga story is Harukanari, Itoshi Roman, which ran from September 1992 to July 2000 and was later published as 14 tankōbon volumes. It is a mysterious romance with supernatural elements set in Japan, though characters are of English descent.

Naoko Moto's second long and serialized story is Lady Victorian, which ran from December 1998 to March 2007 and was published in 20 tankōbon volumes. Lady Victorian is set in the Victorian age, England, where the heroine, a young girl named Bluebell, has the dream of working and getting success as a good governess in London. Alongside this, the story follows the orphan boy Argent Gray's life as a puppet of fortune. Though Argent is a man, he plays the role of Lady Ethel, the daughter of the marquis. He finds his origin and the name and life of his true parents.

Running from January 2008 to January 2012 was her long and serialized story The Corset with Wings, a 10 volume manga. It was highly regarded and was nominated for the 16th Tezuka Osamu Cultural Prize and to Kono Manga ga Sugoi! 2012. Set in the Victorian and Edwardian ages in England, it is the story of Chris, who is sent to the girls-only boarding school Desdemona after her father died. From a world oppressed by rules, Chris grows and opens up her own future.

Moto also adapted Harlequin romance stories in manga format and published them in Harlequin magazines. Some works were published in tankōbon, and others were later published as digital comics. Naoko Moto has constantly contributed manga works to magazines for around 40 years, and they have almost all been published as tankōbon.

Naoko Moto describes herself as a manga artist who mainly draws manga stories about England set in around the 19th century.

=== Selected manga list ===
- Harukanari, Itoshi Roman (悠かなり愛し夢幻(ロマン)), 14 volumes, Princess comics (1992–0925 to 2000–0713), Akita Shoten
- Melody and Christopher (メロディー&クリストファー), 2 volumes, Princess comics, Akita Shoten
- Christmas monogatari (Christmas物語), Princess comics (1993–1210), Akita Shoten
- Hoshi no Nohara wo Yukō (星の野原をゆこう), Princess comics (1995–0810), Akita Shoten
- Lady Victorian (レディー・ヴィクトリアン), 20 volumes, Princess comics (1998–1218 to 2007–0316), Akita Shoten
- Dear Holmes (Dearホームズ), 2 volumes, Bonita comics, Akita Shoten
- The Corset with Wings (コルセットに翼), 10 volumes, Princess comics (2008–0116 to 2012–0116), Akita Shoten
- A Tale of Riegienda (リエギエンダ物語), 4 volumes, Flex Comix (2008–0212 to 2008–0512), [revised]
- Drina-hime Dōwa – Queen Victoria Bōkendan (ドリーナ姫童話―クイーン・ヴィクトリア冒険譚), Princess comics (2010–0816), Akita Shoten
- Girflet-ryō no Hitsuji-tachi (ガーフレット寮の羊たち), 6 volumes, Princess comics (2012–1116 to 2016–0316), Akita Shoten
- An to Kyōju no Rekishi-dokei (アンと教授の歴史時計), 3 volumes, Princess comics (2016–0115 to 2018–0416), Akita Shoten
- Uri-watasareta Shukujo (売り渡された淑女), 1 volume, Harlequin Comics Kirara (2018–0310). written by Annie Barrows, HarperCollins Japan
- Tenshi ga Nozokimi (天使がのぞきみ―英国貴族と領民たちのひみつ), 5 volumes, Princess comics (2017–0915 to 2020–0616), Akita Shoten
- Koi no Seizu to Neko-biyori (恋の星図と猫日和), 3 volumes, Princess comics (2023–0713 to 2024–0816), Akita Shoten

=== Illustration ===
- Hana Mmonogatari (花ものがたり) by Erika Tachihara (ja), Shogakukan
- Ame wo Yobu Shōjo (雨を呼ぶ少女) by Arimi Yazaki (ja), Kodansha
- Kagami no naka no Lemon (鏡の中のれもん) by Saori Kumi (ja), Shueisha

== Reception ==
It is not easy to find that books or specialists who directly mention her and criticize her works. Ariko Kawabata (ja) and Riko Murakami (ja) mention Moto as representative manga artist who published Victorian manga stories from 1998 (the start point of Lady Victorian), along with the famous Emma by Kaoru Mori. They talk that Moto has published Lady Victorian, Corset with Wings, and Girflet-ryō no Hitsiji-tachi. at chapter 3 "Beginning and Development of Victorian manga" in the discussion (paper) "Shōjo manga and Neo-Victorianism". Kawabata and Mori talk about the artists of the Year 24 Group, Yasuko Sakata, Kaoru Mori, Akiko Hatsu, and especially Yana Toboso (author of Black Butler), who have had the relations of development of Victorian manga in Japan.

Mangapedia (ja) introduces 5 Maid manga. Kawabata and Mori mention two artists in their paper, including Moto, among five.

On the other hand, Anna Maria Jones (University of Central Florida, Florida, USA) mentioned Moto's Sherlock Holmes story Dear Holmes, comparing Yana Toboso's Black Butler. in "Palimpsestuous" Attachments. While Waiyee Loh discussed in her doctorate thesis: Empire of Culture: Contemporary British and Japanese Imaginings of Victorian Britain in April, 2016. Loh mentions Moto's Lady Victorian, analyzing its depictions of the various scenes in the manga.
