= Requiem of the Rose King =

Japanese manga series by Aya Kanno

- The cover of the first manga volume, depicting Richard III (right) and Henry VI (left)

薔薇王の葬列 (Bara-Ō no Sōretsu)
- Genre: Dark fantasy; Historical drama; Romance
- Manga
- Written by: Aya Kanno
- Published by: Akita Shoten
- English publisher: NA: Viz Media
- Imprint: Princess Comics
- Magazine: Monthly Princess
- Original run: 4 October 2013 – 6 January 2022
- Volumes: 17
- Manga

King of Idol: Bara-Ō no Gakuen
- Written by: Kineko Abekawa
- Published by: Akita Shoten
- Imprint: Princess Comics
- Magazine: Monthly Princess
- Original run: 6 January 2021 – 6 September 2023
- Volumes: 2
- Novel

Bara-Ō no Sōretsu Original Novel: Itsutsu no Makuai
- Written by: Yō Makusu
- Published by: Akita Shoten
- Published: 15 December 2021
- Anime television series
- Directed by: Kentarō Suzuki
- Written by: Hiroki Uchida
- Music by: Kow Otani
- Studio: J.C.Staff
- Licensed by: Crunchyroll; SA/SEA: Medialink
- Original network: Tokyo MX, SUN, KBS Kyoto, BS11
- English network: US: Crunchyroll Channel
- Original run: 9 January 2022 – 26 June 2022
- Episodes: 24
- Manga

Bara-Ō no Sōretsu: Gaiden
- Written by: Aya Kanno
- Published by: Akita Shoten
- Imprint: Princess Comics
- Magazine: Monthly Princess
- Original run: 4 March 2022 – 6 September 2023
- Volumes: 3
- icon

Requiem of the Rose King (Japanese: 薔薇王の葬列, Hepburn: Bara-Ō no Sōretsu) is a Japanese manga series written and illustrated by Aya Kanno. Loosely based on the Shakespearean plays Henry VI, Part 3 and Richard III, the series follows an intersex version of Richard III during the tumultuous Wars of the Roses (1455–1487) period in English history. The manga was serialized in Akita Shoten's Monthly Princess magazine from October 2013 to January 2022, with its chapters collected into 17 bound volumes as of December 2021. It is licensed in English by Viz Media. It has inspired three drama CDs, two spin-off manga series, an original novel, a stage play, and an anime television series adaptation produced by J.C.Staff, which aired from January to June 2022.

== Plot ==
As the Kingdom of England is torn between the House of York and the House of Lancaster—each claiming their leader to be the rightful king—young Richard III, the intersex son of the Duke of York, is fighting a battle within himself. Despised by his mother, adored by his father, and alienated from most others, Richard grapples with frightful spirits haunting him, unsteady and unintentional alliances with his enemies, and his own passion for a throne.

== Characters ==
Richard III
Voiced by: Mitsuki Saiga (drama CDs, anime) (Japanese); Ciarán Strange (English)
Third son of Richard Duke of York, younger brother of Edward IV and George, and eventually the third and final Yorkist king of England. Richard is raging a battle inside. He feels alienated because he is intersex.
Henry VI
Voiced by: Daisuke Namikawa (drama CDs), Hikaru Midorikawa (anime) (Japanese); Landon McDonald (English)
Head of the Lancaster family and King of England.
Queen Margaret
Voiced by: Sayaka Ohara (anime)
Wife of Henry VI and Queen of England.
Prince Edward of Lancaster
Voiced by: Yoshitsugu Matsuoka (drama CDs), Kōhei Amasaki (anime)
Son of Henry VI and Margaret and Prince of Wales.
Catesby
Voiced by: Yoshimasa Hosoya (drama CD), Satoshi Hino (anime) (Japanese); Ian Sinclair (English)
Richard III's servant.
Warwick
Voiced by: Takehito Koyasu (drama CD), Satoshi Mikami (anime) (Japanese); Brent Mukai (English)
Known as the "Kingmaker", a powerful supporter of first the York family and then the Lancaster family.
Richard Plantagenet, Duke of York
Voiced by: Show Hayami (anime) (Japanese); J. Michael Tatum (English)
First leader of the York family, husband of Cecily, father of Edward IV, George, Duke of Clarence, and Richard III.
Cecily Neville, Duchess of York
Voiced by: Aya Hisakawa (anime) (Japanese); Morgan Garrett (English)
Wife of Richard Plantagenet, mother of Edward IV, George, Duke of Clarence, and Richard III. Despises her son Richard as a monster for being intersex.
Edward IV of York
Voiced by: Takuya Satō (drama CD), Kohsuke Toriumi (anime) (Japanese); Jason Liebrecht (English)
Oldest son of Richard Duke of York, older brother of Richard and George, second leader of the York family, and first Yorkist king of England.
George, Duke of Clarence
Voiced by: Yasuaki Takumi (anime) (Japanese); Aaron Campbell (English)
Second son of Richard Duke of York, younger brother of Edward IV and older brother of Richard.
Joan of Arc
Voiced by: Aoi Yūki (anime) (Japanese); Kayleigh McKee (English)
A French warrior woman who fought for her people in the Hundred Year's War. Believed by the English to be a witch. Appears in visions to Richard III to torment him.
Anne Neville
Voiced by: Sayumi Suzushiro (anime) (Japanese); Emi Lo (English)
Youngest daughter of Warwick. Married first to Prince Edward of Lancaster and then to Richard III.
Isabelle Neville
Voiced by: Ayumi Mano (anime)
Oldest daughter of Warwick. Wife of George and Duchess of Clarence.
Queen Elizabeth
Voiced by: Shizuka Itō (anime)
Wife of Edward IV and later Queen of England. Secretly seeks revenge on Edward for the death of her first husband Sir John Grey.
Edward V
Oldest son of Edward IV and Queen Elizabeth and briefly the second Yorkist king of England.
Richard, Duke of York
Second son of Edward IV and Queen Elizabeth.
Beth
Daughter of Edward IV and Queen Elizabeth.
Richard Grey
Son of Queen of Elizabeth and Sir John Grey. Half-brother to Edward V, Richard, Duke of York and Beth.
Earl Rivers
Voiced by: Haruki Ishiya (anime)
Brother of Queen Elizabeth.
Buckingham
Voiced by: Riho Sugiyama (anime; first cour), Tomokazu Sugita (anime; second cour)
Ally to Richard III.
Jane Shore
Voiced by: Yūko Kaida (anime)
Witch and mistress to first Edward IV and then Lord Hastings.
Lord Hastings
Ally first to Richard III and then to the Woodville family.
James Tyrell
Voiced by: Hikaru Midorikawa (anime)
The murderer of the Princes in the Tower.
Albany
Brother of King James III of Scotland and would-be king of Scotland. Ally to Richard III.
Thomas Stanley
Earl of Derby and ally of Queen Elizabeth.
Margaret Pole
Daughter of George, Duke of Clarence and Isabelle Neville.
Edward Plantagenet
Son of George, Duke of Clarence and Isabelle Neville.
Edward of Middleham
Alleged son of Richard III and Anne Neville.
Richmond
Voiced by: Akira Ishida (anime)
Nephew of Henry VI and stepson of Thomas Stanley. Richard III's final rival for control of the throne of England.

== Media ==
=== Manga ===
Requiem of the Rose King was written and illustrated by Aya Kanno. It was serialized in Akita Shoten's shōjo (girls') manga magazine Monthly Princess, starting in the magazine's November 2013 issue on 4 October 2013. On 4 June 2021, Kanno announced that she had completed the storyboard for the final Requiem of the Rose King chapter. On 6 October 2021, Monthly Princess revealed that the series would end in four chapters. Requiem of the Rose King concluded in the magazine's February 2022 issue on 6 January 2022. Akita Shoten collects the series' individual chapters into tankōbon (bound volumes) published under their Princess Comics imprint; the 17th and final volume will be released in Japan on 16 June 2022.

Internationally, the series is licensed for an English-language release in North America by Viz Media under the company's Shojo Beat imprint. It is also licensed in French by Éditions Ki-oon, in German by Carlsen Comics, in Polish by Waneko, in Spanish by Ediciones Tomodomo, in Italian by Edizioni Star Comics, and in Chinese by Tong Li Publishing.

==== Volumes ====
No.	Original release date	Original ISBN	English release date	English ISBN
1	14 March 2014	978-4-253-27181-3	10 March 2015	978-1-4215-6778-5
2	18 September 2014	978-4-253-27182-0	8 September 2015	978-1-4215-8090-6
3	16 January 2015	978-4-253-27183-7	12 January 2016	978-1-4215-8259-7
4	16 July 2015	978-4-253-27184-4	10 May 2016	978-1-4215-8644-1
5	16 December 2015	978-4-253-27185-1	8 November 2016	978-1-4215-8988-6
6	16 June 2016	978-4-253-27186-8	9 May 2017	978-1-4215-9268-8
7	16 January 2017	978-4-253-27187-5 (SE); 978-4-253-18192-1 (LE)	14 November 2017	978-1-4215-9720-1
8	14 July 2017	978-4-253-27188-2	8 May 2018	978-1-9747-0027-1
9	16 January 2018	978-4-253-27189-9	13 November 2018	978-1-9747-0225-1
10	13 July 2018	978-4-253-27190-5	14 May 2019	978-1-9747-0666-2
11	15 February 2019	978-4-253-27336-7	11 November 2019	978-1-9747-1013-3
12	19 August 2019	978-4-253-27337-4	9 June 2020	978-1-9747-1468-1
13	14 February 2020	978-4-253-27338-1	10 November 2020	978-1-9747-1818-4
14	16 September 2020	978-4-253-27339-8	12 October 2021	978-1-9747-2366-9
15	16 March 2021	978-4-253-27340-4	10 May 2022	978-1-9747-2523-6
16	16 December 2021	978-4-253-27341-1	15 November 2022	978-1-9747-3443-6
17	16 June 2022	978-4-253-27342-8	20 June 2023	978-1-9747-3855-7

==== Spin-offs ====
===== King of Idol =====
A spin-off manga series, King of Idol: Bara-Ō no Gakuen (キング・オブ・アイドル 薔薇王の学園; "King of Idol: The Rose King's Academy"), began serialization in the February 2021 issue of Monthly Princess on 6 January 2021. The series is written and illustrated by Kineko Abekawa. (Note: Kanno is credited as the author of the gensaku (原作), i.e., the original series that the spin-off is based on.) The series ended serialization in the October 2023 issue of Monthly Princess on 6 September 2023. Its chapters were collected into two tankōbon volumes. It portrays the Requiem of the Rose King characters as high school students training to become "idols" or entertainers.

No.	Japanese release date	Japanese ISBN
1	16 June 2022	978-4-253-27343-5
2	16 November 2023	978-4-253-27344-2

===== Bara-Ō no Sōretsu: Gaiden =====
A second spin-off manga series, Bara-Ō no Sōretsu: Gaiden (薔薇王の葬列 外伝; "Requiem of the Rose King: Side Stories"), began serialization in the April 2022 issue of Monthly Princess on 4 March 2022. The series ended serialization in the October 2023 issue published on 6 September 2023. The series is written and illustrated by Kanno, and its chapters were collected into three tankōbon volumes. The series focuses on events not covered in the main series, including stories about the characters' everyday lives and Queen Margaret's past.

No.	Japanese release date	Japanese ISBN
1	14 October 2022	978-4-253-27550-7
2	14 April 2023	978-4-253-27551-4
3	16 November 2023	978-4-253-27552-1

=== Drama CDs ===
Requiem of the Rose King has inspired three drama CDs produced by Akita Shoten in Japan. The first, based on volume three of the manga, was bundled with the February 2016 issue of Monthly Princess, released on 6 January 2016. The second, based on volumes four and five of the manga, was included with a limited edition of volume seven, released on 16 January 2017. The third, based on volumes five and six of the manga, was bundled with the March 2017 issue of Monthly Princess, released on 6 February 2017. All three drama CDs starred Mitsuki Saiga as Richard III and Daisuke Namikawa as Henry VI.

=== Anime ===
On 16 September 2020, Akita Shoten announced via their YouTube channel that Requiem of the Rose King would be adapted into an anime television series. The series is animated by J.C.Staff and directed by Kentarō Suzuki, with Hiroki Uchida writing and supervising the scripts, Tsutomu Hashizume designing the characters, and Kow Otani composing the musical score. The series was originally scheduled to premiere in October 2021, but was delayed due to production issues. It aired from 9 January to 26 June 2022, on Tokyo MX and other channels in Japan. The series aired for two consecutive cours, for a half-year continuous run. The first opening theme is "Ware, Bara ni Hitasu" (我、薔薇に淫す, "I'm Obsessed with Roses") performed by Makoto Furukawa, while the first ending theme is "Akumu" (悪夢, "Nightmare") performed by Zaq. The second opening theme is "Bara Rinbukyoku" (荊棘輪舞曲, "Rose Briar Rondo") performed by Makoto Furukawa, while the second ending theme is "Rasen" (螺旅) performed by Nowlu. Funimation licensed the series as part of their Winter 2022 simulcast lineup in the United States, Canada, United Kingdom, Ireland, Mexico, Brazil, Chile, Colombia, Peru, Australia, and New Zealand. Medialink licensed the series in Southeast Asia, South Asia, and Oceania minus Australia and New Zealand.

==== Episodes ====
No.	Title	Directed by	Storyboarded by	Original release date
1	"Wars of the Roses"	Akira Tanaka	Kentarō Suzuki	9 January 2022
Civil war grips Medieval England as the houses of York and Lancaster vie for the throne. Richard, the Duke of York's youngest son, wants nothing more than to see his father crowned king, but he struggles with a secret that he fears to confront.
2	"Father Is My Light"	Fumihiro Matsui	Kentarō Suzuki	16 January 2022
The Duke of York has seized the capital and the throne, but he must still overcome Queen Margaret's army if he hopes to be crowned king. Richard, imprisoned in the Tower of London, can only speculate about the fortunes of war.
3	"I Am the Shadow, the Darkness Behind the Light"	Kiyoto Nakajima	Kentarō Suzuki	23 January 2022
The Duke of York's death is a blow both to Richard and to the Yorkist cause, but an unforeseen setback gives the Earl of Warwick and Edward time to rally their forces. How will Richard face the coming battle and a world without the duke?
4	"I'm Afraid I'm Going to Lose the Answers I've Gotten and...Everything Else."	Daisuke Kurose	Masato Matsune	30 January 2022
Edward, now king, enlists Richard to guard the secret of his affair with Elizabeth Woodville. Alone in the woods, Richard has an unexpected encounter that raises unsettling questions.
5	"If I Don't Grab Your Hand, I Won't Have to Let Go"	Ken'ichi Nishida	Ken'ichi Nishida	6 February 2022
The Earl of Warwick seethes at his humiliation and loss of power caused by King Edward's marriage. Meanwhile, Richard's time with the earl's daughter, Anne, raises new possibilities in the young duke's mind.
6	"A man who has no awareness as king... A man who is not qualified to be king... Neither of them is fit for the throne."	Akira Tanaka	Iku Suzuki	13 February 2022
The Earl of Warwick plots rebellion, and tensions mount between George and King Edward. The king refuses to doubt his comrade or his brother, but his trust may cost him his crown.
7	"Even if I sin..."	Kai Hasako	Ryō Andō	20 February 2022
Richard and Catesby race to rescue the captive Edward, who has fallen into Warwick's hands. Meanwhile, Prince Edward is preoccupied with his position in England and his feelings for Richard.
8	"Even alone, it wasn't frightening. Rather... the loneliness has been kind ever since losing Father."	Ken'ichi Nishida, Sayaka Morikawa, Akira Tanaka	Iku Suzuki	27 February 2022
The Yorkist cause seems desperate with Warwick championing the Lancastrian cause and Henry back on the throne. Edward entrusts Richard to carry out a secret mission that could reverse their fortunes.
9	"I remember when Christmas was approaching. The time when I lost Father."	Shigeki Awai	Iku Suzuki, Ken'ichi Nishida	6 March 2022
Richard and Catesby continue their mission to win George back to the Yorkist cause. Meanwhile, Henry laments his position as Warwick raises an army to prevent Edward's return.
10	"My name is Richard Plantagenet."	Daisuke Kurose	Daisuke Kurose	13 March 2022
As Edward's and Warwick's forces finally clash, Richard races across the misty battlefield in search of King Henry, the target of his vengeance.
11	"That is my... my punishment..."	Tomio Yamauchi	Iku Suzuki	20 March 2022
Warwick is dead and his army scattered, but Edward and the Yorkist forces still have to contend with Margaret's French army. How will Richard fare in battle after an unsettling encounter with Henry?
12	"Richard is dead, died alone in the woods that day."	Akira Tanaka	Kentarō Suzuki	27 March 2022
Richard stews in inner turmoil as Edward celebrates the Yorkist victory and George jockeys for position. When the question of the captive Henry's fate is raised, Richard is forced to make an irrevocable choice.
12.5	"Part One Digest: Meetings and Partings"; Transliteration: "Dai Ichi Kūru Daijesuto～Deai to Betsuri～" (Japanese: 第1クールダイジェスト～出逢いと別離～)	Shinsei Kuramoto	N/A	3 April 2022
Memories of war fade as Edward IV celebrates his prosperous reign, but all is not well. Between the king's mysterious new mistress and George's open dissatisfaction, Richard may be force to act once more.
13	"After all, this body is just a prison of the soul..."	Ken'ichi Nishida	Kentarō Suzuki, Iku Suzuki	10 April 2022
Richard and Buckingham have successfully framed George for a sorcerous plot against King Edward and now scheme to ensure he does not leave his prison cell alive. As Edward's health fails, the conspirators grow more urgent and more ruthless
14	"Good night. Brother."	Shūji Miyazaki	Sayaka Morikawa	17 April 2022
Richard captures George for cursing Edward IV. However, Edward IV keeps hoping that George might come to his senses. Richard makes a decision: "Buckingham, kill George." Now Richard must convince Edward IV that it was the Woodville family that sent George to his death. George, cornered by Richard and Buckingham's plot, storms into the courtroom.
15	"If you hide it, you won't feel sadness."	Shigeki Awai	Iku Suzuki	24 April 2022
Richard is now taking care of Edward IV...but upon the king's death, Queen Elizabeth's brother Anthony plans to install a child prince as king and himself as regent. Anthony also attempts to arrest Richard for treason, but Buckingham also lurks behind the shadows. Finally, Buckingham learns the secret of Richard, who then reveals a dream: "If you can't escape your fate...then become the devil."
16	"The devil has the devil's way."	Kai Hasako	Kai Hasako	1 May 2022
Richard and Buckingham embark on a majority-rule maneuver to gain the throne. It creates more suffering for Catesby, who has been trying to protect Richard while serving Hastings. Who is his loyalty truly for? Meanwhile, Hastings and the Queen Mother are planning a service for King Edward V. The service would publicize and solidify Elizabeth's power if held, and now Richard is gradually pushed into a position of inferiority.
17	"Because God has chosen this bloody demon."	Daisuke Kurose	Daisuke Kurose	8 May 2022
Hastings and the Queen Mother carry out a plan to disqualify Richard...but it's revealed that Edward V, son of Edward IV and Elizabeth, had no rightful claim to the throne. So Edward V and his brother are imprisoned in the Tower of London. Thus Richard steadily closes in on the throne...but Cecily agitates the people against it, stating "the devil must not be made king!" Faced with throngs of angry citizens, Richard and Buckingham put on the play of the century.
18	"Your name."	Akira Tanaka	Iku Suzuki	15 May 2022
Anne witnesses Richard coming out of Buckingham's room at night. "You know him better than anyone", she says to Catesby. "If he's hiding something, please tell me." To root out Richard's secret, Anne proposes that he dress as a woman and she as a man at a banquet they call "The Devil's Paradise." Despite Anne's intentions, the banquet is a great success, the two of them lost among the admiring crowd. Then Buckingham appears, dressed as the devil.
19	"I will protect Edward. That child is my son."	Ken'ichi Nishida	Hiroaki Yoshikawa	22 May 2022
At a rainy villa, a night spent with Henry VI springs back to Richard's memory. Buckingham, knowing who Richard once loved, joins hands with the king. "Say the name," he tells him, "my name." The villa is visited by Tyrell, the assassin who took George and the others. Buckingham is shocked when he realizes Tyrell is the spitting image of Henry VI. Meanwhile, in London, Richmond is on the move for the throne.
20	"The light is overhead."	Takaaki Ishiyama	Takaaki Ishiyama	29 May 2022
Rumors circulate that Richard is not the rightful king. This story leads to the escape of Edward V, son of the previous king, and his brother from the Tower of London. Richard suffers from poor health as he prepares for his coronation in York. A medical examination by the imprisoned witch Jane suggests a certain possibility. With that in mind, Richard visits Buckingham's castle. There, Buckingham's love for Richard grows to the point where he takes unprecedented action. "I can no longer keep my cool with you around."
21	"It should still be in time now."	Naoki Murata	Iku Suzuki	5 June 2022
Buckingham, determined to rebel, tries to win the cooperation of Bishop Ely and Stanley. Meanwhile, Richmond advises his father-in-law Stanley of the conditions under which he will join the rebellion. Those conditions: The death of King Edward V and his brother, who are imprisoned in the Tower of London. Buckingham believes Richard III, and no one else, must commit the murders. At the same time, Richard enters York and waits for Buckingham, who is expected to come. However, after the coronation, Richard is visited by the assassin Tyrell.
22	"Use your head more, damn brat. Don't die even if you are weak."	Kai Hasako	Kai Hasako	12 June 2022
With Buckingham in open rebellion, an anguished Richard turns toward Catesby. "If only I hadn't been so intimate with him. If only I wasn't the son of the devil..." But that was no longer an option. Leaving his wife Anne and son Edward behind, Richard sets out for battle. Richard III and Buckingham cross swords in the Forest of Dean, just as they promised. "I will cross the border and abandon my name. I will stand by your side and cut through your thorns until the day I die. That...and the loyalty to your father that still binds you..."
23	"Mother...... Goodbye."	Shūji Miyazaki	Shūji Miyazaki	19 June 2022
Just as Richard has personally seen to the end of Buckingham, Anne confesses that her tuberculosis has returned. Anne begs Richard to disinherit their kind-hearted son Edward in order to protect him. Facing the cruel fate of loved ones drifting away, Richard desperate enough for the departed Buckingham to try replacing him with Catesby. But Catesby says he cannot, for "the heat of the body cannot warm the soul." In the midst of this, the battle with Richmond approaches.
24	"Requiem of the Rose King"	Akira Tanaka	Kentarō Suzuki	26 June 2022
"If this name, if this blood, was all an illusion...then what is the point of this battle?" Richard looks back at his past, guided by Tyrell in front of him. "Let us go home, even if it is a battlefield where not even sleep is allowed to us..."

=== Stage plays ===
A stage play adaptation of the manga ran at the Nippon Seinenkan hall in Tokyo from June 10 to June 19, 2022. The play was directed by Fumiya Matsuzaki, with its script written by Requiem of the Rose King anime screenplay writer Hiroki Uchida. It starred both a female actor, Yumi Wakatsuki, and a male actor, Sayato Arima, as the intersex Richard III. Additional cast members included Takuma Wada as Henry VI; Yūki Kimisawa as Edward IV of York; Gaku Takamoto as George, Duke of Clarence; Shō Katō as Catesby; Yūsuke Seto as Warwick; Ryōta Hirono as Prince Edward of Lancaster; Sena as Anne Neville; Sayaka Fujioka as Cecily Neville, Duchess of York; Ryōko Tanaka as Queen Margaret; and Masashi Taniguchi as Richard Plantagenet, Duke of York.

A separate musical adaptation is scheduled to run at the Kokumin Kyosai Co-Op Hall/Space Zero in Tokyo from April 19 to April 27, 2025. Akiko Kodama serves as the director, Ryū Hizuki as the scriptwriter, Masato Kamato as in charge of the music, and Shinji Rachi as the choreographer. The musical will star former Takarazuka Revue performer Tsukasa Hiryū as Richard III.

=== Other media ===
A bonus manga chapter, Bara-Ō Ryokō-ki (薔薇王旅行記; "The Rose King's Travel Report"), was published in the July 2015 issue of Monthly Princess on 5 June 2015. The chapter depicts Kanno's trip to England with her editor for the reburial of King Richard III in March of that year.

An art book, Bara-Ō no Sōretsu Irasuto-shū: Keikyoku no Hitsugi (「薔薇王の葬列」イラスト集 荊棘の棺; "Requiem of the Rose King Illustration Collection: Coffin of Thorns"), was published by Akita Shoten on 15 June 2018.

A spin-off novel, Bara-Ō no Sōretsu Original Novel: Itsutsu no Makuai (薔薇王の葬列 original novel 五つの幕間; "Requiem of the Rose King Original Novel: Five Interludes"), was published by Akita Shoten on 15 December 2021. The novel was written by Yō Makusu, with cover art by Kanno.

A fanbook was published by Akita Shoten on 16 March 2022, collecting character information, tribute illustrations, and manga previously omitted from the bound volume release of the main series.

== Reception ==
In the 2015 edition of Takarajimasha's Kono Manga ga Sugoi! guidebook, Requiem of the Rose King tied with Tanaka-kun is Always Listless for number 17 on the list of the top 20 manga for female readers. Japanese actor Kenji Urai, who portrayed Henry VI in a production of the Shakespearean play at the New National Theatre Tokyo, stated that he is a "big fan" of the manga. Moto Hagio, a pioneering shōjo manga artist, praised Requiem of the Rose King's depiction of "a whole new Richard III", calling it "more interesting than Shakespeare!"
