= His Majesty the Demon King's Housekeeper =

Japanese manga series

- First tankōbon volume cover

魔王陛下のお掃除係 (Maō Heika no Osōji-gakari)
- Genre: Fantasy, isekai
- Manga
- Written by: Saiko Wadori
- Illustrated by: Mika Kajiyama
- Published by: Akita Shoten
- English publisher: NA: Seven Seas Entertainment
- Imprint: Princess Comics
- Magazine: Princess
- Original run: February 6, 2019 – October 6, 2026
- Volumes: 13

His Majesty the Demon King's Housekeeper (魔王陛下のお掃除係, Maō Heika no Osōji-gakari) is a Japanese manga series written by Saiko Wadori and illustrated by Mika Kajiyama. It was serialized in Akita Shoten's shōjo manga magazine Princess from February 2019 to October 2026.

== Synopsis ==
The series focuses on Sakura Takatsuki, a high school girl who is obsessed with cleanliness. She becomes so obsessed with cleanliness that it's become a hobby for her. One day she gets kidnapped and transported to another world, and lands in an area ruled by a Demon King. Once she finds herself in that area, she is stunned by how unclean it all is. The area is under a curse from a witch that prevents the use of cleaning magic, as a result of that the demons have given up trying to clean the area. Sakura decides to take matters in her own hands and clean up the whole area.

== Publication ==
Written by Saiko Wadori and illustrated by Mika Kajiyama, His Majesty the Demon King's Housekeeper was serialized in Akita Shoten's shōjo manga magazine Princess from February 6, 2019, to October 6, 2026. Its chapters were collected into thirteen tankōbon volumes as of April 2026. The series is licensed in English by Seven Seas Entertainment.

=== Volumes ===
No.	Original release date	Original ISBN	North American release date	North American ISBN
1	July 16, 2019	978-4-253-27491-3	September 20, 2022	978-1-63858-407-0
1. "I'll Finish Cleaning... in Another World?!..."; 2. "The Saint in the Demon King's Palace..."; 3. "The Saint's Miracles Are Cherry Blossom Approved!..."; 4. "The Pitter-Pat of the Demon King's Awakening Heart..."
2	December 16, 2019	978-4-253-27492-0	December 6, 2022	978-1-63858-418-6
5. "The Human-Hating King of Cats..."; 6. "A Twenty-Four Hour Housekeeping Saint Exclusive..."; 7. "The Wolf Knight and an Unbalanced World..."; 8. "A Test of the Demon King's Purity..."
3	June 16, 2020	978-4-253-27493-7	March 21, 2023	978-1-63858-690-6
9. "The Hero in the Demon King's Palace..."; 10. "You Won't Make My Neck Tired..."; 11. "The Saint and the Witch..."; 12. "The Housekeeping Saint Comes Clean..."
4	December 16, 2020	978-4-253-27494-4	June 13, 2023	978-1-63858-829-0
13. "Disaster in the Sacred See..."; 14. "The Housekeeping Saint in the Sacred See..."; 15. "A Rendezvous with Destiny?!..."; 16. "His Only Flaw? He's a Lightweight..."; 17. "The Demon King Is Not Amused..."
5	June 16, 2021	978-4-253-27495-1	October 31, 2023	978-1-68579-612-9
18. "The Two Housekeeping Saints..."; 19. "Who's the Real Housekeeping Saint?..."; 20. "Jerica of the White Forest..."; 21. "The Sound of the Demon King's Lovestruck Heart..."; 22. "The Housekeeping Saint's Return..."
6	December 16, 2021	978-4-253-27496-8	July 23, 2024	979-8-88843-352-2
23. "Heartthrobs and Bombshells!..."; 24. "The Wolf, the Full Moon, and a Lady Knight..."; 25. "The Boy and the Wolf..."; 26. "Is the Prince of Beasts a Gentleman?..."; 27. "The Twilight of the Golden Fighters..."
7	August 16, 2022	978-4-253-27497-5	September 10, 2024	979-8-88843-659-2
28. "Sleeping Beauty?!..."; 29. "Her Majesty's Assignment..."; 30. "Is What You Seek Underwater? Or Way Up Above?..."; 31. "To the Mermaid's Palace!..."; 32. "The Sound of the Demon King's Plummeting Purity..."
8	January 16, 2023	978-4-253-27498-2	November 5, 2024	979-8-89160-181-9
33. "What's inside the Treasure Chest?..."; 34. "Blame It on the Mold..."; 35. "The Saint Dreams in the Demon King's Arms..."; 36. "His Majesty the Demon King's Instructor 1..."; 37. "His Majesty the Demon King's Instructor 2..."
9	August 16, 2023	978-4-253-27499-9	March 25, 2025	979-8-89160-908-2
38. "A Light He Cannot Be Without..."; 39. "To Cure What Ails You..."; 40. "Of Stars, Shrooms, and Saints..."; 41. "It Must Have Been Something You Ate..."; 42. "A Proper Otherworldly Projection..."; 43. "Praise Be to Our Beauteous Demon King..."
10	February 16, 2024	978-4-253-27500-2	July 29, 2025	979-8-89373-006-7
44. "The Rusted City..."; 45. "Sorrows at the Witch's Coming..."; 46. "'Twas a Foul, Ugly Beast..."; 47. "The Suspect Saint..."; 48. "Comrades in White..."
11	November 15, 2024	978-4-253-27508-8	December 23, 2025	979-8-89561-089-3
49. "When the Demon King's Pure Heart Is Cornered..."; 50. "A Sound to Move His Heart..."; 51. "The Chosen Child 1..."; 52. "The Chosen Child 2..."; 53. "The Chosen Child 3..."
12	May 15, 2025	978-4-253-27509-5	March 31, 2026	979-8-89765-136-8
54. "The Chosen Child 4..."; 55. "The Kindly King's Price 1..."; 56. "The Kindly King's Price 2..."; 57. "The Kindly King's Price 3..."; 58. "On the Honor of the Housekeeping Saint 1..."
13	April 16, 2026	978-4-253-01287-4	December 22, 2026	979-8-89863-188-8

== Reception ==
In a review for Da Vinci Web, Shun Itono and Negoto described the highlight of the series being the main character's cleaning skills, calling it "refreshing" how other characters approve of her skills. They also recommended the series for fans of isekai and for people who want to feel positive while cleaning.
