= A, A Prime =

Japanese manga anthology

- Cover of A, A Prime as published by Viz Media
- Genre: Science fiction, romance
- Manga
- Written by: Moto Hagio
- Published by: Akita Shoten; Shogakukan
- English publisher: NA: Viz Media
- Magazine: Princess; Petit Flower
- English magazine: NA: Manga Vizion
- Published: November 20, 1984
- Volumes: 1

A, A Prime is a Japanese manga anthology of short stories written and illustrated by Moto Hagio. Originally spelled A, A′, it was first published in November 1984 by Shogakukan and brings together three science fiction stories published between 1981 and 1984. In addition to the titular short story which appeared in Akita Shoten's Princess, the anthology includes "4/4 [Quatre-Quarts]" and "X+Y"—both of which were serialized in the Shogakukan magazine Petit Flower. English translations of the stories, which first appeared separately in Viz Media's Manga Vizion from 1995 to 1996, were collected by the publisher in 1997.

The anthology deals with gender, with the androgyny and ambiguity typical of Hagio's characters, as well as identity and memory. Gender and sexuality are explored most prominently in "X+Y", which features a young man who learns that he is intersex, gender fluidity and transition, and a gay relationship. The story won the 1985 Seiun Best Comic Award, and its English-language version was praised for its artwork and emotion. It is also regarded as having introduced gender-bending to the shōjo manga genre.

== Plot ==
Set in a shared futuristic universe, the stories' common thread is a genetically engineered "Unicorn" species created for space travel. Extremely intelligent, with a humanoid appearance, they have difficulty understanding other people and their own emotions.

=== "A, A Prime" ===
A research group is attempting to terraform the planet Munzel. Since the mission is dangerous, each member of the group was cloned before departure. The plot revolves around the arrival of the clone of the Unicorn, Adelade Lee. Adelade's clone, with no memory of the three years Adelade lived on Munzel, disturbs Regg Bone, who had a romantic relationship with Adelade. Although he knows she is a clone, the resemblance attracts him and he kisses her to a dispassionate reaction. When Adelade's clone explores the planet Munzel with Regg, they find Adelade's body frozen in a cave. Regg soon asks to be transferred to Space Colony A on the planet Torimann. When Colony A is destroyed in an explosion and Regg dies, Adelade's clone is emotionally shaken; Regg is replaced by his clone, and Adelade's clone weeps when she remembers their kiss.

=== "4/4" ===
On Jupiter's moon Io, Mori, a man with telekinetic powers he cannot control, is training with Professor Mia. After he saves a Unicorn descendant named Trill from a free fall, he frequently visits her in the home of Professor Sazzan, the man who adopted her. When Mori discovers that Sazzan is only interested in his telekinetic powers, he runs away with Trill. Mori kisses Trill, but when she says she loves him and Sazzan equally he overheats and burns Mia's aviary. Mia sends Mori to Mars; Trill's repressed feelings are released, and she expresses her hatred for Sazzan and his experiments. When Sazzan tries to assault Trill she breaks a vase on his head and runs to an airlock, where she falls to her death in front of Mori, who is aboard a ship leaving for Mars.

=== "X+Y" ===
Unicorn Tacto's mother, Marble, committed suicide in his presence when he was seven. His father, Doctor Moonsault, had developed a sex-change drug with an intended temporary effect; however, when Marble took it she remained a woman for three years. Moonsault and Marble married and one month after Tacto's birth, Marble became a man. Marble wanted to be a woman, but he was resistant to the medicine. This, and Moonsault seeing other women, led Marble to commit suicide. Moonsault erased Tacto's memory before leaving on a space mission; Tacto was raised by Doctor George, who brings him to the Allergy Culture Center. Tacto becomes one of its "brains" who develop the Tako Project, Earth's entry in a contest to raise Mars' atmospheric pressure.

On Mars, Tacto meets Mori (from "4/4"). Mori, stunned at the resemblance between Tacto and Trill, falls in love with him. Tacto does not feel the same way and is engaged to Merimé, the cousin of Tako Project member Zazz. This angers Mori, and after their talk, Tacto loses all memory of him. The project requires bringing water from Jupiter, and the group goes to nearby planet Mimas. To regain Tacto's affection, Mori invites him on a scooter tour across Jupiter's rings and they have an accident. Mori, seriously injured, wakes up in an emergency room and goes to search for Tacto who has been missing for 16 hours. He rescues Tacto, they bond emotionally, and Tacto breaks his engagement to Merimé. Moonsault arrives at the request of George's wife, An-An, to help Tacto (who is genetically a woman) decide whether to use female hormones. The doctor explains that Tacto changed his sex frequently, and says that the decision is Tacto's—who remains a man. When his father reveals what happened to Marble, he regains the ability to understand his feelings and knows that he loves Mori.

== Publication ==
A, A Prime, as published in Japanese and English, is a collection of three science fiction short stories: the titular story, "4/4 [Quatre-Quarts]" (Japanese: 4/4カトルカース, Hepburn: Katoru Kāsu) and "X+Y". "A, A Prime" was published in Princess, an Akita Shoten magazine, in August 1981. "4/4" and "X+Y" were published in Shogakukan's Petit Flower—the former in November 1983, and the latter in two parts in July and August 1984. The stories were first compiled and published on November 20, 1984, as the last installment of a Shogakukan series of Moto Hagio's complete works. A tankōbon containing the three stories was republished three times by Shogakukan: on August 30, 1995, as part of the SF Masterpiece Collection, on August 9, 2003, in bunkoban format and on August 25, 2014, in EPUB format.

The English version of the stories appeared in the Viz Media magazine Manga Vizion: "A, A Prime" in April and May 1995, "4/4" in July and August and "X+Y" in four installments from October 1995 to January 1996. Viz Media published the anthology as a graphic novel in October 1997.

== Themes and analysis ==
Shoujo, as a tradition, is defined by this contrast against a prevailing and dominant masculine culture. Its female-ness is incalculable and omnipresent. Rather than taking comfort in the knowledge that this difference exists, Hagio uses her narratives to question its very foundation, specifically, gender. By undermining the reader's sense of gender and applying scrutiny to the interpretive structures related to it, she is calling into question the very conventions that define the work that they are reading.

— Rob Vollmar, The Comics Journal

According to the back cover of the Viz Media edition, the Unicorn's "personal struggles" are a metaphor for human alienation in contemporary society. However, anthropologist Rachel Thorn commented the Unicorns are the "eccentrics", a common feature in Hagio's works. Usually, wrote Thorn, Hagio's stories center "on a remarkable and strange character who [...] seems incapable of so-called 'normal' human interaction" until a "straight man", "unsure of his place in the world, and just trying to muddle through [...] forms a unique bond with the 'eccentric.'" In A, A Prime, Regg Bone and Mori are those straight men.

Although the cover says that "X+Y" discusses gender and sexual identity, Michell Smith of Pop Culture Shock wrote that all three stories explore "themes of gender and identity". Former Viz editor Shaenon K. Garrity said that it "is really about identity in all its forms: sexual identity, gender identity, cloning, lost memories, blocked emotions", and emotional isolation. Manga Bookshelf's Katherine Dacey wrote: "One of [its] most striking themes is the relationship between memory and identity", demonstrated by "A, A Prime" and the character of Tacto.

In the Comics Journal, Rob Vollmar wrote that Hagio gives "4/4" and "X+Y" a shōnen-ai beat and explores gender ambiguity; in "4/4" Mori is depicted as hyper-emotional, and Trill (a woman) has no feelings. Vollmar also highlighted the androgyny of "A, A Prime"'s main characters, noting that Mori and Trill are even more androgynous. In "X+Y", "[The] muted sense of gender identity that is kept to the sub-textual level in '4/4' is transformed into the central conceit ... Hagio effectively scrambles gender awareness until little is left by which to prejudge the dynamic growth of the characters but the result. The resolution of the conflict, then, lies not in whether Mori will overcome his heterosexuality to recognize his biological resonance with the presumably male Tacto, but whether Tacto can remember and thus overcome his childhood experiences in order to accept love from anyone." According to Vollmar, the problems raised by Hagio are not only romantic but "thorny moral and ethical questions". Vollmar wrote that Hagio questions the dichotomy between shōjo and shōnen in her treatment of gender.

== Reception and legacy ==
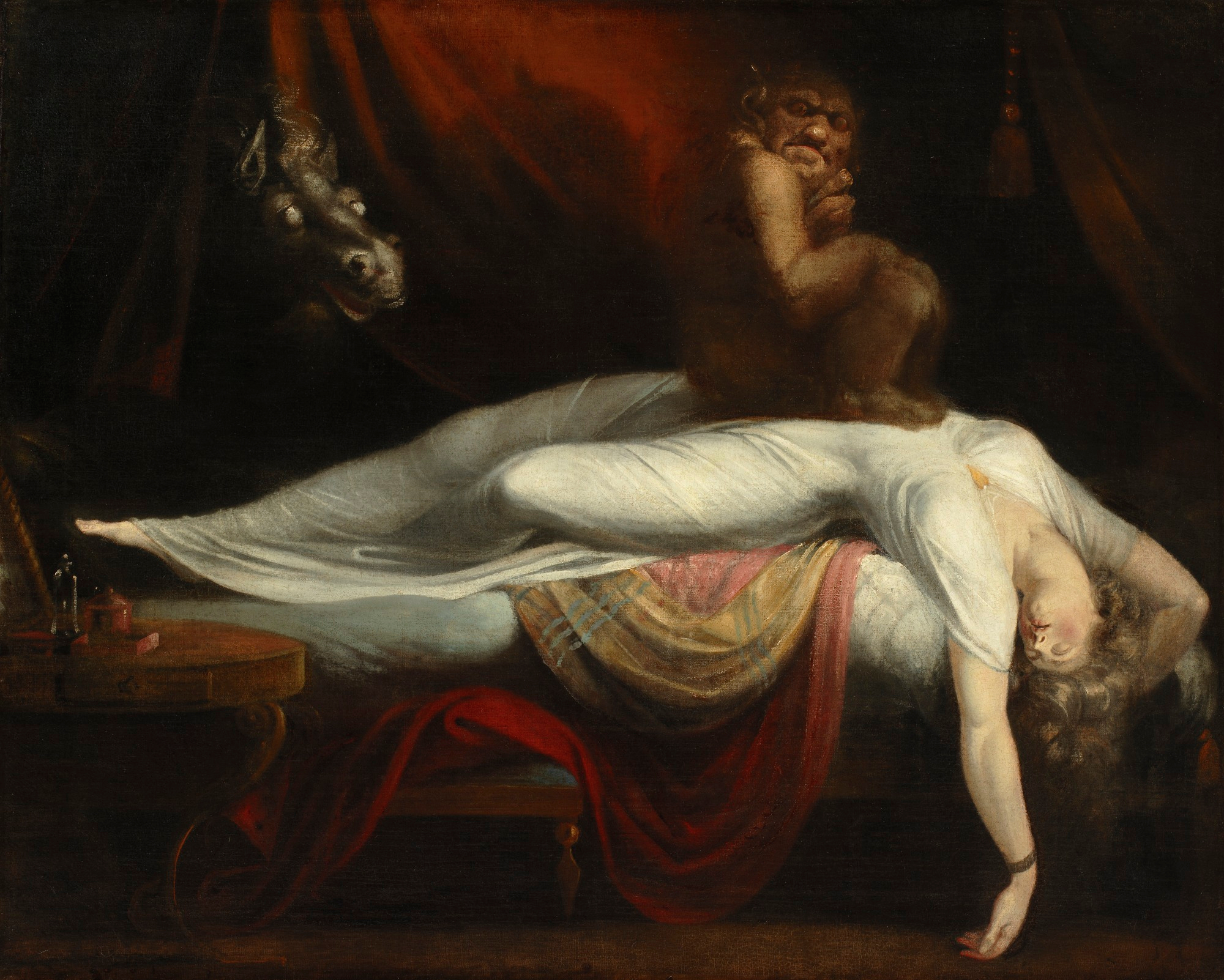
Katherine Dacey said that Hagio represented the characters' memories in "symbolically rich imagery", comparing Tacto's unformed memory of his childhood to John Henry Fuseli's The Nightmare.

Although "X+Y" was well received by Japanese critics (winning the 1985 Seiun Award for Best Comic), Michelle Smith called it the weakest of the three stories. According to Smith, Mori and Tacto's relationship is "far too rushed" and Mori's rationale for being in love was unclear. She criticized Mori's causing the accident, and wrote that the subplot about Tacto's chromosomes "[doesn't] make much sense". Smith praised the other two stories and the collection's artistic style, saying that it "doesn't look like anything else". She wrote that the title story alone made A, A Prime worth reading, praising its ending and saying that she would like to see another story with its characters. "4/4" was second best in Smith's opinion, and she enjoyed the portrayal of Trill's lack of emotional involvement. Steve Whitaker, for The Slings & Arrows Comic Guide, called A, A Prime "a masterful example of science fiction in a shojo", praising its art: "Facials and montages are carefully played-off against the portrayal of the various planets and their communities".

Describing the anthology as a "flawless jewel of science fiction", Shaenon K. Garrity called it an emotional work which touched her deeply: "Because of A, A Prime, I discovered that this art form could do more than I'd imagined—not just tell ambitious stories, which I already knew from reading Sandman and Bone and Watchmen, but tell them with passion, in lines drawn from nerve endings, using every weapon in the artist's arsenal to not just dazzle the mind, but stab straight to the heart." Katherine Dacey also praised the "intensely Romantic quality of all three stories" and their artwork, particularly Hagio's representation of the characters' memories and emotional states with "symbolically rich imagery" and a "dream-like quality". Dacey cited Hagio's "unique ability to mix the sublime with the ridiculous", such as the characters' names and costumes and the sex-change drug.

According to Rob Vollmar, A, A Prime is an important part of "the evolution of shoujo out of shonen manga". It was cited by Garrity as "one of the forerunners to countless modern manga with inventive gender-bending elements", such as Rumiko Takahashi's Ranma ½. Another Takahashi work, Urusei Yatsura, has a storyline in which clones are differentiated from the originals by apostrophes on their heads, referring to "A, A Prime"'s title.
