= Lady Victorian =

Japanese manga series by Naoko Moto

- Bluebell Everrose (right), Argent Gray (left), and Argent as Lady Ethel (middle).

レディー・ヴィクトリアン (Redī Vikutorian)
- Genre: Historical romance
- Manga
- Written by: Naoko Moto
- Published by: Akita Shoten
- Imprint: Princess Comics
- Magazine: Princess
- Original run: 1998 – January 6, 2007
- Volumes: 20

Lady Victorian (Japanese: レディー・ヴィクトリアン, Hepburn: Redī Vikutorian) is a Japanese manga series written and illustrated by Naoko Moto. It was serialized in Princess magazine from 1998 to January 2007 and published as 20 tankōbon volumes by Akita Shoten. Set during the Victorian era, the story follows the adventures of Bluebell Lily Everrose, nicknamed Bell, a young girl who travels to London to find a job as a governess.

== Synopsis ==
When Bell comes to London, she hopes for a bright future. But fate plays a trick on her. While she is working for an unpleasant family, a dead body is found in her bag and she is arrested. Fortunately, she is rescued by the kind Mr. Noel Scott and Lady Ethel, whom she discovers later to be a man. After the incident, she comes across numerous events, which are either hilarious, dramatic, or romantic.

== Characters ==
Bluebell Lily Everrose (ブルーベル・リリー・エヴァローズ)
Also known as Bell, she is from a rural area of England. Her father was a missionary. After he died, she travels to London to seek a job as a governess. She is lively, optimistic, and romantic.
Lady Ethel Constantia (レディー・エセル・コンスタンシア) / Argent Gray (アージェント・グレイ)
When a marquis's daughter was about to die, the marquis thought of her wife who would be heartbroken and died if she knew this. He tried not to let her know this. He found an orphan boy Argent in East End, trained the young boy as a lady and replaced their daughter with him. With grace and beauty, Argent becomes the society's top lady. But he has another facet. Every now and then, he dresses as a man and goes by the name Argent Gray, which is also his pen name as a novelist for Noel's magazine. When he is in this mode, he acts as an uncouth man who grew up in a slum. That does not hide his exceptional beauty, however, since he has long, noticeable silver hair and a pretty face.
Noel Scott (ノエル・スコット)
He runs a publishing house and a magazine for ladies. He tried to propose to Bell but he got rejected.
Lord Martin (マーティン卿)
Heir of the marquis. Lady Ethel's elder brother. After three years of studying outside of the country, Lord Martin came back to London. He first encountered Bell while she and her student went on a walk. Bell accidentally stomped on him.
Marquis of Leicesterberry (レスターベリー侯爵)
Father of Lady Ethel and Lord Martin. He found Argent and made him Lady Ethel. But he is also thinking how the situation concludes. He supports that Argent grows his talent as a novelist.
Silverthief (シルヴァーシーフ)
Mysterious person. He tries to thieve silver accessories or silver related things, thus tries to kidnap Lady Ethel because Ethel is called "Silver Lady". He is a member of some royal family, therefore a certain nobleman calls him "Your Highness".

== Publication and story nodes ==
Lady Victorian was published for 20 volume tankōbon in Princess comics. The manga work contains several story motives or nodes. The motives are:

1. The future of Bluebell Everrose. What ending will be brought to her career as a governess.
2. In addition, does Bluebell marry. With whom does she marry, if she marries.
3. The future of Argent Gray. He surely cannot continue to be Lady Ethel. How does this situation conclude.
4. Does Argent continue to be a novelist.
5. Why was he an orphan, if he wasn't abandoned by his parents. And then, who are his real parents.
6. Where will the tale which Bluebell's father told to Argent in a workhouse reach to. (Her father taught him the magic spell "Blue bell, lily, ever rose". Argent is aware that the spell is his daughter's name, after he tells his young days in a workhouse to Bluebell.)
7. The future of Noel Scott and his publishing house.

The manga story goes on through various episodes and human relations, along with these story nodes and questions, till the last, 20th volume.

=== Publication ===
Volume	Label	Date of Publ.	ISBN	Chapter	Ref.
Lady Victorian Volume 1	Princess comics	1999-01-20	ISBN 4-253-07737-4	Ch.1 - Ch.3	
Lady Victorian Volume 2	Princess comics	1999-10-15	ISBN 4-253-07738-2	Ch.4 - Ch.7	
Lady Victorian Volume 3	Princess comics	2000-07-25	ISBN 4-253-07739-0	Ch.8 - Ch. 11	
Lady Victorian Volume 4	Princess comics	2000-12-15	ISBN 4-253-19077-4	Ch.12 - Ch.16	
Lady Victorian Volume 5	Princess comics	2001-06-10	ISBN 4-253-19078-2	-	
Lady Victorian Volume 6	Princess comics	2001-11-05	ISBN 4-253-19079-0	-	
Lady Victorian Volume 7	Princess comics	2002-04-20	ISBN 4-253-19080-4	-	
Lady Victorian Volume 8	Princess comics	2002-09-20	ISBN 4-253-19134-7	-	
Lady Victorian Volume 9	Princess comics	2003-01-10	ISBN 4-253-19135-5	-	
Lady Victorian Volume 10	Princess comics	2003-06-30	ISBN 4-253-19136-3	-	
Lady Victorian Volume 11	Princess comics	2003-11-01	ISBN 4-253-19137-1	-	
Lady Victorian Volume 12	Princess comics	2004-03-20	ISBN 4-253-19138-X	-	
Lady Victorian Volume 13	Princess comics	2004-07-25	ISBN 4-253-19139-8	-	
Lady Victorian Volume 14	Princess comics	2004-12-20	ISBN 4-253-19140-1	-	
Lady Victorian Volume 15	Princess comics	2005-04-15	ISBN 4-253-19475-3	-	
Lady Victorian Volume 16	Princess comics	2005-09-15	ISBN 4-253-19476-1	Ch.68 - Ch.72	
Lady Victorian Volume 17	Princess comics	2006-01-15	ISBN 4-253-19477-X	Ch.73 - Ch.76	
Lady Victorian Volume 18	Princess comics	2006-06-15	ISBN 4-253-19478-8	Ch.77 - Ch.81	
Lady Victorian Volume 19	Princess comics	2006-11-15	ISBN 4-253-19479-6	Ch.82 - Ch.86	
Lady Victorian Volume 20	Princess comics	2007-04-15	ISBN 978-4253194808	Ch.87 - Ch.91	

=== Synopsis for each volume ===
- Introductory information

It is 1878. The late middle of the Victorian era. Queen Victoria is 59. Charles Dickens has died 8 years ago. Prime minister is Lord Beaconsfield.
A small 16 years girl arrives at London, Bluebell Lily Everrose, who comes from Winch village at rural area in England (Gloucestershire), having a hope and dream to live an independent lady woman like "Governess Laura" which is the story published in the "Lady's magazine", and is written by Argent Gray who seems to be a new face novelist. Bell's father was a clergyman of the village Winch who sometimes visited to London. (He has died at this point).

- Volume 1

Chapter 1: Victorian Bell: Bluebell gets a job as a governess, but is not pleasant one like other governesses. (Status of governess was very low in this age). She happens to visit Hyde Park, where she meets with "Silver Lady" - Lady Ethel Constantia. But from her basket, a murdered body is found and Bluebell is sent to prison. Noel Scott suddenly visits at her solitary cell in the Newgate prison, whom Bell knows as an editor of the Lady's magazine. Bell introduces herself and asks about Argent. Lady Ethel is confident of not guilty of Bell. By the efforts of Ethel and Scott, Bell's suspicion is cleared. Visiting Noel's office at Fleet Street to thank, Bell finds Lady Ethel is a man, Argent.
Chapter 2: Lady & Gentleman?: To Bell's surprise, that graceful Silver Lady changes to a casual man from the slums. Why is Argent a cross-dressed lady. Argent shortly explains the reason why he is a daughter of the marquis. Bell loses her job. Tender Argent offers to give her lady's education. Visiting the mansion of Marquis of Leicesterberry, Bell meets the marquis and his wife, and learns lady's manners etc. from Argent (Lady Ethel). At that time, Lady Ethel is invited to the Warwick Castle. They hear the rumor of Silver-thief who robs silver accessories. With Bell and Noel (as a maid and a servant), Ethel visits the Warwick and is about to be kidnapped by Silver-thief. Bluebell helps him (when being a lady, Argent is totally a woman who cannot resist).
Chapter 3: My Fair Lady!: As a result of visiting the Warwick Castle, Bell can find a new job. She becomes a governess of Polly who is a daughter of Baroness Clove. But Polly is a sleepwalker due to loneliness. Argent talks the tale to reassure Polly. Bell gets aware it is her father's tale. Argent tells that a certain clergyman taught him that tale and the magic spell "Blue bell, lily, ever rose" in a workhouse. Polly is recovered. And now Bell and Argent a bit know each other. On the other hand, Noel's propose is rejected by Bell.

- Volume 2

Chapter 4: A Girl Meets A Boy?: Bell now lives in the rural place in the Kent, where the villa of Polly's father is. Bell goes to London, and meets with Noel and Argent. Lady Ethel (Argent) asks Bell to go with her to the Whiteley department store for shopping. Ethel buys expensive accessories to decorate herself. She says it is for her special one. For whom? Bell's mind is filled with questions, and she goes a walk with Polly, teaching French, in Kent. While speaking "Il fait beau. Je me sens bien. etc.", Bell steps on someone lying in the grass. He is a young nobleman, Lord Martin. Bell very apologizes, but thinks who he is. She hears the rumor from the Baroness that Silver Lady is engaged!
Chapter 5: Sterling Silver: In Kent, Bell is asked to hand the Birthday Party invitation to Lady Ethel by Madame Sarah who is a grandmother of Polly. At London, Bell first goes to Fleet Street, and asks Noel whether the rumor is true or not. They go to the slums where Argent helps charity work. Some peoples say Ethel is really "Silver Lady", being full of grace and compassion. Argent talks the tale of Bell's father to children. Bell hands the invitation. Ethel says she hasn't yet finished lady's education to Bell. "Fortunately, there is a good partner for dance lesson". Who is him. Marquis? "No. My brother". It is Lord Martin.

== Reception ==
Ariko Kawabata mentions Moto that she is the artist who has been publishing the manga works set in Victorian era. Kawabata and Murakami talks "dark-side" Victorian manga (Black Butler is the typical dark-side Victorian manga). But there are also light-side manga for common girls. Moto Naoko is this type of manga artist, known for the various works, but which are historical stories in England. And Lady Voctorian is the representative work of Moto. This works is mentioned or analyzed by several peoples for its features.
