= The Knockout Makers =

Japanese manga series by Kyoko Hashimoto

- Cover of the first volume of The Knockout Makers

ザ・ノックアウト・マイカーズ
- Manga
- Written by: Kyoko Hashimoto
- Published by: Akita Shoten
- English publisher: NA: Tokyopop; (expired)
- Imprint: Princess Comics
- Magazine: Princess
- Original run: December 6, 2003 – May 2, 2005
- Volumes: 3

The Knockout Makers (Japanese: ザ・ノックアウト・マイカーズ) is a Japanese shōjo manga series written and illustrated by Kyoko Hashimoto (橋本 教子, Hashimoto Kyōko). It was serialized in Akita Shoten's Princess magazine from December 6, 2003, to May 2, 2005, with its chapters collected into three tankōbon volumes published under the Princess Comics imprint. The series was licensed in English by Tokyopop, which published all three volumes in 2008; it went out-of-print when the company shut down its North American publishing division in 2011.

== Reception ==
"The Knockout Makers is a shojo that, like Keiko Suenobu's Life, needs to be in teen readers' hands." — Leroy Douresseaux, Comic Book Bin. "If you are looking for a fun read, Knockout Makers should be on your list." — Ron Quezon, Mania. "At least the pretty boys distracted me from a setup that, at times, runs the risk of repetition–ugly girl needs help, makeover guys to the rescue, ugly girl becomes pretty girl, rinse, repeat." — Sheridan Scott, Newtype USA. "While the artwork in this book is fairly straightforward shojo stuff, it's the little touches like this that give it a bit of an edge over other books on the shelf." — A. E. Sparrow, IGN. "What appealed to me most is that she really does try to make over the girls without changing too much of them to be believable." — Snow Wildsmith, Teenreads.com.
