= Rosen Blood =

Japanese manga series

- First tankōbon volume cover

Rosen Blood ～背徳の冥館～ (Rōzen Buraddo Haitoku no Meikan)
- Genre: Dark fantasy; Romance; Supernatural
- Manga
- Written by: Kachiru Ishizue
- Published by: Akita Shoten
- English publisher: NA: Viz Media
- Imprint: Princess Comics
- Magazine: Monthly Princess
- Original run: September 6, 2017 – July 6, 2022
- Volumes: 5

Rosen Blood (Japanese: Rosen Blood ～背徳の冥館～, Hepburn: Rōzen Buraddo Haitoku no Meikan) is a Japanese manga series written and illustrated by Kachiru Ishizue. It was serialized in Akita Shoten's shōjo manga magazine Monthly Princess from September 2017 to July 2022, with its chapters collected in five tankōbon volumes. The manga has been licensed for English released in North America by Viz Media.

== Plot ==
Stella Violetta was passing through a forest on her way to start a new job as a maid when she experiences a carriage accident. She awakens in a strange Gothic mansion occupied by four men: Levi-Ruin, Friedrich, Yoel, and Gilbert. They hire her to be their live-in maid and do not let her leave the grounds. After working there for a while, she soon discovers the four men are vampires who feed on young women to survive.

== Publication ==
Written and illustrated by Kachiru Ishizue, Rosen Blood was serialized in Akita Shoten's shōjo manga magazine Monthly Princess from September 6, 2017, to July 6, 2022. Akita Shoten collected its chapters in five tankōbon volumes, released from July 13, 2018, to September 14, 2022.

In February 2021, Viz Media announced their license to the manga.

=== Volume list ===
No.	Original release date	Original ISBN	English release date	English ISBN
1	July 13, 2018	978-4-253-27305-3	December 7, 2021	978-1-9747-2594-6
2	August 19, 2019	978-4-253-27306-0	March 1, 2022	978-1-9747-2599-1
3	October 16, 2020	978-4-253-27307-7	June 14, 2022	978-1-9747-2600-4
4	August 16, 2021	978-4-253-27308-4	September 13, 2022	978-1-9747-2945-6
5	September 14, 2022	978-4-253-27309-1	October 10, 2023	978-1-9747-2946-3
