= Her Majesty's Dog =

Japanese manga series by Mick Takeuchi

女王様の犬 (Joō-sama no Inu)
- Genre: Comedy, romance, supernatural
- Manga
- Written by: Mick Takeuchi
- Published by: Akita Shoten
- English publisher: NA: Go! Comi; (expired)
- Imprint: Princess Comics
- Magazine: Princess (2000–2002); Princess Gold (2002–2006)
- Original run: 2000 – 2006
- Volumes: 11 (46 Chapters)

Her Majesty's Dog (Japanese: 女王様の犬, Hepburn: Joō-sama no Inu) is a Japanese manga series written and illustrated by Mick Takeuchi. It was serialized in Akita Shoten's Princess and Princess Gold magazines from 2000 to 2006, with its chapters collected into 11 tankōbon volumes published under the Princess Comics imprint. The series was licensed in North America by Go! Comi in 2005; all 11 volumes were published in English before the imprint shut down in 2010.

== Plot ==
Amane Kamori lives in a rural village, isolated from modern society. She is a powerful medium, able to control living creatures and things through the use of its real name. Her main companion is Hyoue, her guardian demon dog, who she powers up through kissing. Forbidden from revealing her identity, she and Hyoue are allowed to move to Tokyo. Together they work to help both the living and the dead deal with various troubles, while also adjusting to high school society. Amane must deal with jealousy from classmates, who don't understand why the handsome Hyoue is so devoted to her, as well as with her own family attempting to force her to come home. The family even attempts to break her bond with Hyoue. Meanwhile, Hyoue devotes himself to his master, while struggling to hide the forbidden feelings he has for her.

== Characters ==
Amane Kamori (神守 天音, Kamori Amane)
A teenage girl who is known to be a bit bubble-headed due to her sheltered life. Orphaned after the death of her father and mother, she met Hyoue during the demon hunt, lost and crying. He could be considered her best friend, as he is loyal (like a dog) and her constant companion. She lives with her uncle in Tokyo who looks just like her deceased father and was banned from the island before her birth. Aside from her uncle, she also receives help from her cousin, Hayato Hiraka, who is later revealed to be her fiancé (family arranged marriage). As the only child from the head of the family and a powerful "Manatsukai," she must return to the village and become its leader. Due to her family duties and the overbearing council of elders that tell her what she must do, she is known for hiding her true feelings, often trying to be what everyone wants her to be and putting others before herself. The only time she is noted for speaking up for herself was when she asked for permission to leave the island and move to Tokyo for school. Very optimistic, she attracts people to her once they get past her lack of social graces.
Hyoue Inugami (犬上 兵衛, Inugami Hyoue)
Amane's koma-oni, or demon guardian, he is considered one of the most powerful of his kind on the island. After the death of his former master, Hyoue (in his natural state as a fiery lion/dog) ran wild, unwilling to be controlled by another for over 100 years. It wasn't until he saw the crying young Amane that he became "domesticated" once again. Known as a glutton and a bit of a pervert, he taught Amane to feed him through the lips - thus the kissing as seen by their classmates all the time. In his human form, he is known to be extremely handsome with a punk edge to him. Brash and a bit simple, he totally loyal to Amane, as he has developed feelings of love for her. Knowing that this is unacceptable, he often tries to hide his feelings from the unsuspecting Amane - although everyone else can tell.
Takako Nishina (仁科 貴子, Nishina Takako)
Amane's first friend. Takako is one of Amane's classmate who deals with the guilt of a former classmate's suicide due to bullying. Feeling like she should have tried harder to be a friend to the outcast, she created an evil spirit of guilt that nearly killed her. Amane and Hyoue sense the evil spirit, saving Takako from its clutches, and winning a new, devoted friend. Happy to have a second chance to befriend another outcast, Takako (nicknamed Ateko) often journeys with Amane and Hyoue on their adventures, even going to their home island to make sure her friends are okay. She often sticks her nose in places where they don't belong, but always at the sake of making sure everyone is okay. Since she is a normal teenage, she often doesn't understand the issues with Amane and her family or why Amane and Hyoue cannot be together. The modern day voice of reason, she speaks up when she feels things have gotten off track.
Aoi Mitsumine (三嶺 蒼, Mitsumine Aoi)
An egotistical actor and another classmate of Ateko, Amane, and Hyoue, he is the king of lying. When Amane's desire to help him leads to her powers and Hyoue's identity being exposed, he uses this to make Amane a slave of sorts. Deep down, though, he is searching for redemption himself, as it is all an act. He becomes friends with the trio, against the wishes of Hyoue. Seen as a rival for Amane's affection, he does what Hyoue cannot - confess that he loves her. A very straightforward, if not always truthful, friend, he's popularity and stardom are often used to distract crowds so that Amane and Hyoue can investigate and defeat evil spirits. Often, he can come up with ingenuous plans himself. A good judge of character, he sees what some of the others don't when it comes to relationships and tangled threads...
Hayato Hiraka (平鹿 勇人, Hiraka Hayato)
Amane's cousin and Classical Japanese teacher at her school. He's a master strategist, as well as swordsman and Manatsukai. Serious and totally business-minded, he is quite overprotective of Amane while balancing her wishes and the wishes of the family's council of elders. Part of his overbearing directly clashes with Hyoue who hates his meddling and constant referrals to Hyoue being nothing more than a "guard dog" or "mutt" that should know his place. Hayato knows how to push all off Hyoue's buttons and regards Hyoue as too familiar with his master. He is willing to be Amane's fiancé, as he wants to be able to protect her from the family, believing that once she is in her position as leader, he will be able to dissolve the council and keep them from hurting her.
Toui Kamori (神守 冬威, Kamori Toui)
Amane's uncle. He manages an international information company. Seemingly he takes rules lightly, but in reality he's been manipulating estranged members of the Kamori family.
Zakuro
Hyoue's old partner, and the strongest koma-oni. He looks just like a girl and is often mistaken for one. He deserted the Kamori family.
Tsubute
The koma-oni employed by Hayato. She is a shawdow bird and in her human form, she appears as a young girl. She is always confrontational with Hyoue over anything.
Gion
The koma-oni employed by Toui. Her specialty is intelligence and spying not combat.

== Release ==
Her Majesty's Dog launched in the shōjo (girls') manga magazine Princess in 2000; it was initially released quarterly, and was a part-time project for author Mick Takeuchi, but as the series grew in popularity, it switched to a monthly schedule. The series transferred to Princess's sister magazine Princess Gold in August 2002, concluding in 2006.

In Japan, Akita Shoten collected the chapters into 11 tankōbon volumes published under the Princess Comics imprint from October 2001 to May 2006. In North America, Go! Comi licensed the series in English as one of its first four manga acquisitions; they published all 11 volumes from October 2005 to December 2008. The series went out-of-print when Go! Comi shut down in 2010.

== Reception ==
Her Majesty's Dog had received positive reviews by readers for its character design and storytelling. It is generally considered a "fun comic" to read. It's average rating on the MyAnimeList website is 7.67/10.
