= Shinobi Life =

Japanese manga series by Shoko Conami

- Cover of the first volume of Shinobi Life, published by Tokyopop on November 11, 2008

シノビライフ (Shinobi Raifu)
- Genre: Adventure, comedy, romance
- Manga
- Written by: Shoko Conami
- Published by: Akita Shoten
- English publisher: NA: Tokyopop (expired) Akita Shoten (digital)
- Imprint: Princess Comics
- Magazine: Princess
- Original run: July 6, 2006 – March 6, 2012
- Volumes: 13

Shinobi Life (Japanese: シノビライフ, Hepburn: Shinobi Raifu) is a Japanese romantic comedy manga series written and illustrated by Shoko Conami. It was serialized in Princess magazine from July 2006 to March 2012. The individual chapters were collected and published in thirteen tankōbon volumes by Akita Shoten. The manga was licensed for an English-language release by Tokyopop, which published seven volumes before shutting down in 2011. Akita Shoten completed the English translation and published the entire series digitally from 2018 to 2019.

== Characters ==
- Kagetora (景虎, Kagetora) is a ninja and the bodyguard of Princess Beni (Red Princess). He went to the future when a bomb exploded beneath his feet and he fell into the lake with the Red Princess because of pursuers, at the beginning of the manga. There, he meets a girl who shares the same name and face of the princess he had sworn to protect. Time and time again, he proves his loyalty to the highschool girl, who has no idea why he's protecting her with such loyalty. He refused to hurt Takezaki (Beni's father's secretary), who had supposedly kidnapped Beni, only because Beni told him that she did not want to see Kagetora kill anyone. Kagetora's self-restraint shows when he is tasered by Takezaki but still does not fight back until allowed by Beni. While on a roof with Beni, where they had first met, Beni trips and falls off, he jumps over, and the next thing they know, they're back in the past. He eventually realizes that he time-warped into the time of the princess's descendant, who looks very similar to her, and that he must love and protect Beni Fujiwara.
- Beni Fujiwara (藤原 紅, Fujiwara Beni) is a high school girl who is a distant descendant of the Red Princess. Due to her rich family background, she gets kidnapped often. Throughout the story she mentions to Kagetora that she just wishes to die in a way that would be her father's fault—disturbing Kagetora quite a bit. Although she feels that Kagetora's loyalty is rather eccentric, she eventually falls in love with Kagetora, as he does with her. Later on, Kagetora discovers that she is not the princess, but rather her granddaughter look-alike. Beni finds out that she is betrothed to another man (Iwatsuru Rihito) whom she doesn't wish to marry. She even goes through extreme measures to try to exit the marriage.
- Red Princess (紅姫, Beni Hime) is a princess of a country. While being pursued, an explosion happens and she falls into a lake, losing her right hand as well as her memory. A passerby finds her in the lake, confused and scared, so he takes her in. Soon, she marries that man and becomes pregnant with his child. When seeing Kagetora again, she remembers everything about her past. But even then, she refuses to return to her palace of riches, for she loves her husband. She tells Kagetora to leave and to tell her subjects that the princess is dead.

== Publication ==
Shinobi Life began as a series of one-shots published in Akita Shoten's shōjo manga magazine Princess in 2005 and 2006. A full-scale serialization began in the August 2006 issue of Princess on July 6, 2006, concluding in the April 2012 issue on March 6, 2012. A bonus spin-off story was published in the May 2012 issue on April 6, 2012. Akita Shoten collected the chapters into thirteen tankōbon volumes published under its Princess Comics imprint. Tokyopop licensed the series in English and published seven volumes before shutting down its North American publishing division in 2011. Akita Shoten completed the English translation, publishing all thirteen volumes as digital e-books from 2018 to 2019. Shinobi Life is also licensed in French by Kazé, in German by Egmont Manga & Anime, and in Chinese by Sharp Point Press.

=== Volume list ===
No.	Original release date	Original ISBN	English release date	English ISBN
1	May 16, 2006	978-4-253-19377-1	November 11, 2008 (Tokyopop); November 20, 2018 (Akita Shoten)	978-1-4278-1111-0
2	January 16, 2007	978-4-253-19378-8	March 10, 2009 (Tokyopop); November 20, 2018 (Akita Shoten)	978-1-4278-1112-7
3	August 16, 2007	978-4-253-19379-5	November 10, 2009 (Tokyopop); November 20, 2018 (Akita Shoten)	978-1-4278-1162-2
4	December 14, 2007	978-4-253-19380-1	February 2, 2010 (Tokyopop); December 11, 2018 (Akita Shoten)	978-1-4278-1539-2
5	July 16, 2008	978-4-253-19641-3	June 8, 2010 (Tokyopop); January 15, 2019 (Akita Shoten)	978-1-4278-1646-7
6	January 16, 2009	978-4-253-19642-0	September 28, 2010 (Tokyopop); April 16, 2019 (Akita Shoten)	978-1-4278-1755-6
7	June 16, 2009	978-4-253-19643-7	April 12, 2011 (Tokyopop); April 30, 2019 (Akita Shoten)	978-1-4278-1847-8
8	November 16, 2009	978-4-253-19644-4	May 28, 2019 (Akita Shoten)	—
9	May 14, 2010	978-4-253-19645-1	June 25, 2019 (Akita Shoten)	—
10	December 16, 2010	978-4-253-19646-8	July 23, 2019 (Akita Shoten)	—
11	June 16, 2011	978-4-253-19647-5	August 20, 2019 (Akita Shoten)	—
12	January 16, 2012	978-4-253-19648-2	September 17, 2019 (Akita Shoten)	—
13	June 15, 2012	978-4-253-19649-9	October 15, 2019 (Akita Shoten)	—
