= Soul Rescue =

Japanese manga series by Aya Kanno

- Cover of the first volume of Soul Rescue

ソウルレスキュー (Souru Resukyū)
- Genre: Action, fantasy
- Manga
- Written by: Aya Kanno
- Published by: Hakusensha
- English publisher: NA: Tokyopop (expired)
- Imprint: Hana to Yume Comics
- Magazine: Hana to Yume
- Original run: 2001 – 2002
- Volumes: 2

Soul Rescue (Japanese: ソウルレスキュー, Hepburn: Souru Resukyū) is a Japanese fantasy action manga series written and illustrated by Aya Kanno. It was serialized in Hakusensha's shōjo manga magazine Hana to Yume from 2001 to 2002, with its chapters collected into two tankōbon volumes. Soul Rescue was published in English by Tokyopop; however, the rights to the series reverted to Hakusensha when Tokyopop closed its North American publishing division in 2011.

== Plot ==
Renji is a rogue angel who seems to know only how to fight. God banishes Renji to earth for his recklessness. He can only return on one condition – if he is able to save ten thousand human souls. God sends an elite angel, Kaito, to watch over him and help him with his mission. Renji's abilities are dampened before his mission because his power would be too potent for earth. In order to save the ten thousand souls, God has granted Renji the power of Soul Rescue. This power enables him to relieve souls of emotional damage and heal physical damage. The power of Soul Rescue lies hidden somewhere within Renji, and he must find it in order to use it.

== Characters ==
Renji (レンジ)
The main character of the manga. He is known as "the Sword of God" because of his reckless nature in battle – causing extensive damage to surrounding structures, endangering his fellow men, and disobeying orders. He is banished from heaven because of his behaviour and must save ten thousand humans using the power of Soul Rescue, while sometimes fending off devils that try to cause trouble.
Kaito (カイト)
An elite angel, "the Eye of God", who is instructed to guide Renji on his mission, and to make sure he doesn't cause too much trouble. Because of his black hair and dark eyes (normally attributes of only devils – angels are usually created with light hair and light eyes), other angels would look down on him, which pushed him to work harder to earn respect.
Princess Shalala (シャララ, Sharara)
A young girl who is an heir to the throne in the kingdom where she lives. Under normal circumstances, her older sister would be heir to the throne, but she falls ill for several years and it seems that she won't live. After the mess is cleaned up, Shalala leaves the kingdom to go out and see the world and to become stronger like Renji. Later on she falls in love with Renji.
Vinny and Toi
Two devils that Renji and Kaito end up fighting on more than one occasion. Their goal is to drag souls to Hell, where they will be tormented and enslaved until they wither away or become devils.

== Volumes ==
No.	Original release date	Original ISBN	English release date	English ISBN
1	19 October 2001	4-592-17788-6	12 December 2006	978-1-59816-672-9
2	19 August 2002	4-592-17050-4	10 April 2007	978-1-59816-673-6

== Reception ==
Casey Brienza of Anime News Network gave the first volume an overall grade of C+. He noted that the series is "more shounen in its manifest narrative structure than it is shoujo", observing that this extends to the artwork, too, with "asymmetric panel layouts [that] are pretty cramped by shoujo manga standards and generally highlight the dynamic over the aesthetic." A. E. Sparrow of IGN agreed, stating that Soul Rescue "treads that fine line between shojo and shonen, providing plenty of bad boy angel prettiness with some rough and tumble action scenes." Sparrow concluded that while the first volume "doesn't really break any new ground in terms of art or the basic plot", its "likeable characters and solid writing and dialogue" make it a worthwhile read.
