= Takako Shigematsu =

Japanese manga artist

Takako Shigematsu しげまつ 貴子
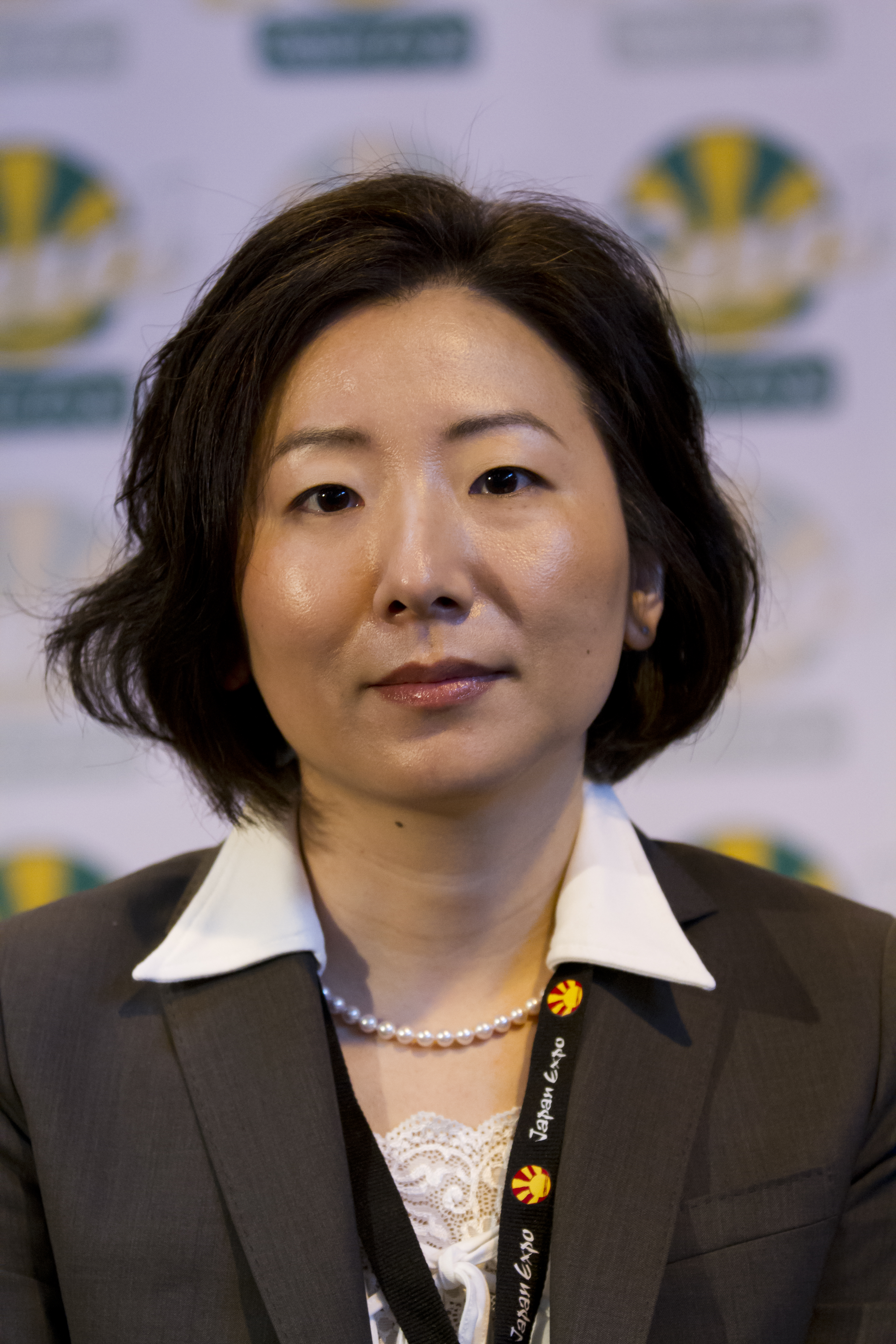
- Takako Shigematsu at Japan Expo Sud 2012
- Born: 23 August
- Area: Manga artist

Takako Shigematsu (しげまつ 貴子, Shigematsu Takako; born 23 August) is a Japanese manga artist best known for her manga series Tenshi Ja Nai!! Her first manga, published in 1995, told the tale of an all-boys dorm. However, it wasn't until her 2002 release of Taiyō Made 3m ("3 Meters from the Sun") that she truly stepped into the spotlight as a professional manga artist. Since then, she has worked on several series, including Tenshi Ja Nai!! ("I'm No Angel!"), King of the Lamp, and Ultimate Venus, all three of which were published in North America by Go! Comi before the imprint shut down in 2010. Takako is also known for her pet pug, Molly, who is mentioned in most of her manga.

== Works ==
- Taiyō Made 3m (太陽まで3m), serialized in Princess (2002)
- Tenshi Ja Nai!! (天使じゃない!!), serialized in Princess (2003–2006)
- King of the Lamp (ランプの王様), serialized in Petit Princess (2004)
- Ultimate Venus (究極ヴィーナス), serialized in Princess (2006–2009)
- Makamisama no Iu Tōri! (真神様の言うとおり!), serialized in Princess (2010–2012)
- Nekozuka-san'chi no Gokyōdai (猫塚さんちのご兄弟), serialized in Princess (2012–2013)
