= Aya Kanno =

Japanese manga artist

Aya Kanno 菅野 文
- Born: 30 January 1980 (age 46) Tokyo, Japan
- Area: Manga artist
- Notable works: Otomen; Requiem of the Rose King

Aya Kanno (菅野 文, Kanno Aya; born 30 January 1980 in Tokyo) is a Japanese manga artist. After working as an assistant to Masashi Asaki of Psychometrer Eiji fame, she debuted as a professional manga artist in Hana to Yume in 2001 with her fantasy-action series Soul Rescue. She has since published manga primarily in Hakusensha's shōjo (girls') manga anthologies: Hana to Yume, The Hana to Yume, Hana to Yume Plus, and Bessatsu Hana to Yume. Kanno is best known for her romantic comedy series Otomen, which was adapted into a live-action television drama in 2009. Her historical dark fantasy series Requiem of the Rose King, based on William Shakespeare's Richard III, was adapted into an anime by J.C.Staff in 2022.

== Works ==
=== Series ===
- Soul Rescue (ソウルレスキュー) (2001–2002)
- Kokoro ni Hana wo!! (ココロに花を!!) (2003–2004)
- Hokusō Shinsengumi (北走新選組) (2003–2004)
- Kōtetsu no Hana (凍鉄の花) (2003–2005)
- Blank Slate (悪性 －アクサガ－) (2005–2006)
- Otomen (オトメン) (2006–2012)
- Makoto no Kuni (誠のくに) (2013)
- Requiem of the Rose King (薔薇王の葬列) (2013–2022)
- Fruit of the Underworld (冥王の柘榴) (2024–present)

=== Art books ===
- Bara-Ō no Sōretsu Irasuto-shū: Keikyoku no Hitsugi (「薔薇王の葬列」イラスト集 荊棘の棺) (Akita Shoten, 15 June 2018)
