= Ikemen Sengoku =

2015 video game

- Ikémen Sengoku: Romances Across Time

イケメン戦国◆時をかける恋 (Ikemen sengoku tokiwokakeru koi)
- Genre: Otome; Historical
- Video game

Ikémen Sengoku: Romances Across Time
- Developer: CYBIRD
- Publisher: CYBIRD (Android and iOS); Otomate (PlayStation Vita)
- Designed by: Yamada Shiro
- Platform: Android iOS; PlayStation Vita; Nintendo Switch
- Released: JP: June 22, 2015 (Android and iOS); WW: June 26, 2017 (Android and iOS); JP: March 22, 2018 (PlayStation Vita); JP: April 28, 2022 (Nintendo Switch)
- Manga

Ikemen Sengoku: Tenka-bito no onna ni naru ki wa nai ka
- Written by: CYBIRD
- Illustrated by: Mika Kajiyama
- Published by: Akita Shoten
- Magazine: Princess
- Original run: February 2017 – September 2018
- Volumes: 4
- Anime television series
- Directed by: Shigeyuki Watanabe
- Written by: Masayuki Kibe
- Music by: Keisuke Ito
- Studio: TMS Entertainment
- Licensed by: Crunchyroll
- Original network: Tokyo MX
- Original run: July 12, 2017 – September 27, 2017
- Episodes: 12
- Manga

Manga-ban Ikemen Sengoku Akechi Mitsuhide-hen: Kono otoko, horereba jigoku
- Written by: CYBIRD
- Illustrated by: Akira Sakamoto
- Published by: Shogakukan
- Imprint: Flower Comics Special
- Original run: July 15, 2020 – July 20, 2022
- Volumes: 4

Ikemen Sengoku: Romances Across Time (イケメン戦国◆時をかける恋, Ikemen sengoku tokiwokakeru koi) is a Japanese otome visual novel originally released on June 22, 2015, by CYBIRD. It is part of CYBIRD's Ikemen series.

The game, originally made for smartphones, was later released on the PlayStation Vita and Nintendo Switch. The game has also received two manga and one anime adaptation. There have also been various stage play adaptations.

== Characters ==
Mai Mizusaki (水崎舞, Mizusaki Mai)
Name can be changed
The protagonist (player). While traveling in Kyoto, she is swallowed by a wormhole opened by a sudden lightning strike and transported 500 years back in time to the Sengoku period.

Oda Nobunaga (織田信長, Oda Nobunaga)
Voiced by Tomokazu Sugita

Date Masamune (伊達政宗, Date Masamune)
Voiced by Kazuki Kato

Sanada Yukimura (真田幸村, Sanada Yukimura)
Voiced by Yoshimasa Hosoya, Kensho Ono (from June 2017)

Toyotomi Hideyoshi (豊臣秀吉, Toyotomi Hideyoshi)
Voiced by Kousuke Toriumi

Tokugawa Ieyasu (徳川家康, Tokugawa Ieyasu)
Voiced by Toshiki Masuda

Akechi Mitsuhide (明智光秀, Akechi Mitsuhide)
Voiced by Shunsuke Takeuchi

Ishida Mitsunari (石田三成, Ishida Mitsunari)
Voiced by Yoshiki Yamaya

Takeda Shingen (武田信玄, Takeda Shingen)
Voiced by Yuichiro Umehara

Uesugi Kenshin (上杉謙信, Uesugi Kenshin)
Voiced by Hiroaki Miura
For certain reasons, he maintains a cold attitude toward women.

Sarutobi Sasuke (猿飛佐助, Sarutobi Sasuke)
Voiced by Kenji Akabane

Kennyo (顕如, Kennyo)
Voiced by Tarusuke Shingaki

Mōri Motonari (毛利元就, Mōri Motonari)
Voiced by Katsuyuki Konishi
First appeared in the anime.

Mori Ranmaru (森蘭丸, Mori Ranmaru)
Voiced by Shouta Aoi
First appeared in the PlayStation Vita version.

Imagawa Yoshimoto (今川義元, Imagawa Yoshimoto)
Voiced by Taku Yashiro
First appeared in the PlayStation Vita version.

Maeda Keiji (前田慶次, Maeda Keiji)
Voiced by Chiharu Sawashiro
Appears from Act 2.

Naoe Kanetsugu (直江兼続, Naoe Kanetsugu)
Voiced by Akinori Nakagawa
Appears from Act 2.

Kichō (帰蝶, Kichō)
Voiced by Yuki Kaji
Appears from Act 2.

Sen no Rikyū (千利休, Sen no Rikyū)
Voiced by Hayato Dojima
Appears from Ikemen Sengoku: Toki wo Kakeru Koi - Eien.

Ashikaga Yoshiteru (足利義輝, Ashikaga Yoshiteru)
Voiced by Daiki Yamashita
Appears from Ikemen Sengoku: Toki wo Kakeru Koi - Eien.

Matsunaga Hisahide (松永久秀, Matsunaga Hisahide)
Voiced by Shogo Sakata
Appears from Ikemen Sengoku: Toki wo Kakeru Koi - Eien.

Kuroda Kanbei (黒田官兵衛, Kuroda Kanbei)
Voiced by Takuya Sato
Appears from Ikemen Sengoku: Toki wo Kakeru Koi - Eien.

Kirigakure Saizō (霧隠才蔵, Kirigakure Saizō)
Voiced by Chiaki Kobayashi
Appears from Ikemen Sengoku: Toki wo Kakeru Koi - Eien.

== Development and release ==
Ikemen Sengoku: Romances Across Time (イケメン戦国◆時をかける恋, Ikemen sengoku tokiwokakeru koi) was originally released on June 22, 2015, by CYBIRD for Android and iOS.

The game was released in English for Android and IOS on June 26, 2017.

On March 22, 2018, the game, retitled Ikemen Sengoku: Love Across Time, A New Encounter (イケメン戦国◆時をかける恋 新たなる出逢い, Ikemen sengoku: tokiwokakeru koi aratanaru deai), was announced at the Otomate Party 2016, and released for the PlayStation Vita by Otomate. On April 28, 2022, the game was released for the Nintendo Switch.

== Manga ==
The first manga adaptation, titled Ikemen Sengoku: Tenka-bito no onna ni naru ki wa nai ka (イケメン戦国〜天下人の女になる気はないか〜; lit. 'Ikemen Sengoku: Wouldn't You Like to Become the Woman of a Ruler?') illustrated by Mika Kajiyama, was serialized in Akita Shoten's Princess magazine from February 2017, till September 2018.

| No. | Release date | ISBN |
|---|---|---|
| 1 | July 14, 2017 | 978-4-253-15410-9 |
| 2 | November 16, 2017 | 978-4-253-15411-6 |
| 3 | April 16, 2018 | 978-4-253-15412-3 |
| 4 | October 16, 2018 | 978-4-253-15413-0 |

A second manga, titled Ikemen Sengoku Manga: Akechi Mitsuhide Arc: Fall for This Man, and It’s Hell (漫画版 イケメン戦国 明智光秀編 〜この男、惚れれば地獄〜, Manga-ban ikemen sengoku akechi mitsuhide-hen 〜 kono otoko, horereba jigoku 〜), illustrated by Akira Sakamoto was serialized via ebook from June 15, 2020, until July 20, 2022. The series has been compiled into 4 tankōbon volumes by Shogakukan.

| No. | Release date | ISBN |
|---|---|---|
| 1 | August 26, 2022 | 978-4-09-871777-4 |
| 2 | September 26, 2022 | 978-4-09-871800-9 |
| 3 | October 26, 2022 | 978-4-09-871801-6 |
| 4 | November 25, 2022 | 978-4-09-871802-3 |

== Anime ==
During the Animate Girls Festival 2016 event, CYBIRD announced an anime adaptation. The anime, directed by Shigeyuki Watanabe, premiered on Tokyo MX on July 12, 2017, and ran until September 27, 2017, with each episode being a 5-minute short. The series is licenced by Crunchyroll. The theme song is Yes/No sung by Star Concerto.

| No. | Title | Original release date |
|---|---|---|
| 1 | "Ikemen Smash"; Transliteration: "Ikemen Sumasshu" (Japanese: イケメンスマッシュ) | July 12, 2017 |
| 2 | "Ikemen: Secret Sketch"; Transliteration: "Ikemen Himitsu no Suketchi" (Japanese: イケメン秘密のスケッチ) | July 19, 2017 |
| 3 | "Ikemen Hey Man"; Transliteration: "Ikemen Heimēn" (Japanese: イケメンヘイメーン) | July 26, 2017 |
| 4 | "Ikemen Junk Mail"; Transliteration: "Ikemen Meiwaku Yabumi" (Japanese: イケメン迷惑矢文) | August 2, 2017 |
| 5 | "Ikemen Attic"; Transliteration: "Ikemen Tenjōura" (Japanese: イケメン天井裏) | August 9, 2017 |
| 6 | "Ikemen Are Furious"; Transliteration: "Ikemen wa Gekido Shita" (Japanese: イケメンは激怒した) | August 16, 2017 |
| 7 | "Ikemen Beach"; Transliteration: "Ikemen Bīchi" (Japanese: イケメンビーチ) | August 23, 2017 |
| 8 | "Ikemen Party People"; Transliteration: "Ikemen Pātī Pīpō" (Japanese: イケメンパーティーピーポー) | August 30, 2017 |
| 9 | "Ikemen Close Call!"; Transliteration: "Ikemen Kikiippatsu!" (Japanese: イケメン危機一髪！) | September 6, 2017 |
| 10 | "Ikemen Thunder"; Transliteration: "Ikemen Sandā" (Japanese: イケメンサンダー) | September 13, 2017 |
| 11 | "Goodbye, Ikemen"; Transliteration: "Sayonara, Ikemen" (Japanese: さよなら、イケメン) | September 20, 2017 |
| 12 | "Time Flies but the Story Doesn't End"; Transliteration: "Toki o Kakeru ga Monogatari wa Owaranai" (Japanese: 時をかけるが物語は終わらない) | September 27, 2017 |

== Stage plays ==
A total of 12 installments (including 1 original story) of the play, Ikemen Sengoku: The Stage (イケメン戦国 THE STAGE), were held from 2017 until 2024.

The first installment, Ikemen Sengoku THE STAGE: Sanada Yukimura Arc (イケメン戦国 THE STAGE〜真田幸村編〜, Ikemen sengoku THE sutēji: sanada yukimura-hen) was written and directed by Yosuke Miyagi, it was held at the Hakuhinkan Theater from April 19 till April 23, 2017. The second installment, Ikemen Sengoku THE STAG: Oda Army VS Pirates Motonari Mori Edition (イケメン戦国 THE STAGE〜織田軍 VS 海賊 毛利元就編〜, Ikemen sengoku THE sutēji: Oda-gun VS kaizoku mōri motonari-hen), was held from August 30 to September 3, 2017. The third installment, Ikemen Sengoku THE STAGE: Oda Nobunaga Arc (イケメン戦国 THE STAGE〜織田信長編〜, Ikemen sengoku THE sutēji: oda nobunaga-hen) was held at Theater 1010 from April 5 till April 9, 2018. The fourth installment, Ikemen Sengoku THE STAGE: Kenshin Uesugi Arc (イケメン戦国 THE STAGE〜上杉謙信編〜, Ikemen sengoku THE sutēji: uesugi kenshin-hen), was held at the Sunshine Theatre (Japan) from February 21 till February 24, 2019. The fifth installment, Ikemen Sengoku THE STAGE: Side Story: The Story of the Beginning (イケメン戦国 THE STAGE 番外編～はじまりの物語～, Ikemen sengoku THE sutēji bangai-hen: hajimari no monogatari), written by Masami Ito, it was held at the Hakuhinkan Theatre from December 26 till 30th, 2019, it was later released on DVD. The sixth installment, Ikemen Sengoku THE STAGE: Akechi Mitsuhide Arc (イケメン戦国 THE STAGE〜明智光秀編〜, Ikemen sengoku THE sutēji: akechi mitsuhide-hen), written by Naohiro Ise, was held at the Ex Theater Roppongi from September 4 till September 9, 2020. An original story, Allied Army VS "Warlord of Chaos" Saika Magoichi Arc (イケメン戦国 THE STAGE〜連合軍VS“戦乱の亡者”雑賀孫一編〜, Ikemen sengoku THE sutēji: rengō-gun VS “senran no mōja” saika magoichi-hen) was meant to be held at the Hulic Hall Tokyo from August 19 to 23, 2021, however, due to Covid-19, it was cancelled. The seventh installment, Ikemen Sengoku THE STAGE Special: First Dream of the New Year!: Welcome to Club Ransei! (イケメン戦国 THE STAGE スペシャル 初夢！～ようこそ！くらぶ乱世へ～, Ikemen sengoku THE sutēji supesharu hatsuyume!: Yōkoso! Kurabu ranse e) was held at Theater 1010 from January 14 till 16, 2022, it was meant to celebrate the 5th anniversary, and was a special performance produced based on the campaign "Welcome to Club Chaos." The eighth installment, Ikemen Sengoku THE STAGE: Allied Forces vs. "Specter of War" Saika Magoichi Arc (イケメン戦国 THE STAGE～連合軍VS“戦乱の亡者”雑賀孫一編～, Ikemen sengoku THE sutēji: rengō-gun VS “senran no mōja” saika magoichi-hen), was originally meant to be held in 2021, however, it was cancelled and later performed at the Hulic Hall Tokyo from August 18 till 23, 2022. The ninth installment, Ikemen Sengoku THE STAGE: The Sarutobi Sasuke Arc (イケメン戦国 THE STAGE～猿飛佐助編～, Ikemen sengoku THE sutēji: sarutobisasuke-hen), written and directed by Kazuhito Yoneyama, was held at the Shibuya Cultural Center Owada Sakura Hall from November 12 till 15, 2022. The tenth installment, Ikemen Sengoku THE STAGE: Kicho Arc (イケメン戦国THE STAGE～帰蝶編～, Ikemen sengoku THE sutēji: ki chō-hen), written and directed by Yosuke Miyagi, was held at the Shibuya Cultural Center Owada Densho Hall from April 21 to 24, 2023. The eleventh and final installment, titled Ikemen Sengoku THE STAGE: FINAL (イケメン戦国 THE STAGE ～FINAL～, Ikemen sengoku THE sutēji ~ FINAL ~) was held at the Theater 1010 from August 8 till 12, 2024.

=== Cast ===
| | Sanada Yukimura Arc | Oda Army VS “Pirate” Mōri Motonari Arc | Oda Nobunaga Arc | Uesugi Kenshin Arc | Side story | Akechi Mitsuhide Arc | Allied Army VS “Warlord of Chaos” Saika Magoichi Arc (Performance Cancelled) | Special | Allied Army VS “Warlord of Chaos” Saika Magoichi Arc | Sarutobi Sasuke Arc | Kichō Arc | FINAL |
|---|---|---|---|---|---|---|---|---|---|---|---|---|
| Oda Nobunaga | Ken Ogasawara | | | | | | | | | | | |
| Date Masamune | Bishin Kawasumi | Kosuke Yonemoto | | | Yu Matsumura | Kosuke Yonemoto | | | | | | Yu Matsumura |
| Sanada Yukimura | Shota Konuma | － | Ichiyo Ara | | | | Shota Konuma | － | Shota Konuma | | | |
| Toyotomi Hideyoshi | Mutsumi Midorikawa | | Mutsumi Midorikawa (Passion Route); Kodai Takigawa (Happiness Route) | Kodai Takigawa | | | | | | | | Hikaru Inaba |
| Tokugawa Ieyasu | Masahiro Sugiyama | | | Rui Kihara | | Nobunaga Sato | Yo Maejima | | | | | Yu Ogawa |
| Akechi Mitsuhide | Yusuke Seto | Zenichi Hashimoto | | Akira Domiki | Zenichi Hashimoto | | | | | | | |
| Ishida Mitsunari | Masataka Amano | | | | | | | | | | | |
| Takeda Shingen | Kanda Uumaru Tachibana | － | Tatsumaru Tachibana | | | | | Tatsumaru Tachibana (Appears only on 1/16) | Tatsumaru Tachibana | | － | Tatsumaru Tachibana |
| Sarutobi Sasuke | Joji Saotome | | | | | | | | Joji Saotome (voice only) | Joji Saotome | | |
| Kennyo | Koichi Takamatsu | | | Shunichi Takahashi | Seijiro Nakamura | | | － | Shunichi Takahashi | Seijiro Nakamura | Shunichi Takahashi | |
| Mōri Motonari | － | Motohisa Harashima | | － | | Motohisa Harashima | － | Motohisa Harashima | － | Motohisa Harashima | | |
| Mori Ranmaru | － | | Yuzuki Hoshimoto | | | | | Yuzuki Hoshimoto (voice only) | Yuzuki Hoshimoto | | － | |
| Imagawa Yoshimoto | － | | Goro Takeishi | | | | | | | | | |
| Maeda Keiji | － | | | | | | Hiromu Kudo | | | － | Hiromu Kudo | ー |
| Naoe Kanetsugu | － | | | | | | Kento | | | － | | ー |
| Kichō | － | | | | Kentaro Akisawa | | | | | － | Kentaro Akisawa | ー |
| Ashikaga Yoshiaki | － | | | | | Kazumi Doi | Keiju Takenouchi | | | － | | |
| Mai Mizusaki | Kaori Hayano | | | | － | Mizuki Saito | － | | | Narumi Koga | | ー |

== Reception ==
In Issue 1528 of Famitsu Review Scores, the PlayStation Vita version of Ikemen Sengoku was given a score of 32 put of 40.
