= Oyayubihime Infinity =

Manga series by Toru Fujieda

- First volume of the CMX Manga English release

オヤユビヒメ∞ (Oyayubi-hime Infiniti)
- Genre: Comedy, Romance, Supernatural
- Manga
- Written by: Toru Fujieda
- Published by: Akita Shoten
- English publisher: NA: CMX Manga
- Magazine: Princess
- Original run: April 1, 2004 – May 16, 2006 (tankōbon)
- Volumes: 6

Oyayubihime Infinity (Japanese: オヤユビヒメ∞, Hepburn: Oyayubi-hime Infiniti) is a shōjo manga series by Toru Fujieda. It was published in Japan by Akita Shoten starting in April 2004, and continuing for six tankōbon volumes until its conclusion in May 2006. The series was licensed by CMX manga for an English language release in North American starting in June 2006.

== Plot ==
Tsubame is a young teenage boy searching for his one true, Agemaki. When he meets Kanoko, a girl with a birthmark of a butterfly on her left hand, he believes that she is Agemaki. Kanoko doesn't believe it at first, but they meet several other teenagers with similar birthmarks and stories. As the series progresses, she begins to fall in love with Tsubame, only to learn that he may not be her soul mate after all.

== Media ==
Oyayubihime Infinity was first serialized in Princess magazine. The individual chapters were published in six tankōbon volumes by Akita Shoten starting on April 1, 2004, and continuing until May 16, 2006.

The series was licensed by CMX manga for an English language release in North American when began releasing the series in 2006, shortly before its conclusion in Japan.

=== Volume list ===
No.	Original release date	Original ISBN	English release date	English ISBN
1	April 1, 2004	978-4253194013	June 28, 2006	1401210759
Chapter 1: Isn't this, you know, not possible?; Chapter 2: "Destined love" is kind of annoying; Chapter 3: The Rabbit Prince; Chapter 4: The Second Encounter; Chapter 5: Butterflies, airplanes, and cellular phones reception
2	September 9, 2004	978-4253194020	September 27, 2006	1401210767
Chapter 6: Searching for Thumbs (r "The Fellowship of the Thumb"); Chapter 7: The Secret of the Thumb; Chapter 8: Betrayal; Chapter 9: The Vision Mayu Saw; Chapter 10: Escape (or How I Really Feel)
3	February 16, 2005	978-4253194037	December 27, 2006	1401210775
Chapter 11: I Am Agemaki; Chapter 12: Scoop: scandal; Chapter 13: Maya rescued; Chapter 14: Agemaki and Yumeji; Chapter 15: Commence attack
4	July 16, 2005	978-4253194044	March 28, 2007	1401210783
Chapter 16: Harajuku Waltz; Chapter 17: The Pursuit Scene, in Snw; Chapter 18; Where the Heart Goes; Chapter 19: The Flying Kiss; The Sound of Bells to the North; Chapter 20: The Illusion
5	December 16, 2005	978-4253194051	May 2, 2007	1401213057
Chapter 21: The Demon Girl; Chapter 22: Confession Time; Chapter 23: The Aquarium; Chapter 24: Love, Fireworks; Chapter 25: The Promise
6	May 16, 2006	978-4253194068	August 22, 2007	1401213073
Chapter 26: The Messenger; Chapter 27: The Truth; Chapter 28: Best Buddies; Chapter 29: One Butterfly Ges, the Other Stays; Final Chapter: Wings of the Future; Final Volume: Bonus Manga
