= Mangapedia =

Japanese online encyclopedia

- Native name: マンガペディア
- Website type: Online encyclopedia
- Available in: Japanese
- Headquarters: Tokyo, Japan
- Owners: Digitalio; 8-Lynx; Hyakka Sōgō Risāchi Sentā
- Website: https://mangapedia.com
- Launched: April 7, 2016; 10 years ago
- Current status: Active

Mangapedia (マンガペディア) is a Japanese online encyclopedia specializing in manga and anime run by Hyakka Sōgō Risāchi Sentā (百科綜合リサーチ・センター), (Note: A general incorporated association established by Heibonsha and Shogakukan.) 8-lynx (エイトリンクス), (Note: A Shogakukan's group company.) and Digitalio. Contents are written by contributors with extensive knowledge of manga and anime, such as manga-related association Manganight and critic Nagayama Kaworu. The Mangapedia website also provides news and special articles featuring manga and anime works.

Mangapedia officially started on April 7, 2016, as world's first systematic manga encyclopedia, following its preliminary release in January 25, 2016. It supports no language other than Japanese, notwithstanding aiming to develop as a multilingual service.
