= Mick Takeuchi =

Japanese manga artist

Mick Takeuchi (竹内 未来, Takeuchi Miku; born July 4) is a Japanese manga artist, best known for her eleven-volume series Her Majesty's Dog (Joō-sama no Inu), which has been translated into English by Go! Comi as they were very popular in Japan. All eleven volumes of Her Majesty's Dog have now been published in English, as well as Bound Beauty and A Wise Man Sleeps. All of her manga were licensed by the now defunct Go! Comi, only Her Majesty's Dog was completely released to America while only a few volumes of Bound Beauty and A Wise Man Sleeps were released.

Takeuchi was a guest of honor at Anime Expo 2006 in Anaheim, California.

Ever since she was 13 years old, she knew she wanted to create manga. One of her influences is Rumiko Takahashi, in particular Takahashi's series Urusei Yatsura. To relax, she enjoys playing with her Miniature Schnauzers, Milky and Kentarō. Although "Miku" is a traditional Japanese given name, "Mick" Takeuchi is actually named after Mick Jagger.

== Published works ==
- Ayakashi Hime Kurenai (妖姫くれない, Ayakashi-hime Kurenai; "Supernatural Princess Kurenai")
- Her Majesty's Dog (女王様の犬, Joō-sama no Inu)
- A Wise Man Sleeps (賢者は眠る 新城未明の宝石事件簿, Kenja wa Nemuru: Shinjō Mimei no Hōseki Jikenbo; "A Wise Man Sleeps: The Story of the Jewel of the New Urban Dawn Case")
- Mikeneko Holmes no Kyoufukan (三毛猫ホームズの恐怖館, Mikeneko Hōmuzu no Kyōfukan; "Three-Fur-Cat Holmes of the Terror Building")
- Bound Beauty (縛り屋小町, Shibariya Komachi)
- Zettaifukujuu: Itsutsu no Koi ni Torawareru (絶対服従5つの恋にとらわ, Zettai-fukujū: Itsutsu no Koi ni Torawareru; "Absolute Obedience: Itsutsu, Captured by Love")
- Honey × Bullet (HONEY×BULLET, Hanī × baretto; ハニーXバレット)
