= Otomen =

Japanese manga and television series

- Cover of the first manga volume

オトメン(乙男)
- Genre: Romantic comedy
- Manga
- Written by: Aya Kanno
- Published by: Hakusensha
- English publisher: NA: Viz Media
- Magazine: Bessatsu Hana to Yume
- Original run: March 25, 2006 – November 26, 2012
- Volumes: 18
- Television drama
- Directed by: Masaki Tanimura
- Written by: Teruo Noguchi; Maki Kurihara; Ritsuko Hanzawa; Kota Fukuhara
- Original network: Fuji TV
- Original run: August 1, 2009 – October 27, 2009
- Episodes: 12

Otomen (オトメン(乙男)) is a Japanese romantic comedy manga written and illustrated by Aya Kanno, which began in Bessatsu Hana to Yume in late 2006 and concluded on November 26, 2012. The series has been adapted into a live action TV drama. The series has been one of the best-selling shōjo properties in America, since being licensed by Viz Media. The series is also licensed in France by Delcourt and in Spain by Planeta DeAgostini.

== Plot ==
Asuka Masamune is the coolest, manliest guy in his school. He is the captain of the kendo team where he reached the national championship tournament, and also excels in judo and karate. However, he harbors a secret: he is an otomen, a guy who really loves things that are usually associated with girls: cooking, sewing, and especially reading shōjo manga love stories. He hides this part of his life from his classmates until he meets and falls in love with Ryo Miyakozuka, the daughter of a martial artist and heir to his dojo who appears to be interested in manly guys. He is encouraged by his schoolmate Juta Tachibana to pursue a relationship with her and for them to be honest with each other, but unbeknownst to him, Juta is secretly a shojo manga artist of Asuka's favorite manga.

== Characters ==
=== Main ===
Asuka Masamune (正宗 飛鳥, Masamune Asuka)
Asuka is a very tall, masculine and cool high school boy, but secretly, he loves all things related to girls (pink, sparkly and cute stuff, cooking, love comics, etc.). This, however, does not stop him from being necessarily tough on occasion- he can defend himself and his friends. When Asuka was young his father left his family because he wanted to become a woman. This affected Asuka's mother severely and when she saw that her son was starting to like girly things she forced him to be masculine. Asuka also clearly states that while he likes girly things, he does not want to become a woman. When a new girl in school, Ryo Miyakozuka, is being bullied he defends her and later falls in love with her. Among his talents, besides sports, are cooking and sewing. He also enjoys reading the fictional shōjo manga Love Chick.
Author Aya Kanno has noted that Asuka has hobbies and sensitivities that are opposite of her own personal likes. She finds that it makes Asuka more naturally feminine.^{Vol. 1 author's notes}
Ryo Miyakozuka (都塚 りょう, Miyakozuka Ryō)
Ryo is a new transfer student at Asuka's school. She lives with her father who is a very tough police officer, and of which owns their family dojo. Even though she is a girl, she cannot sew, cook, bake, make bento or do any other "girly" things with which Asuka helps her. She also likes action movies.
Author Aya Kanno notes that Ryo is the exact opposite of Asuka, but that Ryo has a different perspective on masculinity than Kanno likes. Kanno perceives her as "the extremely thick-skinned yet clueless cool boy in shojo manga".^{Vol. 1 author's notes}
Juta Tachibana (橘 充太, Tachibana Jūta)
A playboy who befriends Asuka and Ryo, and helps Asuka with his relationship with Ryo. Under the pen name Jewel Sachihana, he is actually the author of Asuka's favorite manga, Love Chick (ラブチック, Rabuchikku), which runs in the magazine Hana to Mame,^{Vol.1 notes} He first was inspired to model his Asuka girl character after Masamune when he saw the latter help out a child with a stuffed animal. As a result, his manga moved up from second place to first place in readership and related awards. Upon getting to know Ryo, he adds her to the manga as a guy, and tries to further their relationship whenever his story bogs down.
Juta is the only son and eldest in a family of 11 children.^{Vol. 3} He was inspired to become a manga artist after meeting a girl who let him borrow a shōjo manga. He ended up falling in love with her, only to find out that she was moving away. He promised to see her off, but by the time he got to her house, she was already gone, leaving him heart broken. He returned home to find the manga she loaned him, unread. He had forgotten about it and never gave it back. Juta reads it and falls in love with shōjo manga.^{Vol. 5}
Kanno notes that Juta was originally a cool character but gets more comedic after the third chapter, and he is a shojo manga artist through and through. She admires his passion for his work and notes that he is the most grounded of the three characters.^{Ch. 1 author's notes}
Yamato Ariake (有明 大和, Ariake Yamato)
An underclassman at Asuka's school, Yamato has a very girly appearance which he hates. He loves martial arts and trains hard to become good. He admires manliness and has long delusional fantasies about being manly. He believes Asuka to be the ideal man and is oblivious to the fact that Asuka is an otomen. He falls in love with many different girls but is unable to get a girlfriend.^{Vol. 5} Kanno notes that she initially had a difficult time keeping Yamato in the story as there were not many places where he could be used.^{Vol. 2 author's notes}
Hajime Tonomine (多武峰 一, Tōnomine Hajime)
The captain of Kinbara High School's kendo team, he sees Asuka as his lifelong rival.^{Vol. 3} He is the strong and silent type but is actually an otomen who is good with doing makeup. Similar to Asuka, Tonomine's father told him to give up his girly habits, fearing it would interfere with his Kendo. Juta calls him a "tsun-sama", a portmanteau of tsundere (cold on the outside, warm on the inside) and ore-sama (self-confident, narcissistic).^{Vol. 3, 4} In one story arc, he and Asuka are recruited to do makeovers for a local television show as masked characters called the Beauty Samurai.^{Vol. 5, 6}
Kitora Kurokawa (黒川 樹虎, Kurokawa Kitora)
Juta's classmate. He has a mysterious, somewhat threatening appearance thanks to his tall stature and bangs that cover his eyes. With his family running a flower shop, he has been obsessed with the beauty of flowers and covers everything from buildings to people with them. He was in a relationship with a girl but gave it up when she told him he had to choose between her and flowers.^{Vol. 4} He is an otomen who refers to himself as the "flower evangelist". Kitora knows Juta's alter-ego as Jewel Sachihana, but protects it.

=== Supporting ===
Kiyomi Masamune
Asuka's mother. Traumatized by her husband's announcement that he always dreamed of being a woman, she takes many measures to ensure Asuka is very manly. Asuka worries she will faint if he reveals his otomen secret to her.^{Vol. 2}
Miyuki Yoshino
A photojournalist who originally was hoping to expose the identities of the Beauty Samurai duo, later revealed to be Asuka's aunt on his father's side.^{Vol. 6}
Mira Jonouchi
A popular shojo manga artist whom Juta becomes friends with. It is later revealed to Juta (and later Asuka) that Mira is actually an otomen, and that he dresses up as a woman in Mira's public appearances and signings, with a hand fan covering her face.
Hiromi Yoshino
The chef and the owner of Patisserie Violet who held the baking class for men, which is Asuka's safe haven from his anti-otomen mother.^{Vol. 9-11} He is later revealed to be Asuka's father and Kiyomi's ex-husband.
Kasuga Masamune
Asuka's cousin on his mother's side, he is brought in as the acting chairman as well as a transfer student in order to stop the otomen.^{Vol. 9} He has light hair and wears glasses.^{Vol. 8} When he was young, he had a crush on Asuka and even confessed that he wanted to marry "her", not discovering that he was a boy until years later.^{Vol. 9}
Mr. Amakashi
A teacher at Asuka's school. He helps Asuka and his friends with hiding their otomen activities when Kasuga is running the school.^{Vol. 8}
Otowa Moematsu
A young home economics teacher who is brought to Asuka's school by Kiyomi in order to teach women to be more feminine. Her nickname is O-tan, and she is very popular among the boys. She tries to get Ryo to act more feminine but fails. However, she is surprised that Ryo has Asuka as a boyfriend, and that Asuka is a much better at girl activities than even herself. It is later revealed that when she was a student, she was a tomboy who was a member of the softball team and who did not do any housework. Her boyfriend at the time told her that she was not cute and broke up with her, prompting her to try extra hard at being feminine. After Asuka defends her when she encounters her ex, she agrees to part ways with her ex and lets Asuka continue with his otomen activities. She vows to wait for the right guy to love her for who she is, and to continue being an angel to the single boys.^{Vol. 9-10}
Kibino
A science teacher who is brought in by Kiyomi to reform the school. He has messy hair, wears science goggles and a mask that covers his mouth. He enjoys making inventions, but has gotten disheartened recently because the inventions are not getting much attention. He concocted a formula that mass hypnotized Asuka's schoolmates into believing boys should do manly things, while girls do girly things.^{Vol. 10}
Naito Mifune
A Japanese history teacher who is brought in by Kiyomi to reform the school. He intends to turn all the boys into manly samurai. He hosts a field trip at an Edo period themed town in which the boys have to act like samurai and the girls have to act like geisha. However, when rockslides and storms cut off communication of the town from the outside world, he discovers that Asuka, Ryo and the others are quite capable of handling things. He thus concludes that otomen are the ultimate samurai.^{Vol. 10-11}
Suzaku Ohji
A teacher who is brought in by Kiyomi to reform Asuka's school.
Hanamasa
Joji

== Media ==
=== Manga ===
The manga is written and illustrated by Aya Kanno and was serialized in the shōjo manga magazine Bessatsu Hana to Yume from 2006 to November 26, 2012. Serial chapters were collected in eighteen tankōbon volumes by Hakusensha Viz Media licensed the series for its Shojo Beat imprint. French publisher Delcourt licensed Otomen and released its first volume in September 2008. As of November 2013, all eighteen volumes have been released. In Spain, the publisher Planeta DeAgostini has licensed the series as Otomen with its first volume released in December 2008. As of April 2011, nine volumes have been released. The German publisher Carlsen Verlag has made eighteen volumes available in the ePub format.

==== Volume list ====
| No. | Original release date | Original ISBN | North America release date | North America ISBN |
|---|---|---|---|---|
| 1 | January 19, 2007 | 978-4-592-18414-0 | February 3, 2009 | 1-4215-2186-5 |
| 2 | May 18, 2007 | 978-4-592-18415-7 | May 5, 2009 | 1-4215-2187-3 |
| 3 | September 19, 2007 | 978-4-592-18416-4 | August 4, 2009 | 1-4215-2472-4 |
| 4 | December 18, 2007 | 978-4-592-18417-1 | November 3, 2009 | 1-4215-2537-2 |
| 5 | April 18, 2008 | 978-4-592-18418-8 | February 2, 2010 | 1-4215-2737-5 |
| 6 | August 19, 2008 | 978-4-592-18419-5 | May 4, 2010 | 1-4215-2930-0 |
| 7 | March 19, 2009 | 978-4-592-18737-0 | August 3, 2010 | 1-4215-3236-0 |
| 8 | August 24, 2009 | 978-4-592-18738-7 | November 2, 2010 | 1-4215-3591-2 |
Ryo is transferring schools, so the guys have a series of activities to send her off. Yamato has Fra-Fra support him in a farewell song; Kitora has them plant flowers; Juta takes them to the amusement park; and Asuka takes them on a mountain hike. Hajime gives makeup advice on an Internet message board when he encounters a woman online who really needs a lot of help. Asuka visits Ryo's grandfather, but when he starts doing housework and cooking, Ryo's grandfather realizes something's different about him. He reveals to Asuka that he too is an otomen, and agrees to move to Tokyo, bringing Ryo back. Realizing that the school has a number of otomen, Asuka's mother intends to ban the otomen lifestyle She brings in four new teachers to enforce that guys do manly things, and that girls do girly things with no crossover activities. She also brings in Asuka's cousin Kasuga to be the acting chairman.
| 9 | September 18, 2009 | 978-4-592-18739-4 | February 1, 2011 | 1-4215-3690-0 |
Kasuga and the new teachers enforce the new school rules that boys are to act like men, girls are to act like women, and that anyone exhibiting an otomen lifestyle will be expelled. Kasuga discovers Juta's shojo manga journal and suspects he is Jewel. Kasuga has the art class draw manga in order to out him. Juta receives a written plea to Jewel from Asuka to help save Juta by agreeing to meet in person with Kasuga. Juta goes to Mira Jonouchi for help. They try to trick Kasuga by having Ryo dress up but it fails. Otowa Moematsu, the home economics teacher, tries to train the girls, but discovers Ryo is really bad at cooking. She visits her home to discover that she is a tomboy who enjoys martial arts. But she is surprised that Ryo has Asuka as a boyfriend.
| 10 | February 19, 2010 | 978-4-592-19200-8 | May 3, 2011 | 1-4215-3830-X |
O-tan learns Asuka has a lot of girly hobbies and interests. She tries to set up a mixer for Yamato to meet girls, and to see what Asuka would do. Asuka frustrates O-tan more with his perfect girlish manners. O-tan encounters her ex, but Asuka stands up for her. Later, science teacher Kibino hypnotizes the guys and girls at school so that they behave according to their gender, but Kitora helps Asuka and friends break out of the spell. Naito Mifune, the Japanese history teacher, takes them on field trip to Edo period-themed town where they are to train to be samurai, and women to train to behave like geishas. They meet Hajime and the Kinbara school. In the bonus manga chapter, Asuka is recruited to be a "Beauty Samurai" maiden for a television episode.
| 11 | September 17, 2010 | 978-4-592-19221-3 | August 2, 2011 | 1-4215-3978-0 |
| 12 | February 18, 2011 | 978-4-592-19222-0 | February 7, 2012 | 978-1-42-154109-9 |
| 13 | August 19, 2011 | 978-4-592-19223-7 | September 4, 2012 | 978-1-42-154265-2 |
| 14 | January 20, 2012 | 978-4-592-19224-4 | January 1, 2013 | 978-1-42-154925-5 |
| 15 | April 20, 2012 | 978-4-592-19431-6 | May 7, 2013 | 978-1-42-155271-2 |
| 16 | September 20, 2012 | 978-4-592-19432-3 | August 6, 2013 | 978-1-42-155480-8 |
| 17 | January 18, 2013 | 978-4-592-19433-0 | January 7, 2014 | 978-1-42-155968-1 |
| 18 | January 18, 2013 | 978-4-592-19434-7 | May 6, 2014 | 978-1-42-156309-1 |

=== Live-action drama ===
The July 2009 issue of Hana to Yume magazine, in which Otomen runs, announced that a live-action drama had been green-lit, and would premier on Japanese television on August 1, 2009. Kaho portrays Ryo, and Masaki Okada plays Asuka. The ending theme song is "ラバソー〜lover soul〜" sung by Kou Shibasaki. A photobook for the live action series by Hakusensha in September 2009 for 1000 yen, entitled Otomen (Otsu Otoko) Ofisharu Foto Bukku (オトメン(乙男)オフィシャルフォトブック) (ISBN 978-4-594-06045-9).

Cast

- Masaki Okada as Asuka Masamune
  - Sara Takatsuki as young Asuka
- Kaho as Ryo Miyakozuka
  - Nanami Hinata as young Ryo
- Ryo Kimura as Hajime Tonomine
- Koji Seto as Yamato Ariake
- Kazuma Sano as Juta Tachibana
- Mirei Kiritani as Miyabi Oharida
- Tomohiro Ichikawa as Kitora Kurokawa
- Emi Takei as Kuriko Tachibana
- Kanako Yanagihara as Yumeko Hanazawa
- Nobuhiko Takada as Ryo's father
- Shingo Tsurumi as Asuka's father
- Mirai Yamamoto as Asuka's mother
- Tokimasa Tanabe as Nakajima
- Yu Sawabe as Isono Katsuo

== Reception ==
Similar to Kanno's earlier works, the series has become quite popular, scoring high on both Tohan and Oricon's weekly comic charts. The seven volumes available in Japan as of May 2009 have sold over 2.5 million copies. The series was listed as being the 3rd best-selling shōjo property, along with the 13th over-all manga property, in America for the first quarter of 2009.
