= Scott Sigler bibliography =

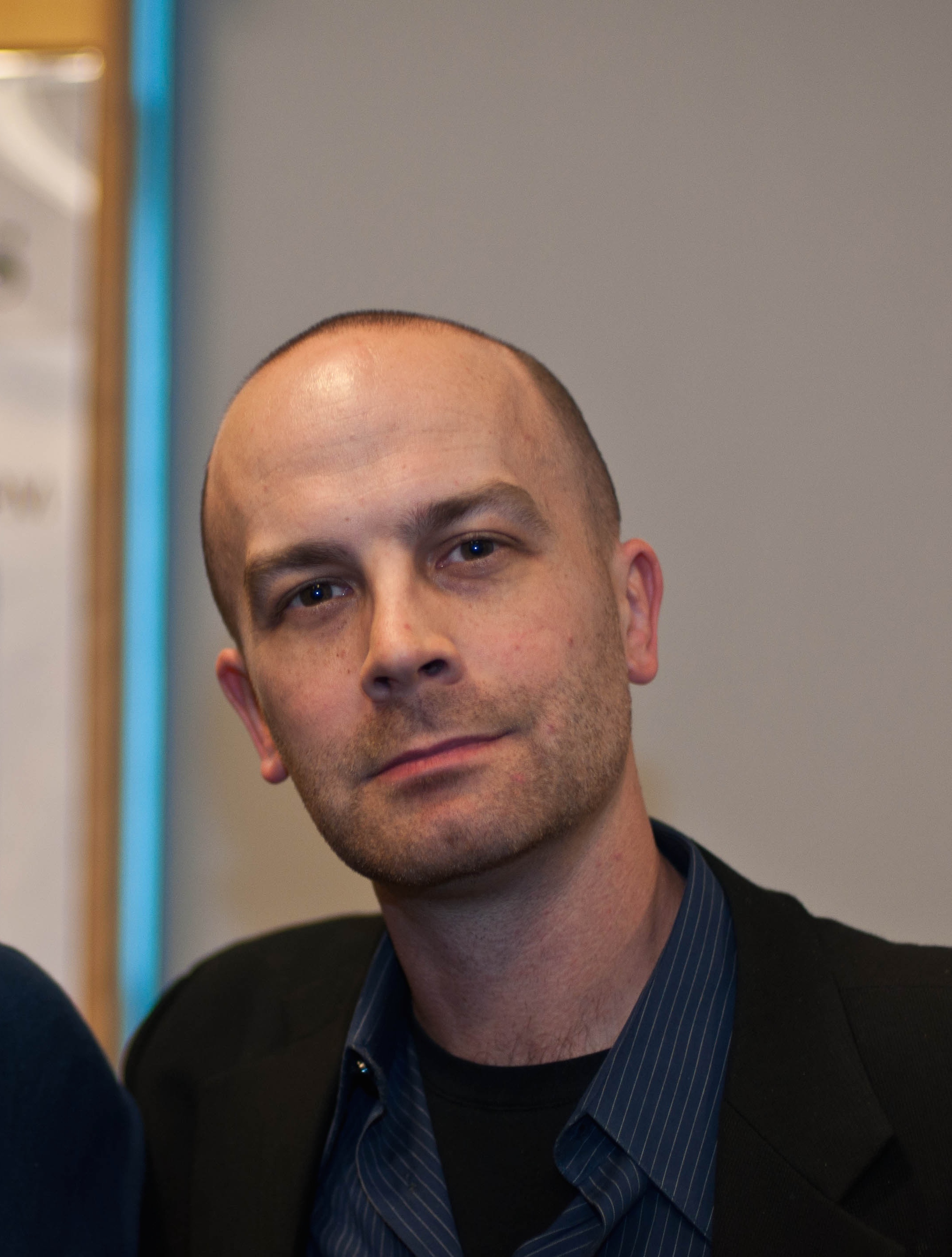
- Novels↙: 22
- Collections↙: 6
- Novellas↙: 6
- Other↙: 90

The following is a complete list of books and stories published (and some unpublished) by Scott Sigler, a New York Times #1 bestselling American author of contemporary science fiction and horror. Sigler has published 22 novels, including those in the Infected trilogy, the Galactic Football League (GFL) series, the Generations trilogy, The Crypt series, and the Slay series. He has also co-authored 6 companion novellas to his GFL series. He has written 90 short stories and other works, many of which have been compiled in book collections and anthologies.

== Bibliography ==
=== Novels ===
Year	Title	Publisher	ISBN	Narrated by	Podcast dates	Notes
2001 - 2017	EARTHCORE	iPublish - Re-write: Empty Set Entertainment (May 30, 2017)	978-0759550421 - 978-1939366979	Scott Sigler (2005) - Ray Porter (2017)	This was one of the first books to be podcast both unabridged and free in 2005. - Jun 24, 2018, to Apr 14, 2019	Sun Symbol Series Book I. Republished in 2005 by Dragon Moon Press ISBN 978-1896944326.
2007	Ancestor	Dragon Moon Press	978-1896944739	Scott Sigler (2010)	Jun 6, 2010, to Feb 13, 2011	Republished in 2010 by Crown Publishing ISBN 978-0307406330.
2008	Infected	Crown Publishing (Apr 1, 2008)	978-0307406101	Scott Sigler	Dates unknown	Infected Trilogy, Vol. I Originally titled Infection.
2008	Contagious	Crown Publishing (Dec 30, 2008)	978-0307406316	Scott Sigler	Dec 7, 2008, to May 31, 2009	Infected Trilogy, Vol. II
2009	The Rookie	Dark Overlord Press (2009)	978-0615287447	Scott Sigler (2014)	Sep 25, 2006, to Apr 24, 2007 (original adult version). Sep 5, 2009, to Oct 2, 2009 (rewritten Young Adult version).	Galactic Football League Series, Vol. I
2010	The Starter	Dark Overlord Press (Nov 30, 2010)	978-0615365428	Scott Sigler	Feb 20 to Oct 23, 2011	Galactic Football League Series, Vol. II
2011	The All-Pro	Dark Overlord Press (Sep 2, 2011)	978-0983196334	Scott Sigler	Oct 2011 to Jul 2012	Galactic Football League Series, Vol. III
2012	The MVP	Dark Overlord Press (Sep 4, 2012)	978-0983196358	Scott Sigler	Oct 15, 2012, to Jul 6, 2013	Galactic Football League Series, Vol. IV
2012	Nocturnal	Crown Publishing (Apr 3, 2012)	978-0307406347	Phil Gigante (2013)	Oct 10, 2007, to Dec 18, 2008; Jan 26, 2020, to Nov 29, 2020	
2014	Pandemic	Crown Publishing (Jan 21, 2014)	978-0307408976	Phil Gigante	Aug 28, 2016, to Jun 11, 2017	Infected Trilogy, Vol. III
2014	The Champion	Empty Set Entertainment (Sep 30, 2014)	978-1939366504	Scott Sigler	Sep 14, 2014, to Jun 18, 2015	Galactic Football League Series, Vol. V
2015	Alive	Del Rey Books (Jul 14, 2015)	978-0553393101	Emma Galvin	Jun 21 to Nov 15, 2015	Generations Trilogy, Vol. I New York Times #1 Bestseller in Young Adult E-Book category
2016	Alight	Del Rey Books (Apr 5, 2016)	978-0553393156	Emma Galvin	Mar 20 to Aug 21, 2016	Generations Trilogy, Vol. II
2017	Alone	Del Rey Books (Mar 7, 2017)	978-0553393194	AB Kovacs	Oct 15, 2017, to Jun 3, 2018	Generations Trilogy, Vol. III
2019	Kissyman & the Gentleman	Empty Set Entertainment (Apr 26, 2019)	ASIN B07R7B3QPR	Ray Porter	Various	Includes two stories: Kissyman & Screaming Jesse Dupré; Kissyman & The Gentleman
2020	Aliens: Phalanx	Titan Books (Feb 25, 2020)	978-1789094015	Bronson Pinchot	-	An official Aliens tie-in novel
2020	MOUNT FITZ ROY	Empty Set Entertainment & Audible Originals (Dec 3, 2020)	978-1939366054	Ray Porter	-	Sun Symbol Series Book II
2021	The Gangster	Empty Set Entertainment (Feb 4, 2021)	978-1939366047	Scott Sigler	Dec 6, 2020, to Sep 19, 2021	Galactic Football League Series, Vol. VI of IX
2023	The Crypt, Book One: Shakedown	Aethon Books (Oct 3, 2023)	978-1949890846	Ray Porter	-	The Crypt Series, Vol. I of V
2024	Slay	Empty Set Entertainment (May 1, 2024)	978-1939366092	Scott Sigler	Jan 1 to Sep 17, 2023	The Man In Gray Series, Vol. I of V Written with Rob Otto
2026	The Crypt, Book Two: Voidstrike	Aethon Books (Jan 27, 2026)	978-1964505251	Ray Porter	-	The Crypt Series, Vol. II of V
2026	Beasts Beyond The River	Titan Books (Sep 22, 2026)	978-1835415269	Ray Porter	A short preview appeared on Scott's podcast on Sep 27, 2026	
TBD	Slay 2: Hatchet Man	Empty Set Entertainment (TBD)		Scott Sigler	Dec 17, 2023, to Sep 8, 2024	The Man In Gray Series, Vol. II of V Written with Rob Otto
TBD	Slay 3: Easy Kill	Empty Set Entertainment (TBD)		Scott Sigler	Jan 5 to Nov 16, 2025	The Man In Gray Series, Vol. III of V Written with Rob Otto

=== Novellas ===
Year	Title	Co-author	Publisher	ASIN	Narrated by	Podcast dates	Notes
2012	The Reporter	Mur Lafferty	Empty Set Entertainment (May 15, 2012)	ASIN B0083UL2BA	Scott Sigler (2015)	Nov 22, 2015, to Feb 14, 2016	Galactic Football League Series, Novella I
2012	The Detective	Matt Wallace	Empty Set Entertainment (Oct 22, 2012)	ASIN B009VGXY5W	Scott Sigler (2015)	Aug 4 to Oct 13, 2019	Galactic Football League Series, Novella II
2012	Title Fight	Matt Wallace	Empty Set Entertainment (Nov 26, 2012)	ASIN B00AE8FCHY	Scott Sigler (2015)	Intermittently Apr 23 to Nov 15, 2009	Galactic Football League Series, Novella III
2016	The Rider	Paul E Cooley	Empty Set Entertainment (Aug 2, 2016)	ASIN B01JKLEC5I	Scott Sigler (2016)	Jun 18 to Oct 8, 2017	Galactic Football League Series, Novella IV
2019	The Reef	Matt Wallace	Empty Set Entertainment (Apr 18, 2019)	ASIN B07QY5VB31	Scott Sigler (2019)	Apr 21 to Jul 28, 2019	Galactic Football League Series, Novella V. Continuation of Title Fight.
2021	The Stone Wolves	J. C. Hutchins	Empty Set Entertainment (Sep 7, 2021)	ASIN B09FQGFXK3	Scott Sigler (2021)	Sep 26, 2021, to May 22, 2022	Galactic Football League Series, Novella VI (last novella in series). Former working titles: The Zoroastrian Guild and The Killer.

=== Collections ===
Year	Title	Publisher	ISBN	Narrated by	Podcast dates	Notes
2011	Blood Is Red	Empty Set Entertainment (May 4, 2011)	978-0983196327	Scott Sigler (2012)	July 15 to Sep 23, 2012; Sep 24 to Dec 10, 2023	The Color Series, Book 1 Originally titled BloodCast, Season One. Eight short stories: Number One With A Bullet, Red Man, Wolf, The Great Snipe Hunt, Iowa Typhoon, Sacred Cow, Hunter Hunterson & Sons, Mt. Fitzroy (first chapter)
2012	Bones Are White	Empty Set Entertainment (Mar 27, 2012)	978-0983196365	Scott Sigler, Alec Volz, Veronica Giguere, and Justin Robert Young (2013)	Jul 14 to Oct 20, 2013	The Color Series, Book 2 Originally titled BloodCast, Season Two. Nine short stories: Passenger; Bag Man; Chuckles Mulrooney, Attorney For The Damned; Hero; Eusocial Networking; Beam Up On Aisle Five; Kissyman & The Last Song; Hunter Hunterson & Sons: Home; Hunter Hunterson & Sons: The $15 Burger (script)
2019	Hunter Hunterson & Sons: War Journal Volume 1	Empty Set Entertainment (Jan 21, 2019)	ASIN B07N1618BT	Scott Sigler	Various	Three Hunter Hunterson & Sons stories: The Case Of The Methed-Out, Parole-Jumping Vampire; The Case Of The San Francisco Fairy; The Case Of The Haunted Safeway
2019	Fire Is Orange	Empty Set Entertainment (Oct 23, 2019)	ASIN B07ZJ2WD31	Scott Sigler, Ray Porter, AB Kovacs	Oct 20, 2019, to Jan 19, 2020	The Color Series, Book 3 Ten short stories: Dale & Mable; Splashing Contest; The Laundry Demon; Puppet Master; Complex God; Mr. Double M; Fifth Girl; Reunion; Pink Torpedo; Hippo
2025 (tentative)	Death Is Black	Empty Set Entertainment (TBA)	TBA	Scott Sigler	Sep 15 to Dec 29, 2024	The Color Series, Book 4 Eight short stories: Those Gaddam Cookies; Dear Diary; Victim With A Capital V; The Good Candy; The 5th Day Of Deer Camp; The 6th Day Of Deer Camp; The 7th Day Of Deer Camp; Santa No-Pants; Upcoming collection, which will then be followed with the final collection Rot Is Green
2026 (tentative)	Mix Tape	Empty Set Entertainment (TBA)	TBA	Scott Sigler	Nov 23, 2025, to Mar 22, 2026	Six short stories: Hotel California; Mr. Sandman; Hurt; Blinding Lights; I Put A Spell On You; Behind Blue Eyes

- All novels, novellas and collections have been released in both audiobook and e-book formats unless otherwise noted.

=== Other ===
Title	Type	Originally published in	Collected in	Notes
"The Monster Under The Porch"	short story		Uncollected	The first story Scott wrote, in the 1st grade.
"Tentacles, Tentacles & More Tentacles"	short story		Uncollected	Written at the age of eight when Scott was in 3rd grade. Watch Scott read it on YouTube! During the reading he said it was written when he was in 4th grade in Mrs. Reynolds class. Also podcasted on Dec 25, 2022.
"Wizard's Duel"	short story		Uncollected	Written in high school.
"Seigeshire"	short story	White Wolf Magazine, Issue 21 (Jun, 1990)	Uncollected	
"Spectrum"	game campaign	Champions Presents #1, Hero Games #418, ISBN 978-1558061231 (1991) Iron Crown Enterprises	NA	Campaign book for the Champions roleplaying game.
"Shadows Of The City"	game campaign	Hero Games #426, ISBN 978-1558061811 (1993) Iron Crown Enterprises	NA	Campaign book for the Champions roleplaying game.
"Kumite"	short story	Adventurer's Club Magazine, Issue #24, ISSN 0896-8764 (Summer, 1994) Iron Crown Enterprises	Uncollected	
"Sigurd Archdiocese: Forces Book"	game campaign	Silent Death, The Next Millennium, ISBN 978-1558062955 (Apr, 1997) Iron Crown Enterprises	NA	Campaign book for the Silent Death wargaming system.
"Splashing Contest"	short story	Flesh & Blood magazine Vol. 1 #2 (1998), and BloodCast Season One	Fire Is Orange	This was Scott's first-ever pro fiction sale. Audio narrated by Ray Porter (Oct 27, 2019).
"ASP Technocracy"	game campaign	Silent Death, The Next Millennium, ISBN 978-1558063532 (Apr, 1998) Iron Crown Enterprises	NA	Campaign book for the Silent Death wargaming system.
"Red Man"	short story	BloodCast Season One (Jul 30, 2007)	Blood Is Red	Audio narrated by Scott Sigler.
"Wolf"	short story	BloodCast Season One	Blood Is Red	Audio narrated by Scott Sigler.
"Iowa Typhoon"	short story	BloodCast Season One (Jul 22, 2007)	Blood Is Red	Audio narrated by Scott Sigler.
"The Great Snipe Hunt"	short story	BloodCast Season One (May 31, 2007)	Blood Is Red	Audio narrated by Scott Sigler.
"Sacred Cow"	short story	BloodCast Season One (Sep 19, 2006)	Blood Is Red	Audio narrated by Scott Sigler.
"Number One With A Bullet"	short story	Monsters From Memphis anthology, ISBN 978-1880964217 (1997), and BloodCast Season One	Blood Is Red	Audio narrated by Scott Sigler.
"Mt. Fitzroy (1st chapter)"	short story	BloodCast Season One	Blood Is Red	Audio narrated by Scott Sigler.
"Hunter Hunterson & Sons: The Case Of The Methed-Out, Parole-Jumping Vampire"	short story		Blood Is Red and Hunter Hunterson & Sons: War Journal Volume 1	Audio narrated by Scott Sigler. Originally titled just Hunter Hunterson & Sons.
"Kissyman & The Last Song"	short story	BloodCast Season Two (2007)	Bones Are White	Audio narrated by Scott Sigler.
"Kissyman"	short story		Uncollected	
"Kissyman & The Gentleman"	short story		Kissyman & The Gentleman	
"Kissyman & Screamin' Jesse Dupre"	short story		Kissyman & The Gentleman	
"Chuckles Mulrooney, Attorney For The Damned"	short story	Escape Pod, Episode 57, narrated by Preston Buttons (Jun 8, 2006)	Bones Are White	Audio narrated by Alec Volz.
"Beam Up On Aisle Five"	short story		Bones Are White	Audio narrated by Justin Robert Young.
"Eusocial Networking"	short story	7th Son: Obsidian (2008)	Bones Are White	Audio narrated by Veronica Giguere.
"Passenger"	short story	BloodCast Season One (Aug 29, 2007)	Bones Are White	Audio narrated by Alec Volz.
"Hero"	short story	Escape Pod, Episode 35, narrated by Stephen Eley (Jan 5, 2006)	Bones Are White	Audio narrated by Scott Sigler.
"Bag Man"	short story	Pseudopod podcast, Episode 1 (2006), and BloodCast Season Two	Bones Are White	Audio narrated by Alec Volz or Justin Robert Young?
"You're A Damned Fool, Charlie Brown"	short story	BloodCast Season Two (2007)?	Uncollected	
"The Pink Torpedo"	short story	Podcast (date unknown)	Uncollected	
"The Crypt, Book One: The Crew"	novella	Podcast over the period Mar 12, 2008 to May 31, 2010.	Uncollected	Audio narrated by Scott Sigler.
"The Crypt, Book Two: Shakedown"	novella	Podcast aired Jan 10–24, 2010.	Uncollected	Audio narrated by Scott Sigler. Teaser?
"Hunter Hunterson & Sons: The Case Of The San Francisco Fairy"	short story		Bones Are White and Hunter Hunterson & Sons: War Journal Volume 1	Audio narrated by Scott Sigler. Originally titled Hunter Hunterson & Sons: Home.
"Hunter Hunterson & Sons: The $15 Burger (script)"	short story	SiglerFest 2011 at Balticon 45 (May 27, 2011)	Bones Are White	Audio narrated live by Scott Sigler and fans.
"Chocolate Zombies"	short story	Balticon 46 (May 26, 2012). Also podcast on Dec 18, 2022.	Uncollected	Audio narrated live by Scott Sigler. included in Free WiFi On Mars.
"Infected"	graphic novel	IDW Publishing (Aug 1, 2012)	Uncollected	Put on hold after only first issue.
"A Girl With Excellent Taste In Music"	short story	Scott Sigler website (Aug 21, 2013)	Uncollected	Not released as audiobook.
"The Fifth Day Of Deer Camp"	short story	The End Is Nigh, anthology ISBN 978-1495471179 (Mar 1, 2014) CreateSpace Independent Publishing Platform	Death Is Black	The Apocalypse Triptych, Book 1 Audio narrated by Scott Sigler.
"Hunter Hunterson & Sons: The Case Of The Haunted Safeway"	short story	Games Creatures Play, anthology ISBN 978-0425256879 (Apr 1, 2014) Ace Hardcover Publishing	Hunter Hunterson & Sons: War Journal Volume 1	Original audio narrated by Todd Haberkorn. Podcast narrated by Scott Sigler. Podcast first aired from Feb 21 to Mar 13, 2016.
"Complex God"	novelette	Robot Uprisings, anthology ISBN 978-0345803634 (Apr 8, 2014) Vintage Publishing. Fire Is Orange (Nov 10, 2019) Empty Set Entertainment	Fire Is Orange	2014 audio narrated by Emily Beresford. 2019 audio narrated by Scott Sigler.
"Happy Company"	short story	Wattpad (May 30, 2014)	Uncollected	Ongoing story, last updated Jul 10, 2014. So far two parts: "Mamma" and "Brink"
"Nosferatu, Brutus?"	short story	HELP FUND MY ROBOT ARMY!!! & Other Improbable Crowdfunding Projects, anthology (Jun 30, 2014) John Joseph Adams Publishing	Uncollected	Not released as audiobook.
"The Sixth Day Of Deer Camp"	short story	The End Is Now, anthology ISBN 978-1497484375 (Sep 1, 2014) CreateSpace Independent Publishing Platform	Death Is Black	The Apocalypse Triptych, Book 2 Audio narrated by Scott Sigler.
"The Hippo"	short story	V-Wars: Blood And Fire, anthology ISBN 978-1631400278 (Nov 4, 2014) IDW Publishing	Uncollected	A Chronicle Of The Vampire Wars, Vol. 2 Audio narrated by Stephen Hoye.
"The Seventh Day Of Deer Camp"	short story	The End Has Come, anthology ISBN 978-1497484405 (May 1, 2015) CreateSpace Independent Publishing Platform	Death Is Black	The Apocalypse Triptych, Book 3 Audio narrated by Alex Hyde-White.
"The Hippo II"	short story	V-Wars: Night Terrors, anthology ISBN 978-1631402722 (Oct 6, 2015) IDW Publishing	Uncollected	A Chronicle Of The Vampire Wars, Vol. 3 Audio narrated by Stephen Hoye & Jamye Grant.
"Mr. Double M"	short story	The PAULANDSTORMONOMICON: An Anthology, edited by Paul and Storm (Jul 8, 2016) Paul and Storm, LLC	Uncollected	Not released as audiobook.
"Those Gaddam Cookies"	short story	What The #@&% Is That: The Saga Anthology Of The Monstrous And Macabre, ISBN 978-1481434997 (Nov 1, 2016) Saga Press	Death Is Black	Not released as audiobook.
"Victim With A Capital V"	short story	Unfettered II, anthology edited by Shawn Speakman, ISBN 978-1944145088 (Nov 21, 2016) Grim Oak Press	Death Is Black	Audio narrated by Unknown.
"Public Domain"	short story	Chasing Shadows: Visions Of Our Coming Transparent World, anthology edited by David Brin & Stephen W. Potts, ISBN 978-0765382580 (Jan 10, 2017) Tor Books	Uncollected	Not released as audiobook.
"Dangerous Prey"	short story	Aliens: Bug Hunt, anthology announced and edited by Jonathan Maberry ISBN 978-1785654442 (Apr 18, 2017) Titan Books	Uncollected	Audio narrated by Unknown.
"Dear Diary"	short story	Dark Cities, anthology edited by Christopher Golden, ISBN 978-1785652660 (May 16, 2017) Titan Books	Death Is Black	Not released as audiobook.
"Lady And The Wolf"	short story	MECH: Age Of Steel anthology, ISBN 978-1941987858 (Jun 20, 2017) Ragnarok Publications	Uncollected	Kickstarter campaign successfully funded on May 14, 2016. Not released as audiobook.
"Hunter Hunterson & Sons: The Case Of The Rabid Unicorn"	short story	First read live at SiglerFest 2K17 (Oct 6, 2017) Empty Set Entertainment	Uncollected	Audio narrated by Scott Sigler.
"Vacation"	short story	Joe Ledger: Unstoppable, anthology edited by Jonathan Maberry and Bryan Thomas Schmidt, ISBN 978-1250090805 (Oct 31, 2017) St. Martin's Griffin	Uncollected	Audio narrated by Ray Porter. First podcast Jun 10–17, 2018.
"Kissyman And The Succubus"	short story	Hardboiled Horror, anthology edited by Jonathan Maberry, ISBN 978-1947654020 (Nov 24, 2017) JournalStone	Uncollected	Audio narrated by Dan John Miller.
"Hunter Hunterson And The President Of Hell"	short story	The Demons Of King Solomon, edited by Aaron J. French, ISBN 978-1947654143 (Dec 15, 2017) JournalStone	Uncollected	Not released as audiobook.
"Throwdown"	short story	Unfettered III, anthology edited by Shawn Speakman, ISBN 978-1944145231 (Mar 19, 2019) Grim Oak Press	Uncollected	Sequel to "Victim With A Capital V". Audio narrated by Unknown.
"The Last Child"	short story	Wastelands: The New Apocalypse, anthology edited by John Joseph Adams, ISBN 978-1785658952 (Jun 4, 2019) Titan Books	Uncollected	Audio narrated by Christopher Carley.
"The Final Blow"	short story	Lightspeed Magazine, Issue 111 (Jul 31, 2019) John Joseph Adams	Uncollected	Not released as audiobook.
"Dale & Mable"	short story	Fire Is Orange podcast (Oct 20, 2019) Empty Set Entertainment	Fire Is Orange	Audio narrated by Ray Porter.
"The Laundry Demon"	short story	Fire Is Orange podcast (Nov 3, 2019) Empty Set Entertainment	Fire Is Orange	Audio narrated by AB Kovacs.
"Puppet Master"	short story	Fire Is Orange podcast (Nov 3, 2019) Empty Set Entertainment	Fire Is Orange	Audio narrated by AB Kovacs.
"The Love"	short story	Ignorance Is Strength, anthology edited by John Joseph Adams, Christie Yant and Hugh Howey, ISBN 978-1796549591 (Jun 30, 2020) Independently published	Uncollected	The Dystopia Triptych, Book 1 Part I of Scott's “V. Invadens” short-story trilogy. Audio narrated by Unknown.
"The Hate"	short story	Burn The Ashes, anthology edited by John Joseph Adams, Christie Yant and Hugh Howey, ISBN 978-1796549522 (Jun 30, 2020) Independently published	Uncollected	The Dystopia Triptych, Book 2 Part II of Scott's “V. Invadens” short-story trilogy. Audio narrated by Unknown.
"The Sadness & Joy"	short story	Or Else The Light, anthology edited by John Joseph Adams, Christie Yant and Hugh Howey, ISBN 978-1796549652 (Jun 30, 2020) Independently published	Uncollected	The Dystopia Triptych, Book 3 Part III of Scott's “V. Invadens” short-story trilogy. Audio narrated by Unknown.
"Broken Glass"	short story	First read live during SIGLERinPLACE (Aug 6, 2020) Empty Set Entertainment	Uncollected	Audio narrated by Scott Sigler.
"Another Mother"	short story	Aliens vs. Predators: Ultimate Prey, anthology edited by Jonathan Maberry and Bryan Thomas Schmidt, ISBN 978-1789097948 (Dec 14, 2021) Titan Books	Uncollected	Epilogue for Aliens: Phalanx. Audio narrated by Unknown.
"Dead Man's Switch"	short story	Predator: Eyes Of The Demon, anthology edited by Bryan Thomas Schmidt, ISBN 978-1803360294 (Aug 9, 2022) Titan Books	Uncollected	Audio narrated by Unknown.
"A Glow In The Dark"	short story	The Hitherto Secret Experiments Of Marie Curie, anthology edited by Bryan Thomas Schmidt and Henry Herz, ISBN 978-1665047036 (Apr 11, 2023) Blackstone Publishing, Inc.	Uncollected	Audio narrated by Unknown.
"Plants And Animals"	short story	Double Trouble: An Anthology Of Two-Fisted Team-Ups, anthology edited by Jonathan Maberry and Keith R.A. DeCandido, ISBN 978-1736252437 (May 31, 2023)	Uncollected	Not released as audiobook.
"The Third Guy"	short story	Weird Tales: 100 Years Of Weird, anthology edited by Jonathan Maberry, ISBN 979-8200687992 (Oct 10, 2023) Blackstone Publishing, Inc.	Uncollected	Audio narrated by Unknown.
"Druden"	dramatization	ISBN 979-8890550385 (Oct 31, 2023) Graphic Audio LLC	Uncollected	Adapted from the screenplay written by Scott Sigler with Adrian Picardi. Scott Sigler portrays Lt. Col. John Maberry, the battalion commanding officer.
"Little Murder Machine"	short story	Joe Ledger: Unbreakable, anthology edited by Jonathan Maberry and Bryan Thomas Schmidt, ISBN 978-1685100889 (Nov 10, 2023)	Uncollected	Audio narrated by Ray Porter.
"Simple Silas"	short story	The Good, The Bad, And The Uncanny: Tales Of A Very Weird West, anthology edited by Jonathan Maberry, ISBN 978-1954255685 (Dec 19, 2023) Outland Entertainment	Uncollected	Audio narrated by Unknown.
"Versus"	film script	Table Read podcast (Oct 8-30, 2024)	Uncollected	Audio performed by Table Read cast, including Scott Sigler as Mr Jones.
"The Good Candy"	short story	Death Is Black podcast (Oct 27, 2024) Empty Set Entertainment	Death Is Black	Audio narrated by Scott Sigler.
"Santa No-Pants"	short story	Death Is Black podcast (Dec 15, 2024) Empty Set Entertainment	Death Is Black	Audio narrated by Scott Sigler.
"Svart Hünd"	short story	Combat Monsters: Untold Tales of World War II, anthology edited by Henry Herz, ISBN 979-8874748432 (Feb 11, 2025) Blackstone Publishing, Inc.	Uncollected	Audio narrated by Unknown.
"Rainy Day"	short story	DREAD COAST: SoCal Horror Tales, upcoming charity anthology edited by Dennis K. Crosby and KC Grifant (Date TBA) No Bad Books Press. A portion of the proceeds will benefit individuals and families directly impacted by the LA wildfires. First aired on Scott's podcast on May 4, 2025.	Uncollected	Audio narrated by Scott Sigler.
"In Memorium"	short story	Weird Tales #371 - The Undead Issue, anthology edited by Jonathan Maberry, ISBN 979-8228577541 (Jul 15, 2025) Blackstone Publishing, Inc.	Uncollected	Audio narrated by Unknown.
"Hotel California"	short story	Mix Tape podcast (Nov 23, 2025) Empty Set Entertainment	Uncollected	Audio narrated by Scott Sigler.
"Mr. Sandman"	short story	Mix Tape podcast (Nov 30 to Dec 7, 2025) Empty Set Entertainment	Uncollected	Audio narrated by Scott Sigler.
"Hurt"	short story	Mix Tape podcast (Dec 14-28, 2025) Empty Set Entertainment	Uncollected	Audio narrated by Scott Sigler.
"Blinding Lights"	short story	Mix Tape podcast (Jan 11-25, 2026) Empty Set Entertainment	Uncollected	Audio narrated by Scott Sigler.
"Meet-up"	short story	Weird Tales #372 - Cryptids & Urban Legends ASIN B0G1LC7GZW (Jan 13, 2026) Blackstone Publishing, Inc.	Uncollected	Audio narrated by Unknown.
"I Put A Spell On You"	short story	Mix Tape podcast (Feb 8-15, 2026) Empty Set Entertainment	Uncollected	Audio narrated by Scott Sigler.
"Behind Blue Eyes"	short story	Mix Tape podcast (Feb 22 to Mar 22, 2026) Empty Set Entertainment	Uncollected	Audio narrated by Scott Sigler.
"Kaiju Poo-Poo"	short story	The Big Bad Book Of Kaiju, anthology edited by Jonathan Maberry and Henry Herz, ISBN 978-1835417515 (Sep 22, 2026) Titan Books	Uncollected	Audio narrated by Unknown.
"Blood On The Jungle Gym"	short story	Unbroken, anthology edited by Shawn Speakman and Peter Orullian, (TBA) Grim Oak Press	Uncollected	Set in the Slay universe. Audio narrated by Travis Baldree.
