= Kepler-22b =

Mini-Neptune exoplanet orbiting Kepler-22

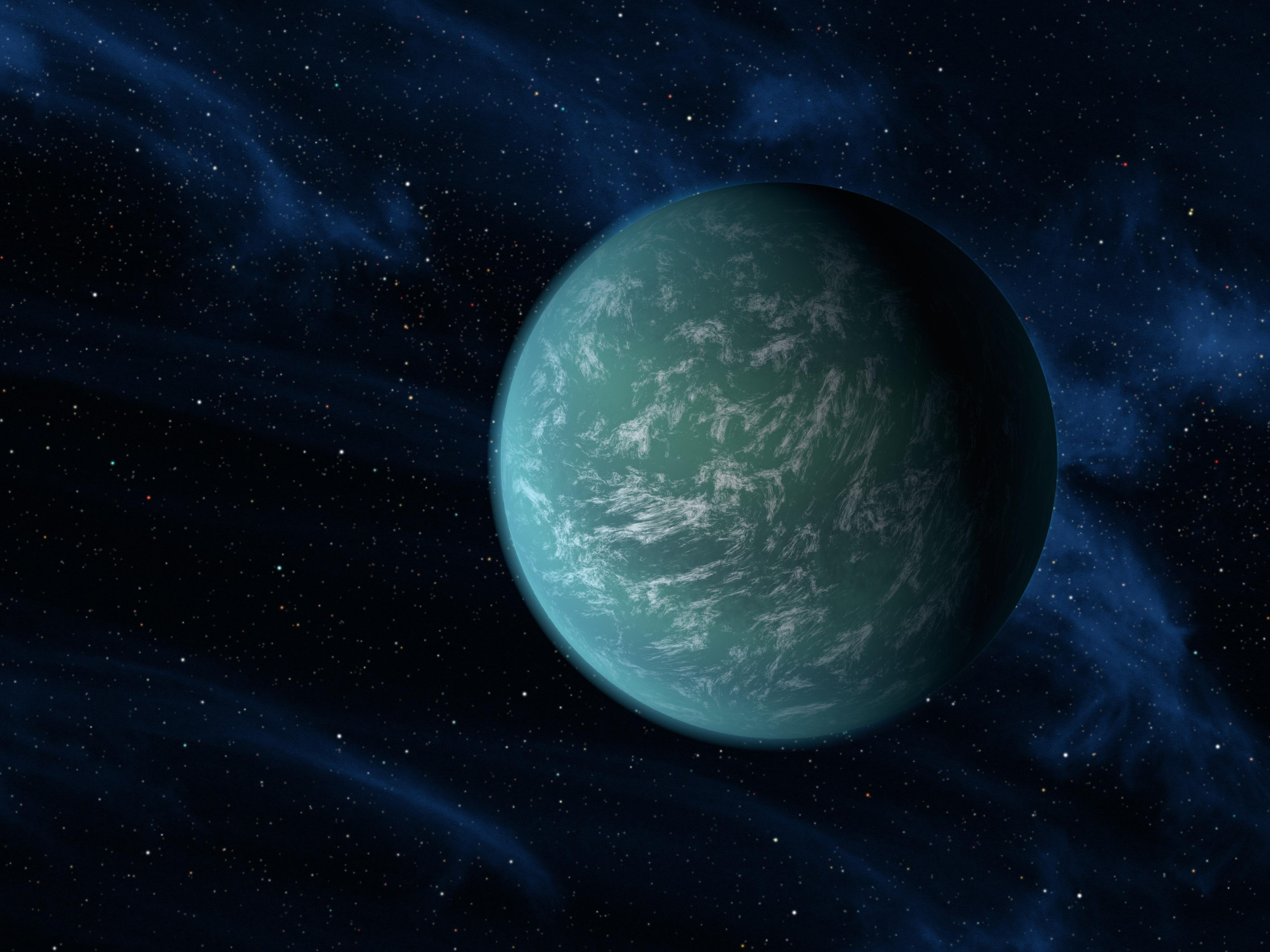
- Artist's conception of Kepler-22b as a rocky planet

Discovery
- Discovered by: Kepler Science Team
- Discovery site: Kepler telescope
- Discovery date: 5 December 2011
- Detection method: Transit

Orbital characteristics
- Semi-major axis: 0.812+0.011 −0.013 AU
- Eccentricity: 0 (<0.72)
- Orbital period (sidereal): 289.863876±0.000013 d
- Inclination: 89.764°+0.025° −0.042°
- Time of periastron: 2454966.7001±0.0068
- Semi-amplitude: <1.6 m/s
- Star: Kepler-22

Physical characteristics
- Mean radius: 2.10±0.12 R_{🜨}
- Mass: <9.1 M_{🜨}
- Mean density: <5.2 g/cm^{3}
- Temperature: 279±4 K (6 °C; 43 °F, equilibrium)

Kepler-22b (also known by its Kepler object of interest designation KOI-087.01) is an exoplanet orbiting the Sun-like star Kepler-22 within its habitable zone. It is located about 640 light-years (200 parsecs) from Earth in the constellation Cygnus. Discovered by NASA's Kepler space telescope, it was announced on 5 December 2011 as the first known transiting planet to orbit within the habitable zone of a Sun-like star, where conditions could allow liquid water to exist on the surface.

Kepler-22b has a radius about twice that of Earth. Its mass and surface composition are unknown, but an Earth-like composition is considered unlikely. It may instead be an ocean planet or have a volatile-rich composition with a liquid or gaseous outer layer. The planet's known orbital parameters are its orbital period, about 290 days, and its inclination, approximately 90°. Its surface temperature may be moderate if it does not experience extreme greenhouse heating. In the absence of an atmosphere, its equilibrium temperature, assuming an Earth-like albedo, would be about 279 K (6 °C; 43 °F), slightly higher than Earth's equilibrium temperature of 255 K (−18 °C; −1 °F).

== Physical characteristics ==
=== Mass, radius, and temperature ===
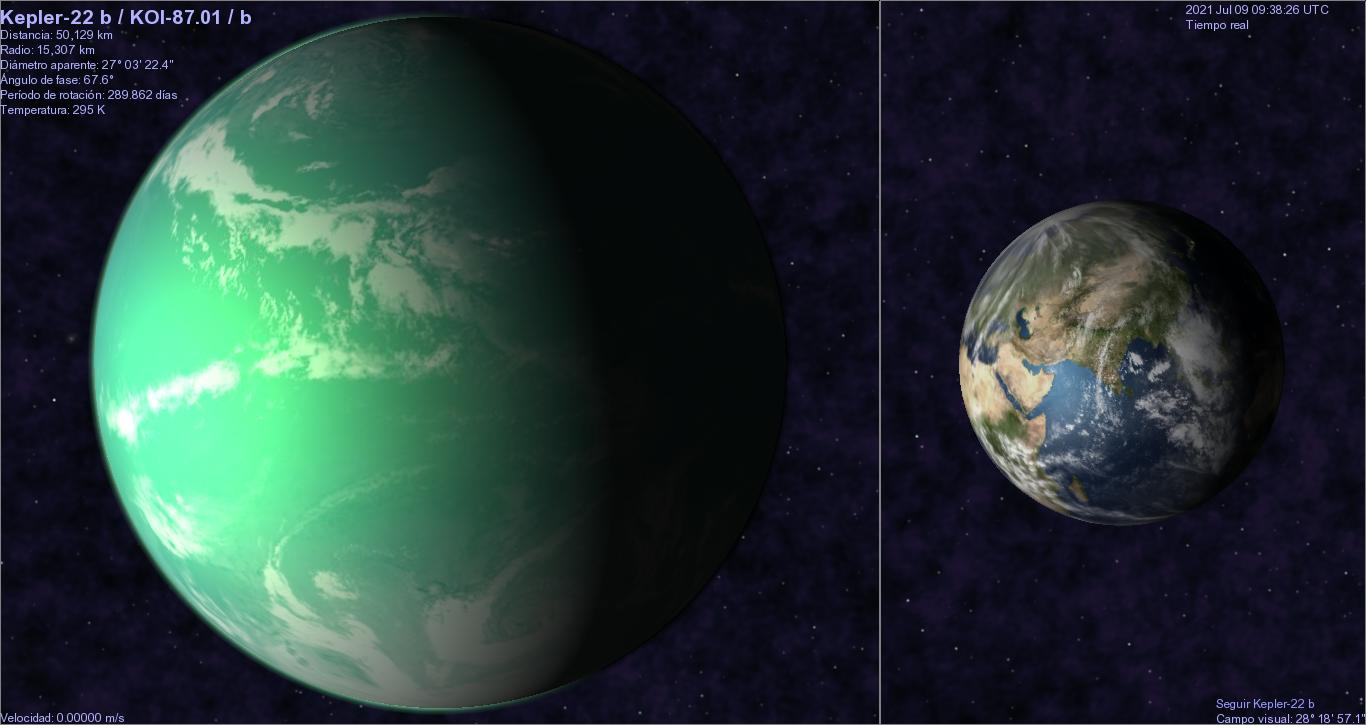
Size comparison of Kepler-22b (artistic simulation) with Earth, rendered in Celestia

Kepler-22b's radius was initially thought to be 2.4 times that of Earth, but has since been revised to 2.1 R_{🜨} as of 2023. Its mass and surface composition remain unknown, with only some rough estimates established: at the time of the discovery announcement, it was known to have fewer than 124 Earth masses at the 3-sigma confidence limit, and fewer than 36 Earth masses at 1-sigma confidence. The adopted model in Kipping et al. (2013) does not reliably detect the mass (the upper limit is 52.8 M_{🜨}). As of 2023, the upper limit has been constrained to at most 9.1 M_{🜨}.

Kepler-22b, dubbed by scientists as a "water world", might be an "ocean-like" planet. It might also be comparable to the water-rich planet Enaiposha although Kepler-22b, unlike Enaiposha, is in the habitable zone. An Earth-like composition is ruled out to at least 1-sigma uncertainty by radial velocity measurements of the system; it is thus likely to have a more volatile-rich composition with a liquid or gaseous outer shell; this would make it similar to Kepler-11f, one of the smallest known gas planets. Natalie Batalha, one of the scientists on the Kepler Space Telescope project, has speculated, "If it is mostly ocean with a small rocky core, it's not beyond the realm of possibility that life could exist in such an ocean". This possibility has spurred SETI to perform research on top candidates for extraterrestrial life.

In the absence of an atmosphere, its equilibrium temperature (assuming an Earth-like albedo) would be approximately 279 K (6 °C), compared with Earth's 255 K (−18 °C).

=== Host star ===
The host star, Kepler-22, is a G-type star that is 3% less massive than the Sun and 2% smaller in volume. It has a surface temperature of 5,518 K (5,245 °C; 9,473 °F) compared with the Sun, which has a surface temperature of 5,778 K (5,505 °C; 9,941 °F). The star is about 4 billion years old. In comparison, the Sun is 4.6 billion years old.

The apparent magnitude of Kepler-22 is 11.5, which means it is too dim to be seen with the naked eye.

=== Orbit ===
The only parameters of the planet's orbit that are currently available are its orbital period, which is about 290 days, and its inclination, which is approximately 90°. From Earth, the planet appears to make a transit across the disk of its host star. In order to obtain further information about the details of the planet's orbit, other methods of planetary detection, such as the radial velocity method, need to be used. While such methods have been performed on the planet since its discovery, these methods have not yet detected an accurate value for the eccentricity of the planet and so (as of 2023) only an upper limit for the eccentricity of the planet has been set by astronomers.

== Habitability ==
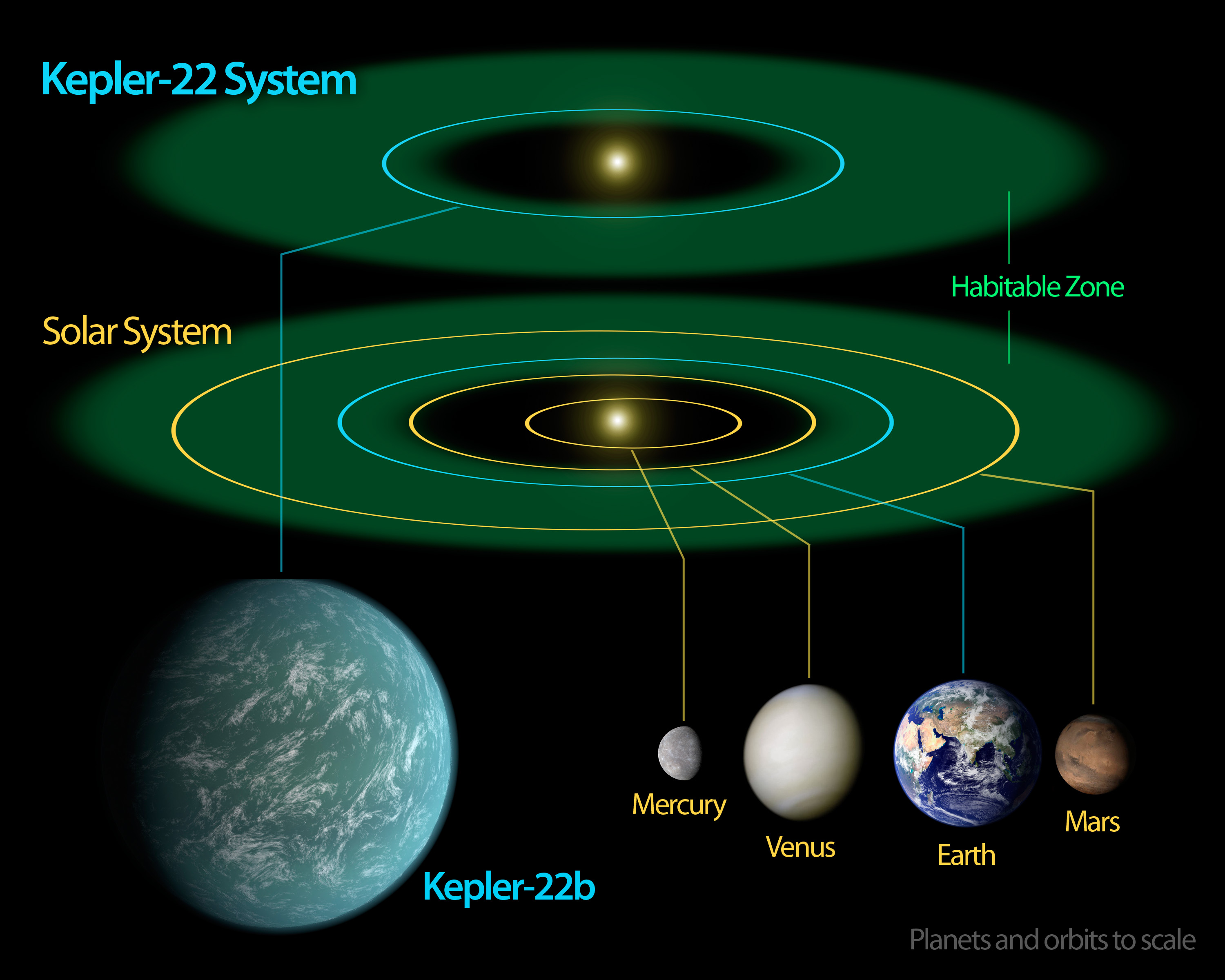
Artist's impression of the Kepler-22 system and its planet (sizes to scale) compared to the planets of the inner Solar System with their respective habitable zones

The average distance from Kepler-22b to its host star Kepler-22 is about 15% less than the distance from Earth to the Sun but the luminosity (light output) of Kepler-22 is about 25% less than that of the Sun. This combination of a shorter average distance from the star and a lower stellar luminosity are consistent with a moderate surface temperature at that distance, if it is assumed that the surface is not subject to extreme greenhouse heating.

If Kepler-22b moves in a highly elliptical orbit, its surface temperature variance will be very high.

=== Climate ===
Scientists can estimate the possible surface conditions as follows:

- In the absence of an atmosphere, its equilibrium temperature (assuming an Earth-like albedo) would be approximately 279 K (6 °C), compared to Earth's 255 K (−18 °C).
- If the atmosphere provides a greenhouse effect similar in magnitude to the one on Earth, it would have an average surface temperature of 295 K (22 °C).
- If the atmosphere has a greenhouse effect similar in magnitude to the one on Venus, it would have an average surface temperature of 733 K (460 °C).

Recent estimates suggest that Kepler-22b has more than a 95% probability of being located in the empirical habitable zone defined by the recent Venus and early Mars limits (based on estimates of when these planets may have supported habitable conditions), but less than a 5% chance of being located in the conservative habitable zone within the Circumstellar habitable zone, (estimated from a 1D cloud-free radiative-convective model).

=== Limits on satellites ===
The Hunt for Exomoons with Kepler (HEK) project has studied the Kepler photometry of the planet, to find any evidence of transit timing and duration variations that may be caused by an orbiting satellite. Such variations were not found, ruling out the existence of any satellites of Kepler-22b with a mass greater than 0.54 Earth masses.

== Discovery and observation ==
The planet's first transit in front of its host star was observed on Kepler's third day of scientific operations, on 12 May 2009. The third transit was detected on 15 December 2010. Additional confirmation data was provided by the Spitzer Space Telescope and ground-based observations. Confirmation of the existence of Kepler-22b was announced on 5 December 2011.

=== Past transit dates ===
Transits of Kepler-22b
Date(s) of transit	Time (UTC)			Notes
Date(s) of transit	Start	Mid	End	Notes
15 May 2009				First observed transit by Kepler space telescope
1 March 2010				Observed by Spitzer
15 December 2010				3rd transit observed by Kepler
1 October 2011				7.4 hour transit observed by Spitzer space telescope, confirming the planet

== Appearances in media ==
- Kepler-22b is used as:
  - A plot device for the 2012 teen science fiction novel Kepler 22b by Bangladeshi author Muhammad Zafar Iqbal.
  - A map in Łukasz Jakowski's video games Age of Civilizations (2014) and Age of History II (2017, known as Age of Civilizations 2 until 2020). In AoH2, there are 404 provinces that players must control to win the game.
  - The setting for the 2019 children's science fiction book series Kepler by Sri Lankan author Binendra.
  - The setting for the 2020 U.S. TV series Raised by Wolves, which was filmed using South Africa as a substitute for the planet.
  - The title of a song on Omnium Gatherum, the 20th studio album by King Gizzard & the Lizard Wizard.
  - The source of a radio signal in Pluribus, which contains a recipe for a ribonucleic acid (RNA) sequence.
  - The destination of the faster-than-light starship Stalwart II from Scott Sigler's short story The Sadness & Joy collected in The Apocalypse Triptych edited by John Joseph Adams and Hugh Howey.

== See also ==
- Earth analog
- Gliese 163 c
- Gliese 581d
- Gliese 581g
- Gliese 667 Cc
- Kepler-452b
- Kepler-62f
- Kepler-1229b
- HD 85512 b
- Kepler-69c
- Kepler-186f
- PH2
- Planetary habitability
