= Infected (2008 film) =

- Screenplay by: Joshua Hale Fialkov; Christian Ford; Mark Wheaton; Roger Soffer
- Story by: Thomas Schnauz
- Directed by: Adam Weissman
- Starring: Maxim Roy; Gil Bellows; Isabella Rossellini
- Theme music composer: Ned Bouhalassa
- Country of origin: Canada
- Original language: English

Production
- Producer: François Sylvestre
- Cinematography: Daniel Villeneuve
- Editor: Benjamin Duffield
- Running time: 90 minutes
- Production companies: Muse Entertainment Enterprises; Sci Fi Channel

Original release
- Network: Sci Fi Channel
- Release: 27 April 2008

Infected is a 2008 Canadian made-for-television Action adventure science-fiction horror-thriller film, which was directed by Adam Weissman. The movie has been given extremely negative reviews by critics and criticized by local television viewers for its B-movie/Z-movie-style elements and low-grade cinematography, extremely cheap budget, lack of coherence, and fast-paced and improper storytelling. The film however, has developed a strong cult following among Google users who have seen the film. The film received an R-rating from the MPAA before its scheduled release in the United States in 2009.

== Cast ==
- Gil Bellows as Ben
- Maxim Roy as Lisa
- Glenda Braganza as Connie
- Mark Camacho as Craig Braddock
- Bruce Dinsmore as Peter Whitefield
- Carlo Mestroni as Captain Wimmer
- Neil Napier as Taylor Lambert
- Judd Nelson as Malcolm Burgess
- Donny Quinn as Obsequious Assistant (as Donny Falsetti)
- Isabella Rossellini as Carla Plume
- David Schaap as Lowe
- Jesse Todd as Knutt Jourgensen

== Production ==
The project was filmed in Montreal, Quebec, Canada under the working title The Hatching. The title was later changed to Infected, however this caused problems. A novel by writer Scott Sigler, with the same name Infected, had to have its book title changed to Infested, in order to prevent confusion, and a false copyright infringement/plagiarism penalty.

== Release ==
It aired on 27 April 2008 on the SciFi channel. Genius Productions and Rhi Entertainment released the film Direct-to-DVD and VOD on 19 May 2009 in the United States. The film later received a limited online streaming release on Netflix, in 2011 and was given moderately positive reviews.

== Soundtrack ==
Ned Bouhalassa composed the score and worked on the Soundtrack with drummer Christian Olsen.
