= Eleanor Brown =

American novelist (born 1973)

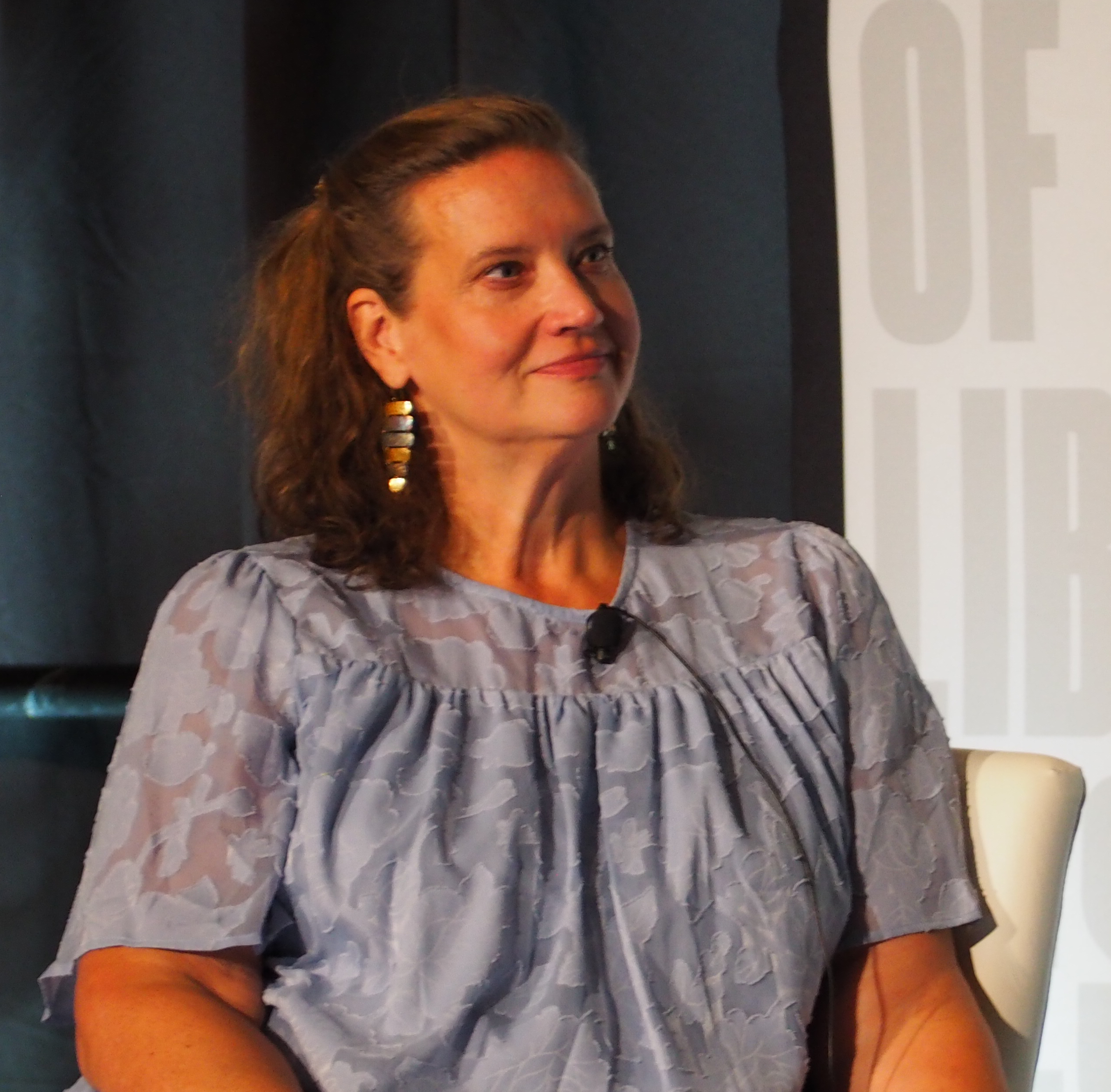
- Brown in 2022
- Born: 1973 (age 52–53); Washington, D.C., U.S.
- Education: M.A. in Literature
- Occupation: Writer
- Partner: J. C. Hutchins
- Writing career
- Genres: Literary fiction Historical fiction Women's fiction
- Notable works: The Weird Sisters; The Light of Paris
- Website: eleanor-brown.com

Eleanor Brown (born 1973) is an American novelist, anthologist, editor, educator, and speaker. She is the New York Times and international bestselling author of novels The Weird Sisters and The Light of Paris.

== Early life ==
Brown was born in 1973, in Washington, D.C., the youngest of three sisters. She has lived in Minnesota, San Francisco, Philadelphia, Florida, and England. She resides with her partner, novelist J. C. Hutchins, in Highlands Ranch, Colorado.

== Career ==
Brown teaches writing workshops and conferences nationwide, including for The Writers' Table and Lighthouse Writers workshops in Colorado. Brown also participates in CrossFit and is a contributor for CrossFit Journal.

Brown's first novel, The Weird Sisters, tells the story of the three Andreas sisters, who have widely different personalities. They reunite at their home in the rural town of Barnwell, Ohio, after their mother is diagnosed with breast cancer. Their father, an English professor with a passion for all things William Shakespeare, named his three daughters after Shakespeare heroines: Rosalind (aka Rose), Cordelia (aka Cordy), and Bianca (aka Bean). The novel's title, The Weird Sisters, alludes to the three witches (often referred to as "the weird sisters") that serve as the introduction to the Shakespearean tragedy Macbeth. Brown's debut novel is written in the first-person collective through the perspectives of each of the Andreas sisters.

Like The Weird Sisters, Brown's follow-up novel, The Light of Paris, explores themes like success, failure, and identity. The Light of Paris is about a woman named Madeleine in the 1990s discovering the secrets of "the stodgy grandmother she barely knew" and the exciting life she lived in Paris during the 1920s. The story shifts between the experiences of Madeleine in her present life and those of her grandmother Margie from the past.

== Bibliography ==
=== Novels ===
- The Weird Sisters (January 20, 2011)
- The Light of Paris (July 12, 2016)
- Any Other Family, (2022)

=== Anthology ===
- A Paris All Your Own: Bestselling Women Writers on the City of Light (July 4, 2017)

=== Nonfiction ===
- WOD Motivation: Quotes, Inspiration, Affirmations, and Wisdom to Stay Mentally Tough (November 1, 2013)
