= Kepler-22 =

Star in the constellation Cygnus

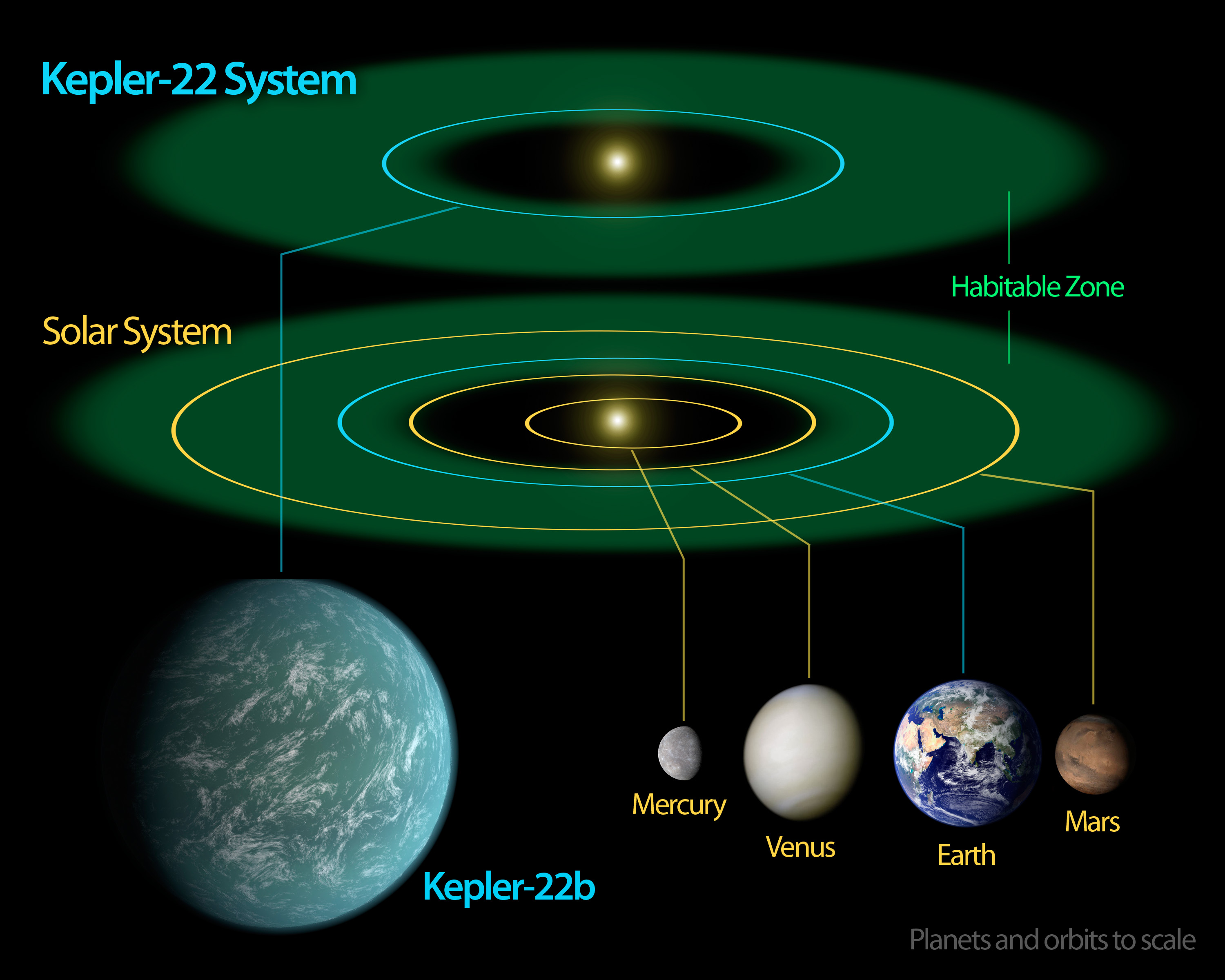
- This diagram compares the Solar System to Kepler-22 (Kepler-22b is displayed by an artist's depiction)

Observation data Epoch J2000 Equinox ICRS
- Constellation: Cygnus
- Right ascension: 19^{h} 16^{m} 52.19023^{s}
- Declination: +47° 53′ 03.9486″
- Apparent magnitude (V): 11.664

Characteristics
- Evolutionary stage: main sequence
- Spectral type: G5V

Astrometry
| Radial velocity (R_{v}) | −4.50±0.51 km/s |
| Proper motion (μ) | RA: −39.589 mas/yr Dec.: −66.773 mas/yr |
| Parallax (π) | 5.0627±0.0110 mas |
| Distance | 644 ± 1 ly (197.5 ± 0.4 pc) |
| Absolute magnitude (M_{V}) | ~5.27 |
| Absolute bolometric magnitude (M_{bol}) | ~4.98 |

Details
| Mass | 0.857+0.051 −0.043 M_{☉} |
| Radius | 0.869±0.011 R_{☉} |
| Luminosity (bolometric) | 0.79 ± 0.04 L_{☉} |
| Luminosity (visual, L_{V}) | ~0.67 L_{☉} |
| Temperature | 5596±61 K |
| Metallicity [Fe/H] | −0.255±0.065 dex |
| Rotational velocity (v sin i) | 0.6 ± 1.0 km/s |
| Age | 7.0+4.0 −4.2 Gyr |

Other designations
- KOI-87, KIC 10593626, GSC 03546-02301, 2MASS J19165219+4753040, Gaia DR2 2127941757262806656

Database references
| SIMBAD | data |
| Exoplanet Archive | data |
| KIC | data |
| Extrasolar Planets; Encyclopaedia | data |

Kepler-22 is a Sun-like star in the northern constellation of Cygnus, the swan, that is orbited by a planet found to be unequivocally within the star's habitable zone. It is located at the celestial coordinates: Right Ascension 19^{h} 16^{m} 52.2^{s}, Declination +47° 53′ 3.9″. With an apparent visual magnitude of 11.7, this star is too faint to be seen with the naked eye. It can be viewed with a telescope having an aperture of at least 4 in (10 cm). The estimated distance to Kepler-22 is 644 light-years (197 parsecs).

== Stellar characteristics ==
Kepler-22 is slightly smaller and cooler than the Sun, with a lower abundance of elements having more mass than helium. It has a spectral type of G5V, while the luminosity class remains undetermined. This star is radiating 79% of the Sun's luminosity from its outer atmosphere at an effective temperature of 5,518 K, giving it the yellow-hued glow of a G-type star. A projected rotational velocity of 0.6 km/s suggests it has a long period of rotation. No flare activity has been detected.

== Planetary system ==
The Kepler-22 planetary system
| Companion (in order from star) | Mass | Semimajor axis (AU) | Orbital period (days) | Eccentricity | Inclination (°) | Radius |
|---|---|---|---|---|---|---|
| b | <9.1 M_{🜨} | 0.812+0.011 −0.013 | 289.863876±0.000013 | <0.72 | 89.764+0.025 −0.042 | 2.10±0.12 R_{🜨} |

On December 5, 2011, scientists from the Kepler mission announced that an exoplanet, Kepler-22b, had been discovered orbiting in the star's habitable zone by NASA's Kepler spacecraft. This was significant in that it was the first relatively small exoplanet (about 2.4 R_{🜨}) confirmed to be orbiting within a star's habitable zone. Its size suggests that it is not likely to be a rocky planet and is more likely to be a mini-Neptune or ocean world; while its mass has not been measured, radial velocity observations have set an upper limit of 9.1 M_{🜨} as of 2023.

== In popular culture ==
Kepler-22b is the source of the extraterrestrial signal which starts the events in the television show Pluribus.
