= Kepler-1229 =

Red dwarf star in the constellation Cygnus

Observation data Epoch J2000 Equinox ICRS
- Constellation: Cygnus
- Right ascension: 19^{h} 49^{m} 56.8076^{s}
- Declination: +46° 59′ 48.103″
- Apparent magnitude (V): 16.37

Characteristics
- Evolutionary stage: Main sequence
- Spectral type: M0
- B−V color index: 1.48

Astrometry
Proper motion (μ)	RA: 21.580(46) mas/yr Dec.: −3.987(44) mas/yr
Parallax (π)	3.7282±0.0376 mas
Distance	875 ± 9 ly (268 ± 3 pc)

Details
Mass	0.43 ± 0.05 M_{☉}
Radius	0.51 ± 0.03 R_{☉}
Luminosity	0.04784 L_{☉}
Surface gravity (log g)	4.75+0.029 −0.023 cgs
Temperature	3784 ± 39 K
Metallicity [Fe/H]	–0.06 ± 0.1 dex
Rotation	17.98±0.04 d
Age	3.72+5.32 −2.07 Gyr

Other designations
- KIC 10027247, KOI-2418

Database references
SIMBAD	data

Kepler-1229 is a red dwarf star located about 875 light-years (268 pc) away from the Earth in the constellation of Cygnus. It is known to host a super-Earth exoplanet within its habitable zone, Kepler-1229b, which was discovered in 2016.

== Nomenclature and history ==
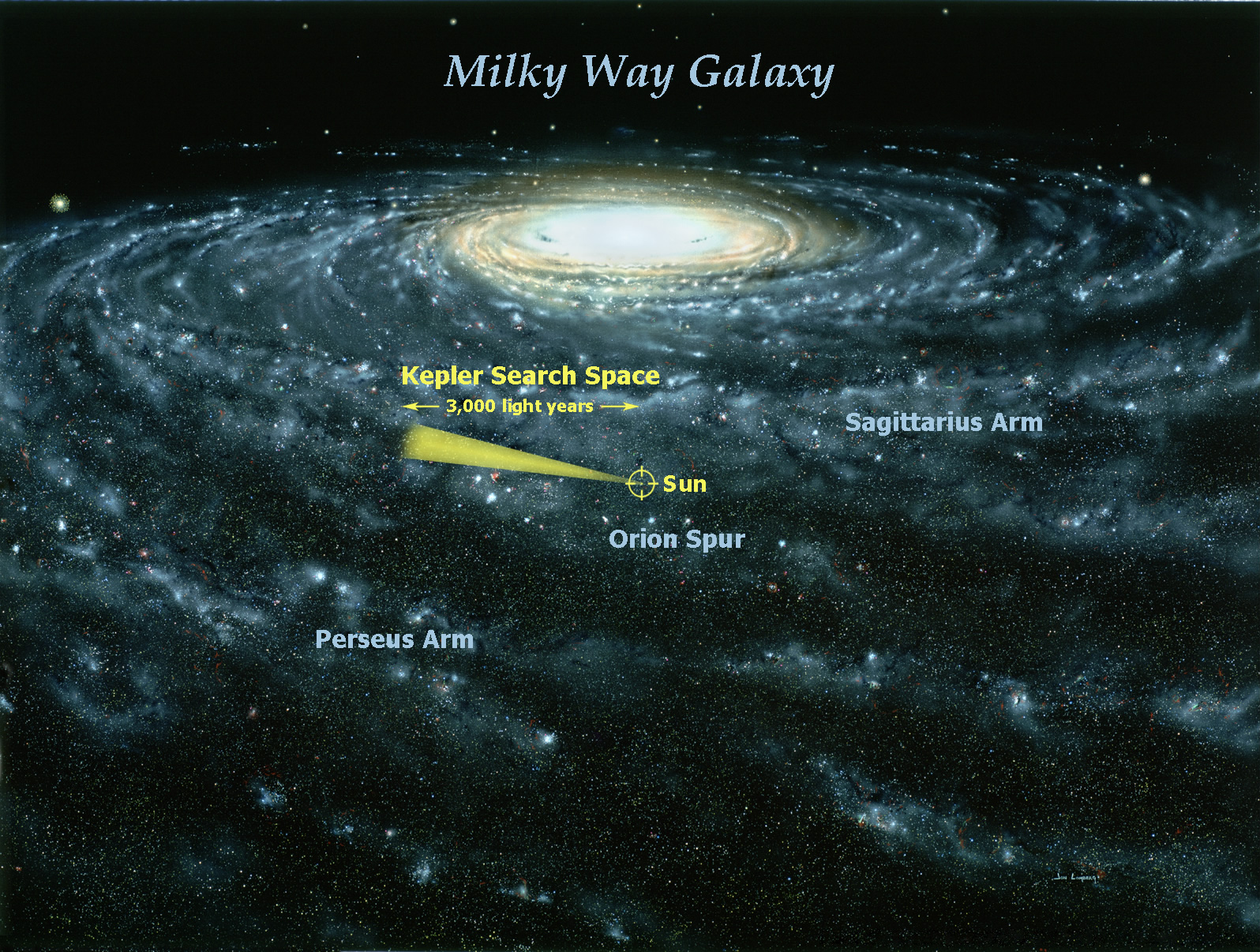
The Kepler Space Telescope search volume, in the context of the Milky Way Galaxy.

Prior to Kepler observation, Kepler-1229 had the 2MASS catalogue number 2MASS J19495680+4659481. In the Kepler Input Catalog it has the designation of KIC 10027247, and when it was found to have a transiting planet candidate it was given the Kepler object of interest number of KOI-2418.

Planetary candidates were detected around the star by NASA's Kepler Mission, a mission tasked with discovering planets in transit around their stars. The transit method that Kepler uses involves detecting dips in brightness in stars. These dips in brightness can be interpreted as planets whose orbits pass in front of their stars from the perspective of Earth, although other phenomenon can also be responsible which is why the term planetary candidate is used.

Following the acceptance of the discovery paper, the Kepler team provided an additional moniker for the system of "Kepler-1229". The discoverers referred to the star as Kepler-1229, which is the normal procedure for naming the exoplanets discovered by the spacecraft. Hence, this is the name used by the public to refer to the star and its planet.

Candidate planets that are associated with stars studied by the Kepler Mission are assigned the designations ".01" etc. after the star's name, in the order of discovery. If planet candidates are detected simultaneously, then the ordering follows the order of orbital periods from shortest to longest. Following these rules, there was only one candidate planet were detected, with an orbital period of 86.829 days.

The designation b, derives from the order of discovery. The designation of b is given to the first planet orbiting a given star, followed by the other lowercase letters of the alphabet. In the case of Kepler-1229, there was only one planet, so only the letter b is used. The name Kepler-1229 derives directly from the fact that the star is the catalogued 1,229th star discovered by Kepler to have confirmed planets.

== Stellar characteristics ==
Kepler-1229 is a red dwarf star that is approximately 54% the mass of and 51% the radius of the Sun. It has a temperature of 3784 K and is roughly 3.72 billion years old. In comparison, the Sun is about 4.6 billion years old and has a temperature of 5778 K.

The star is slightly poor in metals, with a metallicity ([Fe/H]) of about −0.06, or about 87% of the amount of iron and other heavier metals found in the Sun. The star's luminosity is somewhat normal-low for a star like Kepler-1229, with a luminosity of around 4.8% of that of the solar luminosity.

The star's apparent magnitude, or how bright it appears from Earth's perspective, is 15.474. Therefore, it is too dim to be seen with the naked eye.

The star might be surrounded by a dusty medium (based on its infrared excess) that creates the "zodiacal light" phenomenon to the skies of its planets.

== Planetary system ==
The Kepler-1229 planetary system
Companion (in order from star)	Mass	Semimajor axis (AU)	Orbital period (days)	Eccentricity	Inclination (°)	Radius
b	~2.7 M_{🜨}	0.2896	86.829	—	~89.5	1.40+0.11 −0.13 R_{🜨}

The only known planet transits the star; this means that the planet's orbit appear to cross in front of their star as viewed from the Earth's perspective. Its inclination relative to Earth's line of sight, or how far above or below the plane of sight it is, vary by less than one degree. This allows direct measurements of the planet's periods and relative diameters (compared to the host star) by monitoring the planet's transit of the star.

Kepler-1229b is a super-Earth, likely rocky, with a radius of 1.4 R_{🜨}, and it orbits well within the habitable zone. In terms of stellar flux, radius, and equilibrium temperature, Kepler-1229b is similar (or an analog in some terms) to the potentially habitable exoplanet Kepler-62f.

The star may host another exoplanets that does not transit and has an orbital period of 0.589 days, but its detection may be a false alarm due to the presence of a star 14.29" away.
