= Contagious (novel) =

2008 novel by Scott Sigler

- Author: Scott Sigler
- Language: English
- Publisher: Crown Publishing
- Publication place: United States
- Media type: Print (Hardback and e-book), Podcast
- Pages: 448
- ISBN: 978-0307406316
- Preceded by: Infected
- Followed by: Pandemic

Contagious is a science fiction biopunk thriller novel by Scott Sigler. It is the sequel to Sigler's Infected, and like its predecessor was released in both podcast and print versions.

== Plot summary ==
Perry Dawsey and Margaret Montoya attempt to stop an alien infestation of "hatchlings". Dawsey, former Michigan linebacker, has survived the events in Infected, but remains telepathically linked to the aliens. His insight into the aliens' behavior helps the government hunt them down. Dawsey is forced to participate.

== Reception ==
Critical reception for Contagious was mostly positive, with author J. C. Hutchins writing that the book "stayed on target, accelerated, and exceeded my expectations". TOR.com also praised the book, stating that it was "gripping, horrifying, and manages to tie several separate plot threads together effortlessly" while criticizing the portrayal of some of the characters. Bookreporter and Monsters and Critics both positively reviewed the book, with Bookreporter calling it a "don't miss."
