= Alive (novel) =

Book by Scott Sigler

- Author: Scott Sigler
- Cover artist: Caroline Cunningham
- Language: English
- Series: Generations Trilogy
- Genre: Science fiction, dystopia
- Published: July 14, 2015 (Del Rey)
- Publication place: United States
- Media type: Print (Hardcover, e-book,) audiobook
- Pages: 368
- ISBN: 978-0-553-39310-1
- Followed by: Alight
- Website: http://scottsigler.com/book/alive

Alive is a 2015 dystopian young adult novel by American author Scott Sigler and the first book in the Generations Trilogy. The book was first published in hardback, e-book, and audiobook format on July 14, 2015, through Del Rey. The second book in the series, Alight, released on April 6, 2016.

== Plot summary ==
A teenage girl wakes up in a coffin-like container and breaks out, finding herself in a room filled with similar coffins. The name on her coffin is "M. Savage", leading her to be called "Em" by most characters. She helps another girl, whose name is T. Spingate, out of her coffin, and they help four other people out. None of them remember anything, even their names. Each person has a circular marking on their head.

Finding dead bodies in the other coffins, the six teenagers leave the room. Em becomes their leader. They walk through desolate halls filled with human bones and corpses, slowly remembering things about their lives. This goes on for some time.

A boy from the group, named Yong, tries to attack Em and take her leadership position; she ends up killing him. The group continues on, trying to find the exit to what they believe to be an underground prison. They eventually meet another group, which is much larger, and is led by a violent boy named Bishop. He tries to threaten Em into giving up her power, but she stands her ground, and the two groups vote to put her in charge of them both. She leads the now-enlarged group through more hallway. They find bodies and skeletons littering the floors, entire rooms filled with corpses, bodies hanging from ceilings, and so on.

After a while more of walking, Em, Bishop, and a few other characters find a boar, which ends up leading them far away from the rest of the group. During the hunt, a group of boars end up killing and eating an injured girl named Latu, and Em finds an enormous room filled with trees, grass, and water. The group goes into the room and rests there for a while. Latu is buried, and everyone gets their energy back up.

While Em and another girl, Bello, are in a remote part of the room, Bello is snatched and dragged away by humanoid monsters. Em and Bishop fight with the creatures, killing one; the other is revealed to be Em's creature counterpart. The group finds that they're right back where they began, and they've been walking in an enormous circle the entire time.

Em and a few other characters trace back to find a room they previously entered, which they believe may hold important information. A hologram appears; it resembles the monsters that took Bello in the forest room. It reveals that the monsters are actually rotting human beings who should've died a long time ago, and that they're on a spaceship flying away from a dying Earth toward a new planet. The children are told that they were created and grown in the coffins to be avatars for the creatures: receptacles for their consciousnesses, made to live on the new planet in place of the creatures, who can't breathe the new planet's air.

The creature in the hologram says he is against the idea of using children as avatars, and he tells them to get back to their group and find the shuttle that will take them to the new planet. He also says he'll release dozens of children from the coffins, so that the teenagers can take them on the shuttle to safety as well.

Another creature, however, takes over the hologram. She turns out to be Em's counterpart, and her name, M. Savage, stands for Matilda Savage. Matilda supports the idea of using kids as avatars, and she tells the children that she and the other creatures are coming to stop them from leaving. The hologram transmission ends soon after, and the characters in the room rush back to the main group. They find hordes of twelve-year-olds: the children released by the first creature.

Em informs everyone of what's happening, and the group rushes to find the shuttle. By now, they've taken Matilda hostage, and they force her to lead them to the shuttle. When they get there, they find that the army Matilda promised to send has arrived, but almost everyone is able to get in the shuttle regardless. Only two characters die, Matilda is dumped outside the shuttle entrance, and everyone else ends up safe within the shuttle. Alive ends with the shuttle leaving the spaceship, flying toward the new planet.

== Reception ==
Critical reception for Alive has been mostly positive. Publishers Weekly wrote a mixed review, criticizing the book for shifting too quickly into science fiction while praising Sigler for the "burgeoning love triangle between single-circle Em, half-dark circle O'Malley, and circle-star Bishop" and "Em's tortured consciousness over her "savage" self." Entertainment Weekly was more positive in their review, as they felt that "The suspenseful first installment in Sigler’s Generations trilogy lives up to its hype, packing plenty of thrills into its 300-plus pages."

Kirkus Reviews wrote "Sure to win Sigler younger fans, this is the first book of a new trilogy. Em and her group of teenagers end up in an interesting place, creating plenty of energy for Book 2." while Common Sense Media found "From its claustrophobic opening to its crackerjack action climax, this thriller will keep readers guessing right to the end."

On Wednesday, July 15, 2016, it was announced that Alive made #1 on the New York Times Bestseller list in the Young Adult E-Book category.
