= Pandemic (Sigler novel) =

2014 novel by Scott Sigler

- Author: Scott Sigler
- Language: English
- Publisher: Crown Publishing
- Publication date: January 21, 2014
- Publication place: United States
- Media type: Print (Hardback and e-book), Audiobook
- Pages: 592
- ISBN: 978-0-30740-897-6
- Preceded by: Contagious

Pandemic is a 2014 science fiction biopunk thriller novel by Scott Sigler and the final novel in the Infected trilogy. The book was released in hardback, e-book, and audiobook on January 21, 2014 through Crown Publishing and is set several years after the events in Contagious.

== Summary ==
Margaret Montoya's actions at the end of Contagious might have saved the lives of many, however most consider her to be a monster rather than a hero. Since that time she has turned into a shut-in out of guilt, something that has torn apart her relationship with the CIA agent Clarence Otto. However now she is called forth to help fight against a new version of the alien microorganisms, one that was launched by the probe just before it was destroyed. Montoya and the others try to do their best to combat the microorganisms and help keep the general public aware, only for many to assume that this is either a coverup for something more human in origin or an outright fabrication. However, as the book progresses things grow more dire and the world is plunged into an apocalyptic environment.

== Characters ==
- Margaret Montoya
- Sandra Blackmon
- Murray Longworth
- Clarence Otto
- Jeff Brockman
- Cooper Mitchell

== Reception ==
Critical reception has been positive. The Chicago Tribune gave Pandemic a mostly favorable review, writing that "The horrors get a bit tedious as the action gets more ludicrous, and the characters are about as deep as cereal boxes, but Sigler deftly revitalizes clichés — raises them from the dead, you might say." The Washington Post was more positive, stating "The characters are likable, even the ones who fall prey to the plague’s more monstrous side effects, and the snappy dialogue makes this a fun read."
