= Infected (novel) =

2006 novel by Scott Sigler

- Cover artwork for 2008 first edition hardcover
- Author: Scott Sigler
- Language: English
- Publisher: Crown Publishing
- Publication date: 2008 (print), 2006 (podcast)
- Publication place: United States
- Media type: Print (2008 novel and e-book), Podcast
- Pages: 352
- ISBN: 978-0-307-40610-1
- Followed by: Contagious

Infected is a science fiction biopunk thriller novel by author Scott Sigler. The novel was initially released in 2006 in podcast format with a print release in 2008 by Crown Publishing, with Sigler continuing to offer the podcast version online. The book was initially titled Infested, with the name changing in order to distance itself from a movie releasing with a similar title.

== Plot ==
The novel follows several characters as they deal with an alien invasion on the microscopic level. The narration is primarily through the perspectives of Perry Dawsey, an ex-football player with an anger problem, and Margaret Montoya, an epidemiologist with the CDC who is investigating a strange disease that turns seemingly normal people into murderers.

== Reception ==
Critical reception for Infected has been mixed, with Monsters and Critics praising the book's action and pacing. The San Francisco Chronicle panned the book, stating that the book's intensity "might work in a series of cliff-hanging audio episodes, but as a novel to be read in a few sittings, Infected can't rise above its overheated prose and rote characterizations." The Guardian also reviewed Infected, criticizing the book's "portentous cliff-hangers and one-dimensional characters".

The Sacramento News's "Bibliolatry" praised Infected, calling it "imaginative, gross, frightening, suspenseful, funny, thought-provoking and sick in the "omigawd-I-wanna-barf" way". BookReporter and Publishers Weekly also positively reviewed the book, with BookReporter citing the character of Perry Dawsey as the "heart" of the book.

== Adaptations ==
=== Film ===
Infected was formerly optioned by Rogue Pictures and Random House Films, with the option having lapsed in 2010.

=== Graphic novel ===
In 2010, work began on a graphic novel adaptation of Sigler's Infected, with the series to be published by IDW in the summer of 2012. The first issue was released August 1, 2012, but the series was put on hold indefinitely due to delays with subsequent issues.
