= Nocturnal (novel) =

2012 novel by Scott Sigler

- First edition cover of 2012 hardback
- Author: Scott Sigler
- Language: English
- Publisher: Crown Publishing
- Publication date: April 3, 2012 (print), 2007 (podcast)
- Publication place: United States
- Media type: Print (2012 Hardback and e-book), Podcast
- Pages: 576
- ISBN: 0307406342

Nocturnal is a novel and podcast by author Scott Sigler. The novel was originally released in 2007 in podcast format, with a print format releasing in 2012 by Crown Publishing with some elements from the original version altered.

== Plot ==
The book is set in San Francisco and is narrated from multiple perspectives, largely that of Bryan Clauser, a homicide detective known for his calm, cold demeanor. This is in stark contrast to the personality of his partner Lawrence "Pookie" Chang, who spends much of his time making wise-cracks and writing the series bible for a TV series he's developing. The two come across a series of ritualistic murders that appear to be initially unconnected but eventually prove to be related to a teenager by the name of Rex Deprovdechuk. During all of the murders Bryan and Rex both have a series of dreams where they see bizarre, monstrous people murdering the victims in the name of an as yet unknown king. Unbeknownst to the others, the monsters have kidnapped multiple individuals including the homeless junkie Aggie James.

Rex is extremely unpopular at his school and was frequently the subject of physical abuse by his mother and by a gang of bullies called "BoyCo". He's initially unaware that he is the reason for the murders but finds himself genuinely enjoying the murder dreams, not only because he's witnessing his bullies' suffering but also because he finds the violence sexually appealing. Meanwhile, Bryan and Pookie investigate the crimes with the help of Pookie's former partner John "Black Mr. Burns" Smith and find that the murders are being committed by a group called "Marie's Children". The group is steeped in mystery as any records of the group- and their opponents "The Saviors"- have been expunged from multiple places. Rex is eventually approached by Sly and a few members of Marie's Children, who tell him that he is their king and is destined to lead them to a glorious new future. Sly and the others help Rex murder his abusive mother and then take him to a series of hiding places before taking him to "Home". During this Bryan finds that Marie's Children are a humanoid species separate from humanity and that he is one of them. He also reconnects with his ex-girlfriend Robin, a medical examiner for San Francisco.

Bryan and Pookie's investigations lead them to Jebidiah Erickson, but the two are fired by police Chief Amy Zou because they would not leave the investigation alone. Despite this, they break into Erickson's house and find multiple stuffed monsters. They are also caught by Erickson and Bryan ends up stabbing the other man as his Marie's Children DNA, paired with the dreams he'd been having, cause him to see Erickson as a threat. Heavily wounded, Erickson is taken to the hospital and Bryan finds that rather than the older man being the reason for the murders, he was actually hunting Marie's Children and was the reason why there were not more deaths in the city. Meanwhile, Rex returns home and is told that all of Marie's Children are born from the same woman: Marie, who serves as a queen bee and is also Rex's birth mother. He is also told that he must have sex with her in order to create a new queen so the colony can spread to other areas. During this Aggie is told that his life is going to be spared so he can smuggle an infant king out of "Home", as some of the Children do not want the colony to spread and will kill any kings that Marie produces. Knowing that the alternative is death, Aggie readily agrees and later absconds with the infant.

The book culminates with Bryan teaming up with Erickson to invade "Home" and kill off Marie's Children. They ultimately succeed in killing Marie and most of the Children, but the attempt comes at the price of multiple lives, including Erickson's. Robin is also murdered in the process, which leaves him grief-stricken. He decides that he will take on Erickson's role as a Savior (as there are still Children in San Francisco) and assumes his identity, as he feels that he has nothing tying him to his old life. The book ends with the revelation that Hillary, a female leader of the Children, has become a new queen after Marie's death and is being cared for by some of the remaining Children.

== Reception ==
Critical reception for the 2012 release of Nocturnal has been mostly positive, with Kirkus Reviews saying the hardback release was "red meat for readers who wish Harry Potter had swapped his YA credentials for a badge and gun." The Huntington News praised the 2012 release, calling it "a treat". The Nerdist also positively reviewed the book, praising the characters and Sigler's research for the novel.

The Daily Texan praised Sigler's use of science as "believable" but stated that "Where Sigler could use a bit more work is his characterizations".
