= The Rookie (novel) =

2009 novel by Scott Sigler

- Author: Scott Sigler
- Language: English
- Series: Galactic Football League
- Genre: Science fiction
- Published: 2009 (Dark Overlord Press)
- Publication place: United States
- Media type: Print (Hardback, e-book), Podcast
- Pages: 464
- ISBN: 978-0-615-28744-7
- Followed by: The Starter
- Website: http://scottsigler.com/book/the-rookie/

The Rookie is a young adult science fiction sports novel by American writer Scott Sigler. It is the beginning of Sigler's Galactic Football League (GFL) series. The Rookie was first released episodically as a free podcast. The first episode was released in September 2006, and the final episode was released in April 2007, and it was a finalist in the 2007 Parsec Awards for Best Speculative Fiction Story (Novel Form). It was released in both podcast and print versions in early 2009.

== The GFL Universe ==
The Rookie takes place in a galaxy 700 years the future; a galaxy with a history of planetary colonization and conquest, and of interspecies warfare and cooperation. The events of this history have ultimately lead to the current 'pseudo-martial law' state of society that is imposed by the current ruling species, the Creterakians. In this universe, the Creterakians, using their sheer overpowering numbers, have conquered several species and now control and oversee all 'official' aspects of the galaxy. The major species in the GFL are; Humans, the Sklorno, the Ki, the Quyth, and Heavy-G Humans.

== Plot ==
As a means to maintain order without violence, the Creterakians devised a distraction for the masses: the Galactic Football League. The GFL is a sports league modeled after the game of American football, with teams of varying skill separated into three tiers: the most skilled playing in Tier 1, the least skilled playing in Tier 3. The multi-species nature of society is reflected in the make-up of the GFL team lineups; the strengths of certain species make them natural fits for certain football positions. The quarterback, running back and tight-end positions are generally played by Humans. The female Sklorno, known for their speed and jumping ability, play the wide receiver and defensive back positions. The offensive and defensive lines are composed of the Ki, a race of huge, agile creatures with enormous mass. And finally, the linebacker positions are played by Quyth Warriors and High-G Humans.

The Rookie is the story of Quentin Barnes, a human Tier 3 quarterback raised in the Purist Nation. Quentin's planetary religion is that of the Purist Nation, which is very xenophobic. Even other evolutionary strains of human beings are clearly looked down upon - only "pure strain" humans are regarded as proper beings. As a result, Quentin has a very hard time trusting and working with his team-mates. The Purist Nation is composed entirely of humans. They shun and demonize any species other than humans, calling them the 'Satanic' or 'Lower' races. As a Tier 3 quarterback, Quentin is a superstar and a hero among the Purists, and he has used his talents to easily lead his third rate team to the championship of a Tier 3 division. His natural talent, coupled with his Purist Nation upbringing have made him extremely arrogant and racist.

The story begins with Quentin Barnes playing Tier 3 football on a small planet colony nicknamed 'Micovi'. His contract is purchased by underworld mogul Gredok the Splithead, who is a Quyth Leader, or Shamakath, and suddenly Quentin is on his way to 'The Combine' to get cleared before he starts playing with the Ionath Krakens, a Tier 2 football team. A great deal many people attempt to clear the Combine, a former Creterakian prison station, with biological and cybernetic enhancements in place. The Creterakians require all football players to go through the extensive testing for enhancements in The Combine as any modification or 'Mods' are highly illegal. Quentin passes the tests and is admitted to the team. He then goes to practice with the Ionath Krakens where, for the first time, he has to come face-to-face with the reality of his new team-mates' alien origins.

The Rookie shows Quentin's fight to not only win the Tier 2 Championship and advance to Tier 1, but also his fight to overcome himself and his own prejudices.
