= Ancestor (novel) =

2007 novel by Scott Sigler

- First edition
- Author: Scott Sigler
- Language: English
- Genre: Horror, Science fiction
- Published: Dragon Moon Press (2007), Crown Publishing (2010)
- Publication place: United States
- Media type: Print (Hardback and e-book), Podcast
- ISBN: 978-1-896944-73-9
- Website: http://scottsigler.com/book/ancestor

Ancestor is a science fiction thriller novel by American writer Scott Sigler. The novel was released in podcast format in 2006, with it also being released in print via Dragon Moon Press in 2007. Ancestor was later re-released by Crown Publishing in 2010.

== Premise ==
Protagonist PJ Colding and his crew are tasked with transporting a team of scientists to an island in the Canadian arctic wilderness. They latterplan to recreate the ancestor of all humanity in order to provide life-saving organs that would be compatible with all humans. Aa now storm threatens to trap them on the island. The experiment succeeds with dire results.

== Reception ==
Critical reception for the 2010 re-release of Ancestor has been positive, with Nerdist writing "It’s like Michael Crichton and Stephen King had a fabulous, bouncing baby". The Guardian criticized the prose and characterisation as "rudimentary" but praised the pacing and denouement. BookReporter also praised the novel, citing its characters as a highlight.

Of the 2009 print release, HorrorNews.net wrote "I can see how this format was appealing for the more imaginative podcast format – but avid readers who enjoy fast-paced and exciting sci-fi thrillers will be disappointed by the print version of this effort."
