= Aliens: Phalanx =

2020 science fiction novel by Scott Sigler

- Author: Scott Sigler
- Audio read by: Bronson Pinchot
- Language: English
- Series: Alien
- Genre: Science fiction, horror
- Publisher: Titan Books
- Publication date: 2020
- Publication place: United States
- Media type: Print, ebook, audiobook
- Pages: 512 pages
- ISBN: 1789095255 First edition hardback
- Preceded by: Alien: Prototype
- Followed by: "Another Mother" (short fiction sequel)

Aliens: Phalanx is a 2020 science fiction horror novel by Scott Sigler and the ninth book in the third novel series based on the Alien franchise. It was first published in 2020 through Titan Books in audio, e-book, and print.

== Premise ==
On the planet Ataegina, which has a medieval culture, humans engage in conflict with an army of Xenomorphs.

== Synopsis ==
The novel is set on the world of Ataegina, where humanity lives in mountain holds in order to escape death from the "demons", their name for Xenomorphs. They are unaware of life on other planets or other events in the Alien universe and their culture is varied but similar to feudalism. The inhabitants pass along what limited information they know about the demons, including knowledge of a Demon Mother living on Black Smoke Mountain, through warnings and mythology.

The story focuses primarily on Ahiliyah, Brandun, and Creen, runners from Lemeth Hold. Runners are responsible for making trips to various holds such as Dakatera and Keflan while carrying large amounts of cargo to trade for much-needed goods, supplies, and information. Although proud of her skills, Ahiliyah chafes under the patriarchal mindset of the Hold and would rather be a warrior. Women are not allowed to become warriors due to the Margrave and council's belief that women cannot be good warriors and can only perform gender-specific roles, such as motherhood and marriage. Only one hold, Datakera, believes that women can hold positions of power, as it is led by a Margravine, a female hold leader.

During a run from her hold to Keflan, the trio discovers that demons have overtaken the hold and killed many of its people. Aware that their hold needs supplies found only at Keflan, they load up their packs and return home. On the way they are attacked by a demon, which Ahiliyah manages to kill. In the process they discover that the caminus leaves they use as camouflage, which grow in abundance everywhere, can neutralize the demons' blood. Upon their return Creen is given permission to develop the leaves as a weapon, however Ahiliyah cannot convince the Margrave that their hold is in danger of being overtaken.

Creen manages to create a paste that can kill demons, albeit slowly. During some testing he and Ahiliyah discover survivors from Dakatera, which has also fallen. They bring the survivors inside, however soon after Lemeth is attacked by the demons, who have managed to burrow into the holds by breeding with a burrowing animal capable of making tunnels. Ahiliyah takes command of several warriors and, using the paste, successfully fends off two waves of demons. She sends word to other holds that they have an effective weapon against the demons and wants others to march with her to Black Smoke Mountain to defeat the Demon Mother. Troops from one of the other holds arrive and march with her, but the commander refuses to follow Ahiliyah's strategy of a circular phalanx. As a result, they are overtaken and brought into the mountain to become hosts for new demons.

Ahiliyah, Brandun, and Creen manage to survive by eating the caminus leaves on their clothing, which kills the demon embryos. While trying to escape they encounter Zachariah, a synthetic that tells them the history of the demons. Just over 300 years ago a colony ship was overtaken by Xenomorphs and crash-landed on Ataegina. The ship's crew and presumably adult colonists died, but the children survived and went on to form civilizations without knowledge of the outside universe. The Xenomorphs also survived and eventually managed to make their way out of the mountain and overtake the humans, forcing them to live in holds.

Ahiliyah comes up with the idea of killing the Demon Mother by cooking her with a superheated blast of water from a geyser, but this plan is unsuccessful and Zachariah is killed by one of the demons. Brandun then chooses to use their final dose of poison to kill the Demon Mother, sacrificing himself in the process. The remaining demons are relatively easily killed by the remaining troops and new reinforcements from other holds and Ahiliyah becomes the ruler of a new, unified Ataegina, continuing to train her army against the threat of human raiders from across the sea to the north.

== Development ==
Sigler first contributed to the franchise with the short story Dangerous Prey in the 2017 anthology Aliens: Bug Hunt, written from the perspective of the Xenomorphs. When creating the novel's storyline, Sigler chose to focus on what would happen if there was a planet-wide Xenomorph attack and the survivors could only fight using spears and shields. He also chose to set this in a medieval society that had no knowledge of the rest of the universe, spaceships, advanced weaponry, or Weyland-Yutani, as well as other science fiction elements typically featured in the Alien franchise, something he described as challenging. In an interview with Daily Dead he described this as “300 meets Aliens.” Sigler researched Sumerian, Egyptian, Greek, and Roman societies and used Myke Cole’s Legion vs. Phalanx heavily as reference material.

== Publication ==
The novel was released in paperback and e-book format on February 25, 2020, in the United States and United Kingdom through Titan Books. A limited-edition hardback was also released through Titan Books on the same day. An audiobook adaptation narrated by Bronson Pinchot was simultaneously released through Blackstone Publishing. Titan Books republished the novel in The Complete Aliens Collection: Living Nightmares, the third volume in the reprint series, together with Infiltrator and Vasquez in November 2024.

== Reception ==
In a review for the British Fantasy Society, Sarah Deeming praised the character of Ahiliyah and the novel's tension. Empire Online listed the audiobook adaptation as one of thirteen "Best Audiobooks For Movie Fans" and Aliens: Phalanx also received a review from the Financial Times. Ginger Nuts of Horror stated that they were concerned "whether the constraints of the Aliens franchise (acid for blood etc) would hold back the multi-dimensional imagination of the Future Doom Overlord (FDO), as his hardcore fans like to call him" and that while this did prove to be the case, the novel was "still an excellent Scott Sigler novel and if you’re a fan of his high-octane action sequences, gory violence and tough characters there is much to enjoy here."

== Sequel ==
In 2022 a short story entitled "Another Mother" was published in the anthology Aliens vs. Predators: Ultimate Prey. Also written by Sigler, the short story is set twenty years after the events of Phalanx. Atagina has flourished, however the survivors were unable to completely eliminate the demons, resulting in the birth of a new Demon Mother. During their search for the new nest Ahiliyah and Creen discover evidence of a new threat to humanity, which Creen correctly deduces is extraterrestrial. They eventually cross paths with a Yautjua named Yeh'kull, who was sent to assess the planet's suitability as a game reserve. While their initial interactions are hostile, the three eventually agree to work together to find and kill the Demon Mother. They successfully locate the new hive, where Yeh'kull manages to kill the Demon Mother and destroy the nest with the others' assistance.
