= J. C. Hutchins =

Chris Hutchins
- Born: January 26, 1975 (age 51)
- Partner: Eleanor Brown
- Writing career
- Pen name: J. C. Hutchins
- Genre: Science fiction
- Notable work: 7th Son
- Website: jchutchins.net

J. C. Hutchins is the pseudonym for American podcast novelist and journalist Chris Hutchins. Hutchins is best known for his 7th Son series.

== Background ==
Hutchins began podcasting in 2006 after receiving multiple rejections from various agents, with 7th Son being his first podcast release. Shortly thereafter in 2007, St. Martin's Press picked up the print rights to 7th Son and Dark Arts, an interactive novel. Hutchins, writes from home alongside his partner, novelist Eleanor Brown.

== Bibliography ==
=== Books published in print ===
- 7th Son: Descent (2009)
- Personal Effects: Dark Arts (2009)

=== Podcast novels ===
- 7th Son: Descent
- 7th Son: Deceit
- 7th Son: Destruction
- Personal Effects: Sword of Blood

== Reception and influence ==
=== Critical reception ===
Hutchins' work has had mixed to positive reviews, with Publishers Weekly praising both the first novel in the 7th Son series and Dark Arts and Kirkus Reviews panning both. The Celebrity Cafe reviewed Dark Arts, praising the story but stating that the extra elements detracted from the story instead of enhancing it.

=== Praise by other authors ===
In an episode of the Aussie Osbourne Show William J. Bruce III described Hutchins as "transmedia legend", while Eleanor Brown has dubbed Hutchins a "new media superstar.
