= Scott Sigler =

American writer

- Sigler at Dragon Con in 2026
- Born: Scott Carl Sigler; Cheboygan, Michigan, U.S.
- Education: Olivet College; Cleary College (BA, BS)
- Occupation: Author
- Writing career
- Genres: Science fiction, Horror
- Movement: The Podiobook (Podcast Novel)
- Website: scottsigler.com

Scott Carl Sigler is an American author of science fiction and horror and a podcaster. Scott is a New York Times No. 1 bestselling author of twenty one novels, six novellas, dozens of short stories, and thousands of podcast episodes. He is a co-founder of Empty Set Entertainment, which publishes his young adult Galactic Football League series. He lives in San Diego.

== Early life and education ==
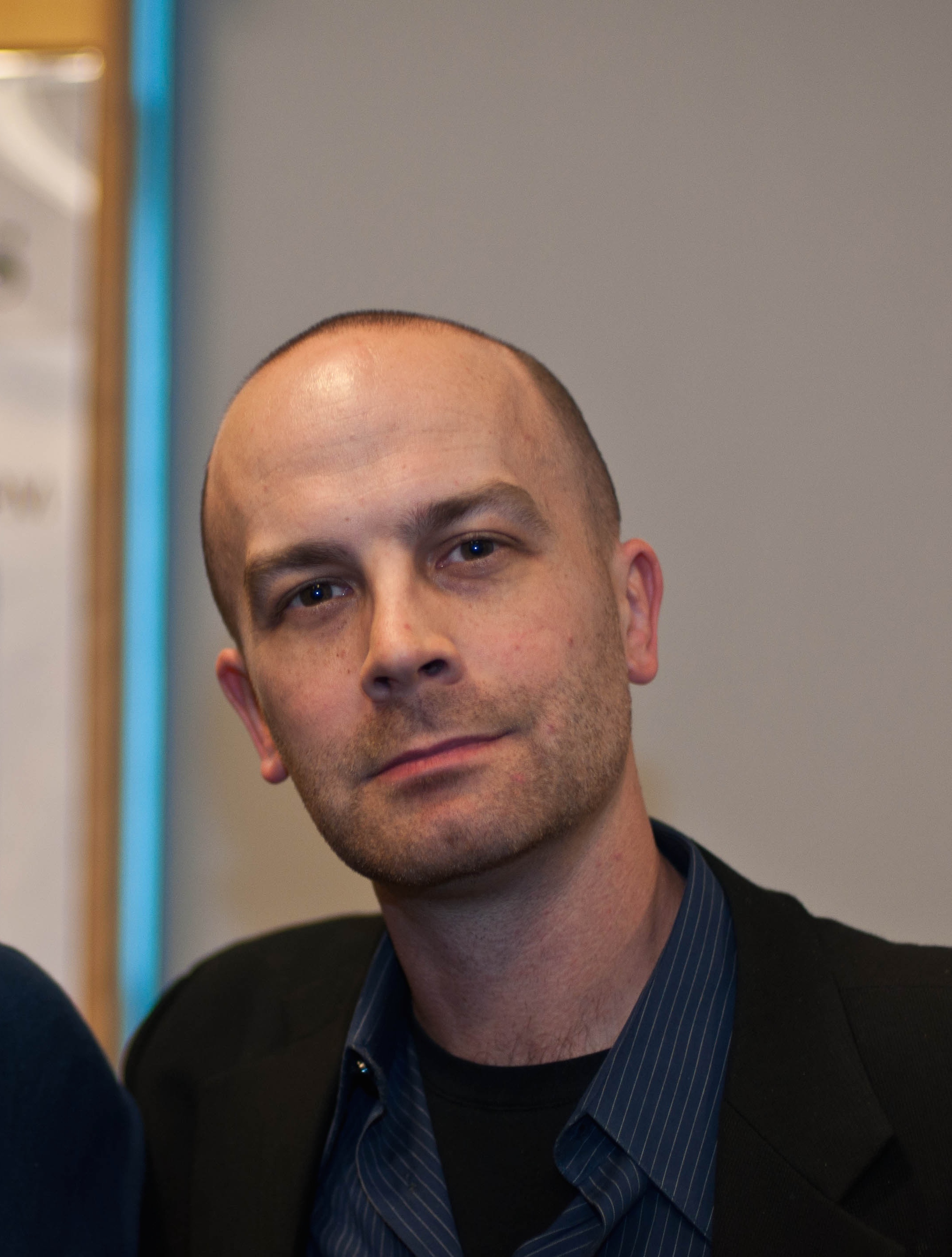
Sigler in 2010

Sigler was born and raised in Cheboygan, Michigan, where he inherited a love of classic monster films from his father. His mother, a school teacher, encouraged his reading, offering him any book he wanted.

== Career ==
Sigler wrote his first monster story, "Tentacles, Tentacles & More Tentacles," at the age of eight. Sigler attended Olivet College (Olivet, MI) and Cleary College (Ann Arbor, MI), where he earned a BA in journalism and a BS in marketing. Sigler has had a varied career path, having worked fast food, picking fruit, and shoveling horse manure, as well as working as a sports reporter, director of marketing for a software company, software startup founder, marketing consultant, guitar salesman, and played bass guitar in the post-hardcore band The Transfer.

EARTHCORE was originally published in 2001 by iPublish, an AOL/Time Warner imprint. With the novel doing well as a promotional ebook, Time Warner was planning on publishing the novel. With the economic slump following September 11 attacks, Time Warner did away with the imprint in 2004. Scott then decided to start podcasting his novel in March, 2005 as the world's first podcast-only novel to build hype and garner an audience for his work. Sigler considered it a "no brainer" to offer the book as a free audio download. Having searched for podcast novels and finding none, Sigler decided to be the first. Sigler was able to get EARTHCORE offered as a paid download on iTunes in 2006. After EARTHCORE's success (EARTHCORE had over 10,000 subscribers), Sigler released Ancestor, Infected, The Rookie, Nocturnal, and Contagious via podcast.

Sigler released an Adobe PDF version of Ancestor in March 2007 through Sigler's own podcast as well as others. Ancestor was released on April 1, 2007, to much internet hype and, despite having been released two weeks earlier as a free ebook, reached No. 7 on Amazon's best-seller list and No. 1 on Sci-Fi, Horror and Genre-Fiction on the day of release. Sigler is leveraging new media to keep in-touch with his fans, regularly talking with them using social networking sites, via email, and IM. Scott Sigler was featured in a New York Times article on March 1, 2007, by Andrew Adam Newman, which was covering authors using podcasting innovations to garner a broader audience.

In March 2014, Executive Editor Mark Tavani at Ballantine Bantam Dell bought World Rights to a science fiction trilogy by Sigler. In the first book, Alive, a young woman awakes trapped in a confined space with no idea who she is or how she got there. She soon frees other young adults in the room and together they find that they are surrounded by the horrifying remains of a war long past ... and matched against an enemy too horrible to imagine. Further adventures will follow in two more books, Alight and Alone. The books will be published under the Del Rey imprint. On Wednesday, July 15, 2016, it was announced that Alive made No. 1 on the New York Times Bestseller list in the Young Adult E-Book category. Sigler calls Stephen King a "'master craftsman', who writes from the 'regular guy' strata from which he hails. His older stuff had no pretense, no 'higher message,' no 'I’m extremely important' attitude, just rock-solid storytelling and character development. He also would whack any character at any time, and that’s what hooked you in – when characters got into trouble, you didn’t know if they’d live, unlike 99% of the books out there that are trying to develop franchise characters." According to Sigler, Jack London's "The Sea-Wolf totally changed my views on life". Sigler saw King Kong (1976) when he was a little kid. He said it, "Scared the crap out of me. I hid behind my dad’s shoulder and begged to leave the theatre. As soon as we were out, I asked when we could see it again – that was the moment I knew I wanted to tell monster stories. I wanted to have that same impact on other people."

=== Awards ===
Sigler has been a runner up in both the 2006 and 2007 Parsec Awards. In 2006 Sigler was a runner up for his short story Hero in the Best Fiction (Short) category and for Infected in the Best Fiction (Long) category. In 2007 Sigler was a runner up for The Rookie in the Best Speculative Fiction Story (Novel Form) category.

In 2008, Sigler won the Parsec Award for Red Man in the Best Speculative Fiction Story (Short Form) category. He followed up with another win in 2009 for Eusocial Networking in the Best Speculative Fiction Story (Novella Form) category. 2010 saw him continue to win in the Best Speculative Fiction Story (Short Form) category with his podcast, The Tank, and in 2011 he again took out the Best Speculative Fiction Story (Novella Form) category with Kissyman & the Gentleman.

On July 31, 2015, Scott was inducted into the inaugural class of the Academy of Podcasters Hall of Fame at a ceremony in Fort Worth, Texas.

== Personal life ==
Sigler resides in San Diego, California with his wife and dogs.

== Bibliography ==
=== Stand-alone novels ===
- Ancestor (2007)
- Nocturnal (2012)
- Kissyman & the Gentleman (2019)
- Aliens: Phalanx (2020)
- Beasts Beyond The River (2026)

=== Sun Symbol series ===
- EARTHCORE (2001, 2nd edition in 2017)
- MOUNT FITZ ROY (2020)

=== Infected trilogy ===
- Infected (2008)
- Contagious (2008)
- Pandemic (2014)

=== Galactic Football League series ===
- The Rookie (2009)
- The Starter (2010)
- The All-Pro (2011)
- The MVP (2012)
- The Champion (2014)
- The Gangster (2021)

=== Generations trilogy ===
- Alive (2015)
- Alight (2016)
- Alone (2017)

=== The Crypt series ===
- The Crypt, Book One: Shakedown (2023)
- The Crypt, Book Two: Voidstrike (2026)

=== The Man In Gray series ===
- Slay (2024)
- Slay 2: Hatchet Man (2025 tentative; podcast finished Sep 8, 2024)
- Slay 3: Easy Kill (TBD; podcast currently ongoing)

== Adaptations ==
=== Film ===
In May, 2007 the novel Infected was optioned by Rogue Pictures and Random House Films; however, the option lapsed in April 2010. The short story "Sacred Cow" was made into an online only mini-film by StrangerThings.tv and was Stranger Things debut episode. "Cheating Bastard", a short film about a couple in love with football and their obsession with it, was created by Brent Weichsel and released via Sigler's RSS feed.

=== Graphic novel ===
In 2010, work began on a graphic novel adaptation of Sigler's Infected. The first issue was released August 1, 2012, but the series was put on hold indefinitely due to delays with subsequent issues.

=== Audio dramatizations ===
GraphicAudio has produced full cast dramatizations for the following Sigler titles:

- Galactic Football League series (The Rookie, The Starter, The All-Pro, The MVP, The Champion, The Gangster, The Reporter, The Detective, Title Fight, The Rider, The Stone Wolves)
- Generations trilogy (Alive, Alight, Alone)
- Sun Symbol series (EARTHCORE, MOUNT FITZ ROY)
- Druden adapted from the screenplay written by Scott Sigler with Adrian Picardi

== Recordings ==
=== Albums ===
- The Crucible (2016) by Separation Of Sanity. Scott's original spoken word appears on four tracks: "The Pact," "Pandemic" (inspired by his novel of the same name), "Bag Of Blood" (his major appearance on the album), and "End Of Days".
- Intersections (2018) by Evan Diamond & The Library. Scott plays bass on all tracks.
- The Sweet Sensual Sounds of Superweapon EP (Jul 1, 2022) by Superweapon. Scott, in the guise of Minister Merciless, is the singer and bassist for the band.

=== Readings ===
- Scott reads Union Dues – Off White Lies by Jeffrey R. DeRego on Escape Pod, Episode 49, on April 13, 2006.
- Scott reads Reggie vs. Kaiju Storm Chimera Wolf by Matthew Wayne Selznick on Escape Pod, Episode 117, on August 2, 2007.
