= Ah-Shi-Sle-Pah Wilderness =

Protected wilderness area in New Mexico, United States

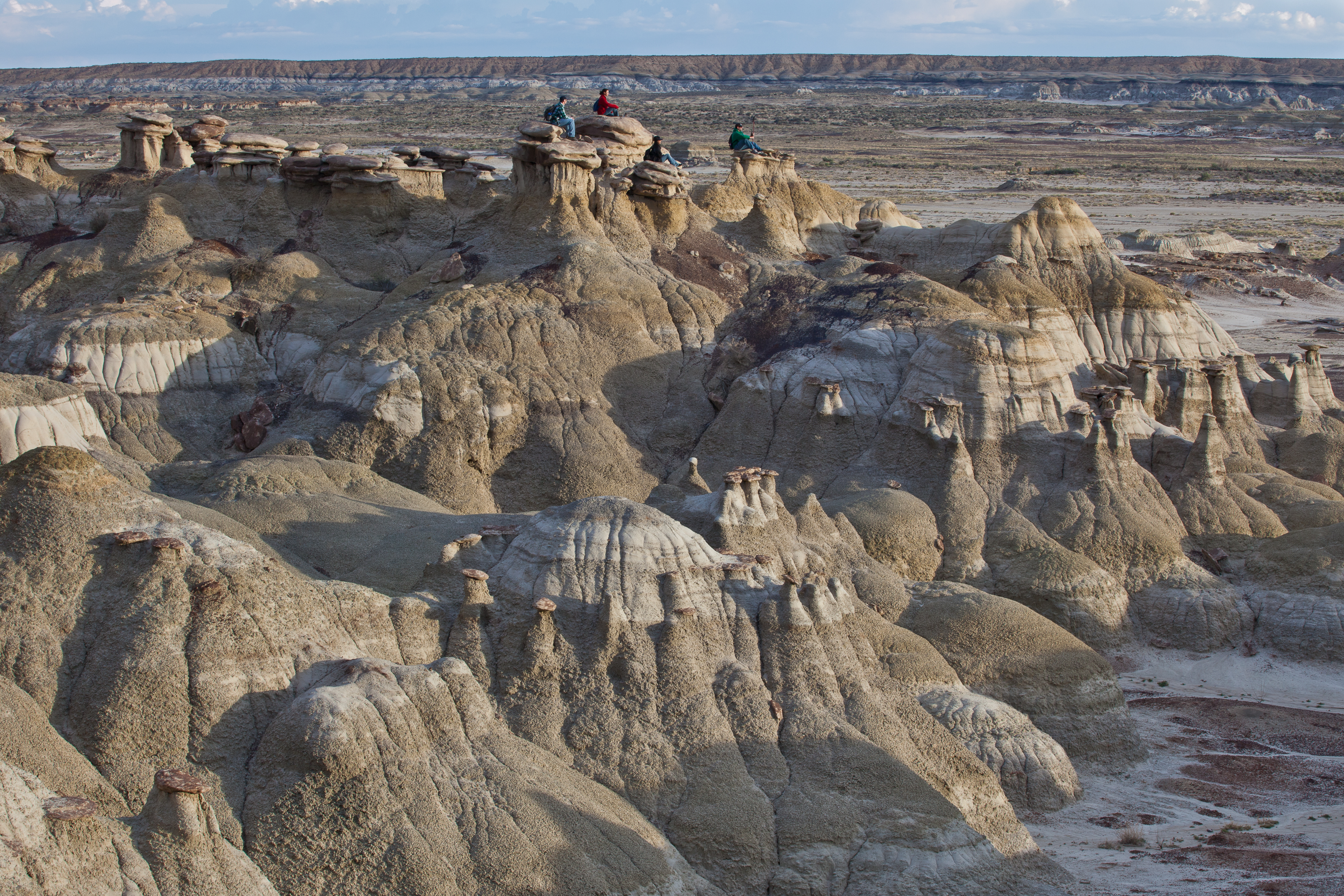
- Ah-Shi-Sle-Pah hoodoos

- Location within New Mexico Location within the United States
- Location: San Juan County, New Mexico
- Nearest city: Bloomfield, New Mexico
- Coordinates: 36.16668°N 107.91729°W
- Area: 7,242 acres (29.31 km^{2})
- Established: 2019
- Governing body: Bureau of Land Management

Ah-Shi-Sle-Pah Wilderness is located in San Juan County, New Mexico, between Chaco Canyon and the De-Na-Zin Wilderness. Its name is a phonetic transliteration of Navajo "áshįįh łibá" meaning "salt, it is grey [grey salt]". The wilderness has multicolored badlands, sandstone hoodoos, petrified wood, and dinosaur bones, similar to those found in the nearby Bisti Badlands and De-Na-Zin Wilderness.

Storms in fall 2026 caused several notable hoodoos, including King of Wings and Alien Throne, to collapse.

== History ==
The BLM Wilderness Study Area (WSA) was declared in May 1992 and would protect an area of about 26.5 km^{2} (6,563 acres). The area was prospected by the dinosaur hunter Charles Hazelius Sternberg in the summer of 1921. Sternberg collected the type specimen of Pentaceratops fenestratus, a ceratopsid dinosaur from the late Cretaceous Period, within the WSA. In 2011, the ankylosaur genus of Ahshislepelta and its sole representative species Ahshislepelta minor were first formally described from a partial specimen recovered from the wilderness from 2005 to 2009, which now serves as the species' holotype, and were named after the wilderness. Specimens from this area form a significant part of the vertebrate paleontology collection at the Museum of Evolution, University of Uppsala, Sweden. Fossil collecting here without a permit is prohibited by law.

The John D. Dingell Jr. Conservation, Management, and Recreation Act, signed March 12, 2019, authorizes the establishment of the Ah-Shi-Sle-Pah Wilderness as a component of the National Wilderness Preservation System, protecting approximately 7,242 acres.

During and after numerous major storms in the region in September and October 2026, several iconic hoodoos collapsed. These include the "King of Wings" and the "Alien Throne".

== Geology ==
Rock units within the Ah-Shi-Sle-Pah WSA include most of the upper Fruitland Formation (Fossil Forest Member) and lower part of the Kirtland Formation (Hunter Wash Member), both late Cretaceous in age. The rocks are dominated by mudstones and intermittent sandstones, with occasional resistant channel sandstones.

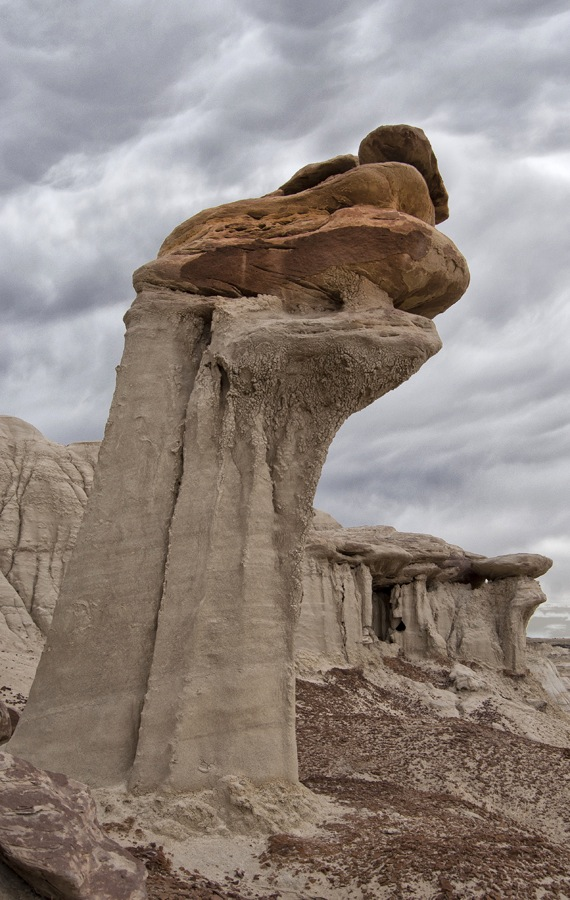
Giant hoodoo at Ah-Shi-Sle-Pah

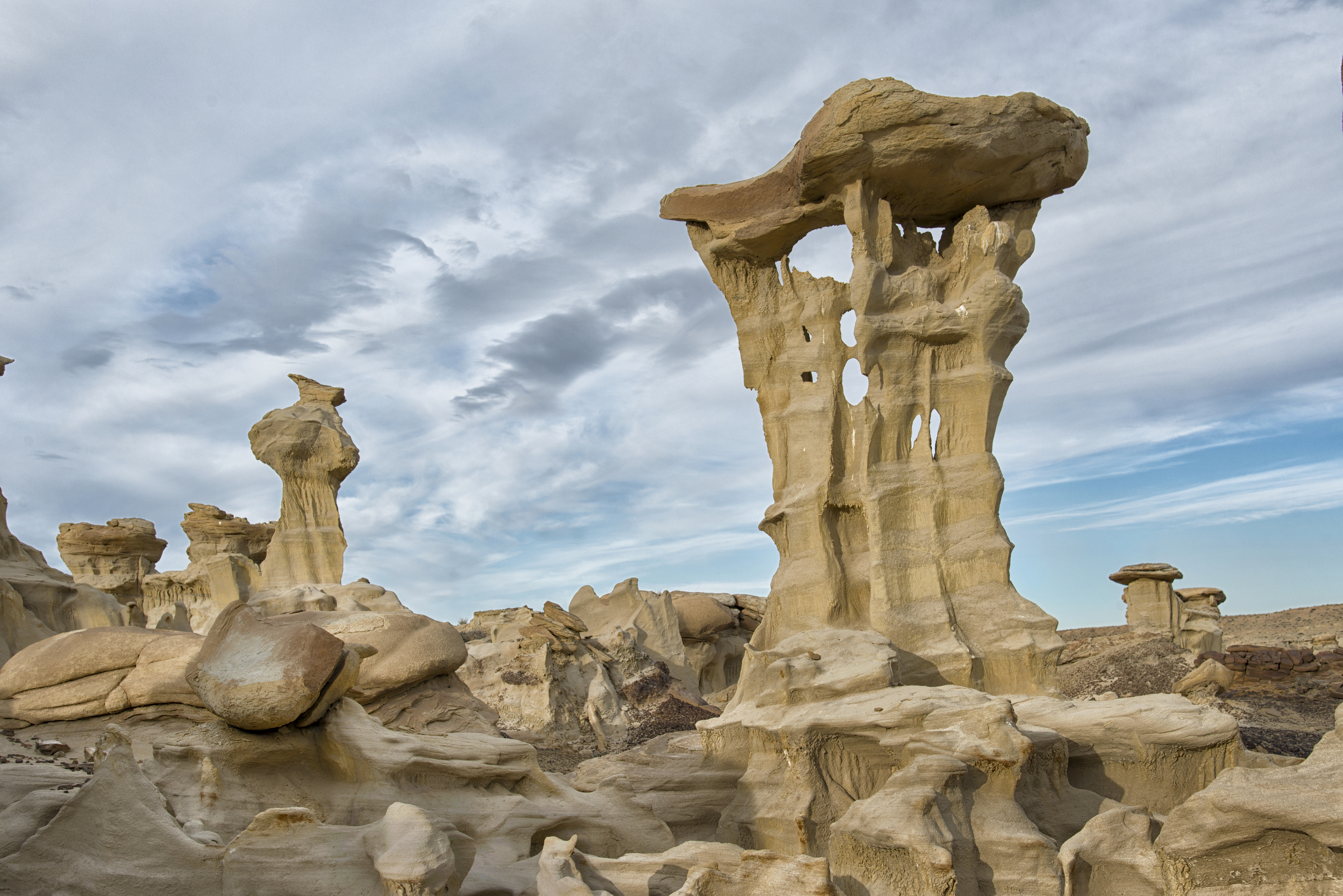
Hoodoos in the "Valley of Dreams" at Ah-Shi-Sle-Pah, including the monumental hoodoo known as the "Alien Throne" (right), which had collapsed as of October 30th, 2026, although the exact date is not known.

== See also ==
- Bisti/De-Na-Zin Wilderness
- Kasha-Katuwe Tent Rocks National Monument
- Demoiselles Coiffées de Pontis
- Đavolja Varoš
