= Vratna Gates =

Natural stone bridges on the Miroč mountain, Serbia

- Rock arch
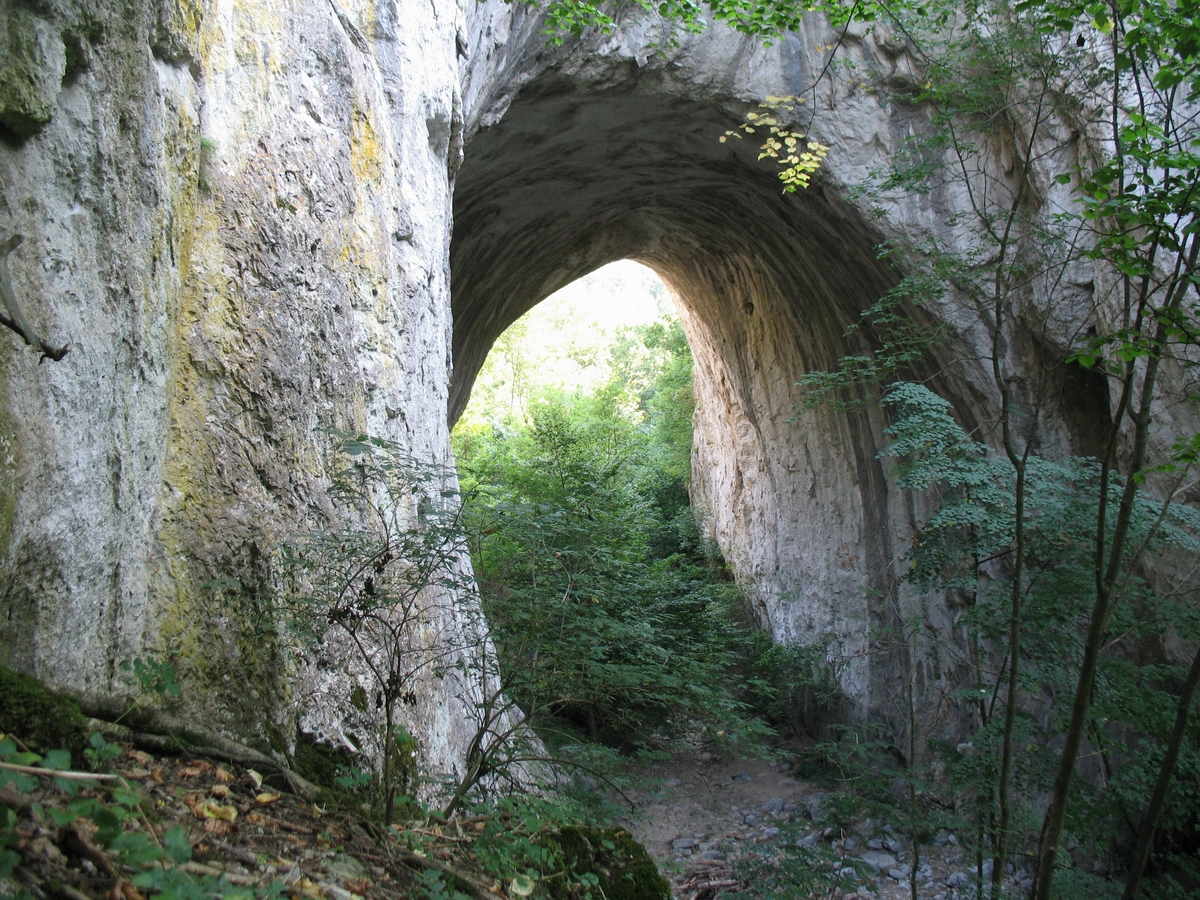
- One of three natural bridges on Vratna, Suva prerast

- Coordinates: 44°23′00″N 22°20′14″E
- Location: Bor municipality, Serbia

Prerasts of Vratna (Serbian: Прерасти Вратне, Prerasti Vratne) or Vratna Gates (Serbian: Вратњанске капије, Vratnjanske kapije) are three natural stone bridges on the Miroč mountain, two in the vicinity of the medieval Vratna monastery, and the third farther away into the depths of the Vratna river gorge, in Bor, eastern Serbia.

Stone gates of this type are rare. Similar ones can be found in Slovenia, France and in Colorado, in the United States. It has been declared a geomorphological natural monument and placed under the state protection in 1957.

== Name ==
Prerast (see прерасти) in Serbian means "outgrowth" or "overgrowth." In this case it is an unambiguous term by the local population for these types of natural rock bridges, vaults and gates.

== Prerasts ==
In the entire Serbia, there is about a dozen of prerasts, of which three are located in the valley of the Vratna river.

- Little Prerast (Mala Prerast) is about 200 m (660 ft) upstream from the Vratna monastery and is 15 m (49 ft) long. The width of its opening is 22 m (72 ft), height 34 m (112 ft), while the thickness of the arch above the opening is 10 m (33 ft). The Vratna rivers flows through the gate.
- Big Prerast (Velika Prerast) is about 100 m (330 ft) from the Little Prerast and its length is 45 m (148 ft). The width of the opening is 23 m (75 ft), height 26 m (85 ft) and the thickness of the arch above the opening is 30 m (98 ft). The river also flows through it and the area of Big Prerast is known for its acoustics.
- Dry Prerast (Suva Prerast) is the least approachable. It is almost 3 km (1.9 mi) upstream from the other gates and into the gorge. Its length is 34 m (112 ft), width of opening is 15 m (49 ft), height 20 m (66 ft) and thickness of the arch above the opening 10 m (33 ft). Its name comes from the fact that the Vratna river, in the summer, plunges 50 m (160 ft) upstream from it, but later appears and disappears again, before once again breaking out from the rock, and continues to run on the surface.

They are entered through marked hiking trails, which was through monastic property. Nowadays trail go around monastic land and leads beneath first Vratna Gate or Little Prerast. The Vratna monastery itself, today a female convent, was established in the 14th century by the monk Nicodemus of Tismana.

== Geology ==
The Prerasts of Vratna consist of late Jurassic limestones and are of different origins. While the first two are remains of a former cave tunnel through which the river Vratna ran through, and part of the arch between them collapsed, the third resulted from the plunging of the river. Further chemical erosion and mechanical forces shaped the gates into their present look. The collapsed cave ceiling is some 100 m (330 ft) long. The Vratna river flew both above the ground and through the former large cave, also being a losing stream, as it is today.

In the vicinity of the gates are three caves, examples of karst terrain. They remain largely unexplored. The largest one is 400 m (1,300 ft) long, another one has a complex of tunnels and corridors while the third has a small lake. They were discovered in the 21st century.

== Exploration ==
First records of the gates were left by Austro-Hungarian ethnographer and traveler Felix Philipp Kanitz who traveled across the Balkans in the 1850s-1880s. He left the detailed account of the gates. Some of the earliest Serbian geographers also researched the formation, Vladimir Karić and Jovan Cvijić, who explored the gates in the late 19th century.

Professors from the University of Belgrade Geography Faculty, Dragan Petrović and Dušan Gavrilović, accurately measured the gates.

Next to the Big Prerast is a wooden bridge across the river, and the scenic viewpoint.

== Protection ==
Vratna Gates have been protected as the natural monuments since 1957. The wildlife includes red deer and mouflon, which were introduced in 1965 in the local hunting ground. There are also various bat and bird species. Birds are building nests in the hollows of the gates themselves. Other wildlife include roe deer, wild boar, marten, otter, badger, and red fox.

There are various medicinal herbs in the area. The area is covered with lush, deciduous forest.

In the mid-2000s, severe droughts destroyed almost all aquatic life in the river.

== Folklore ==
As with the rest of eastern Serbia, the local population has numerous magical myths about the gates and the nearby caves. Some of them say that they are inhabited by the vilas, which are good-hearted and like to help people. People still come to pray or to make a wish next to the gates.

However, the place also holds a darker position in the local so-called Vlach magic and rituals. People considered gates a portals which connect our world with other worlds and dimensions. Demons from the other side lurked behind the gates, and could be held there and prevented to cross into our world only by proper rituals.

== See also ==
- List of rock formations in Serbia
- Vratna monastery
