= List of rock formations in Serbia =

Partial list of rock formations in Serbia:

| Image | Name | Location | Notes |
|---|---|---|---|
| | Đavolja Varoš | Kuršumlija 42°59′N 21°24′E | |
| | Prskalo waterfall | Kučaj mountains | |
| | Prerast of Vratna River | Kladovo | |
| | Đavoljev kamen | Trgovište | |

== See also ==
- List of caves in Serbia
