= Bisti/De-Na-Zin Wilderness =

Wilderness in New Mexico, United States

- IUCN category Ib (wilderness area)
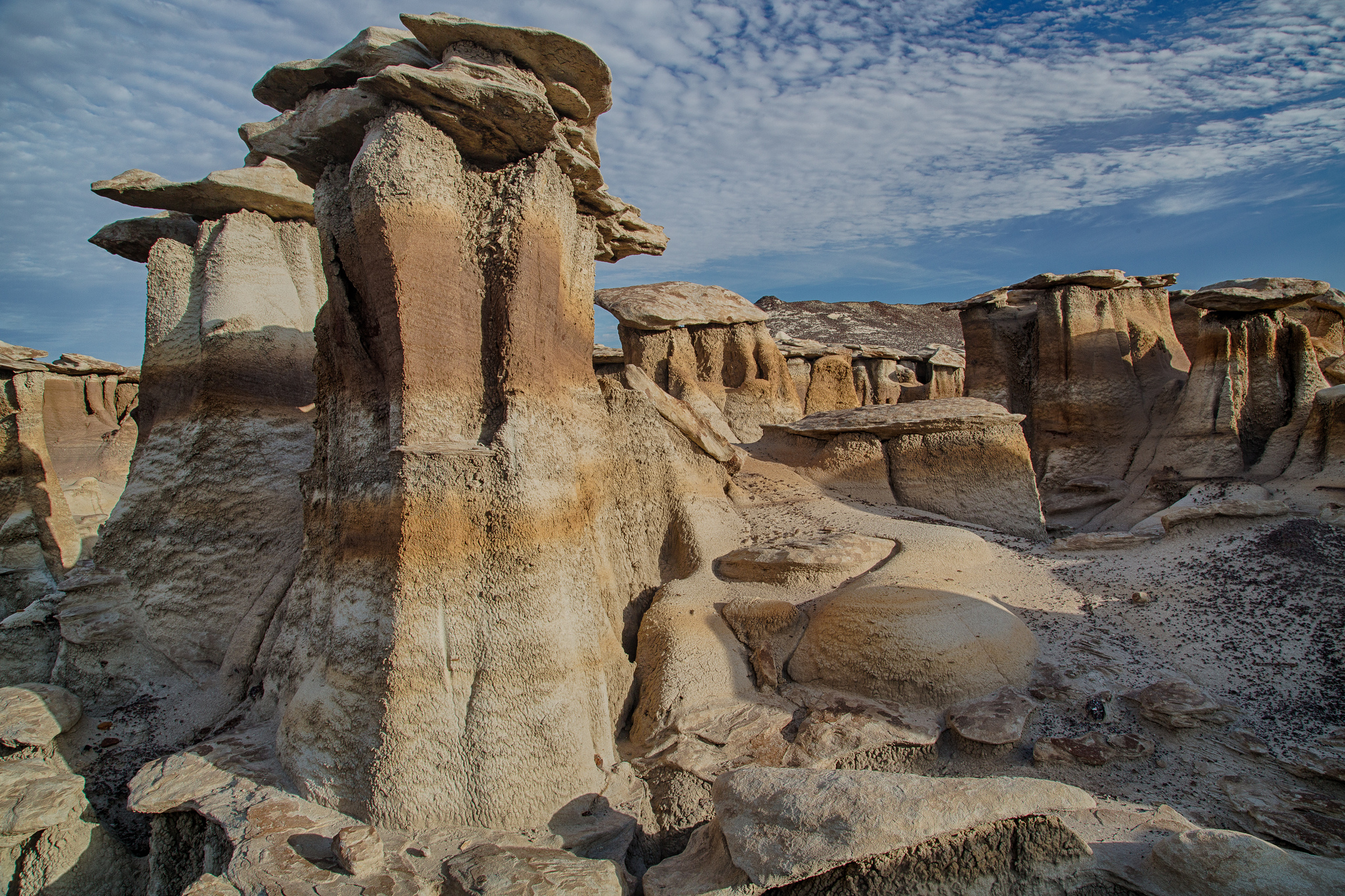

- Location within the United States Location within New Mexico
- Location: San Juan County, New Mexico, U.S.
- Nearest city: Huerfano, New Mexico
- Coordinates: 36°18′16″N 108°07′05″W
- Area: 45,000 acres (18,000 ha)
- Established: 1984
- Governing body: Bureau of Land Management
- Website: Bisti/De-Na-Zin Wilderness

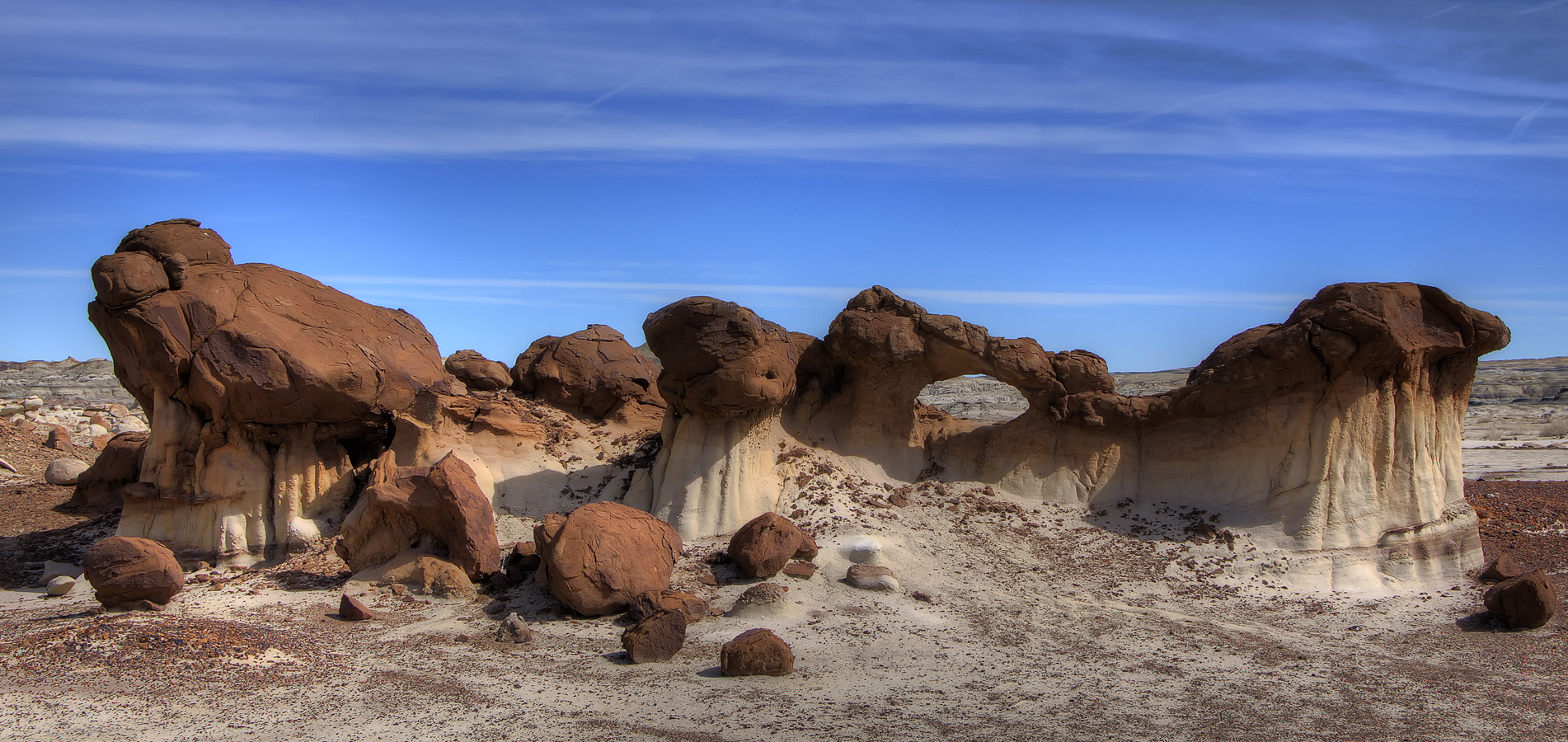
Bisti Badlands

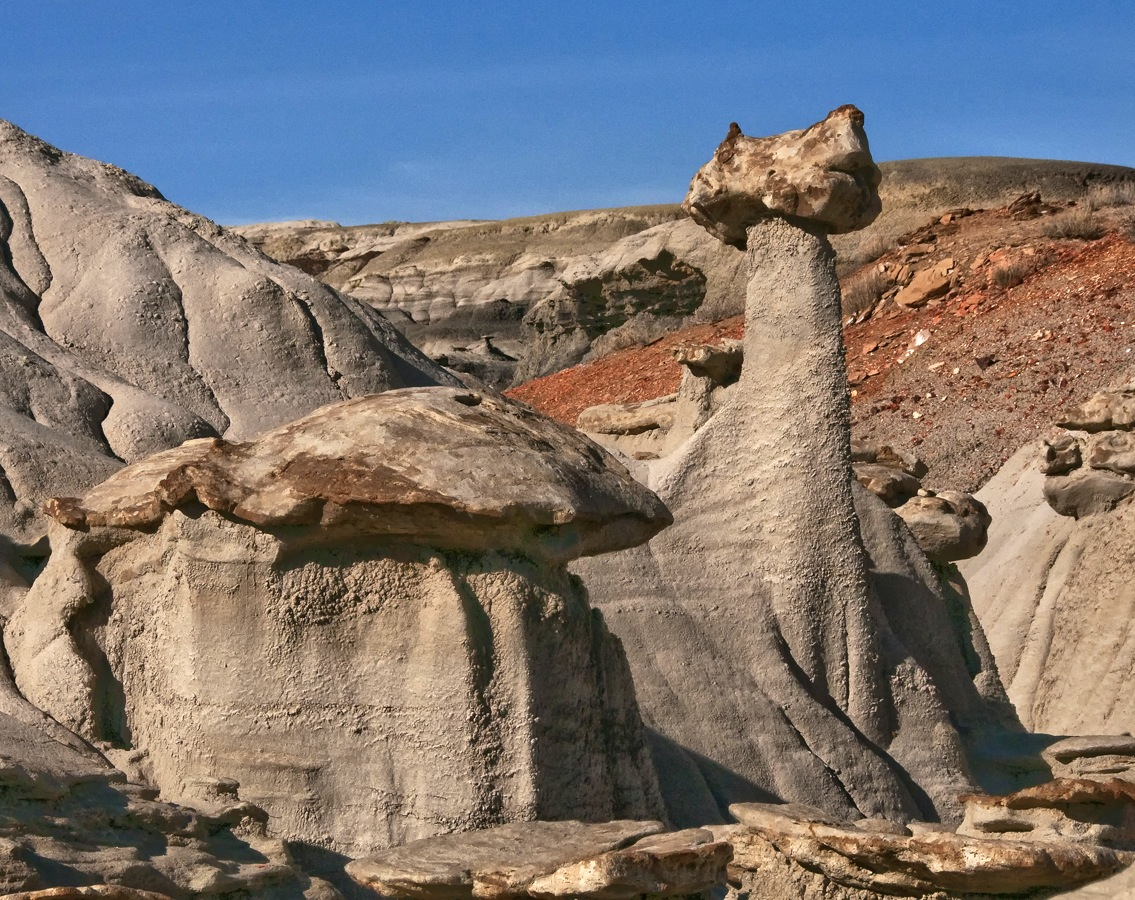
A formation shaped like a sphinx in Bisti Badlands

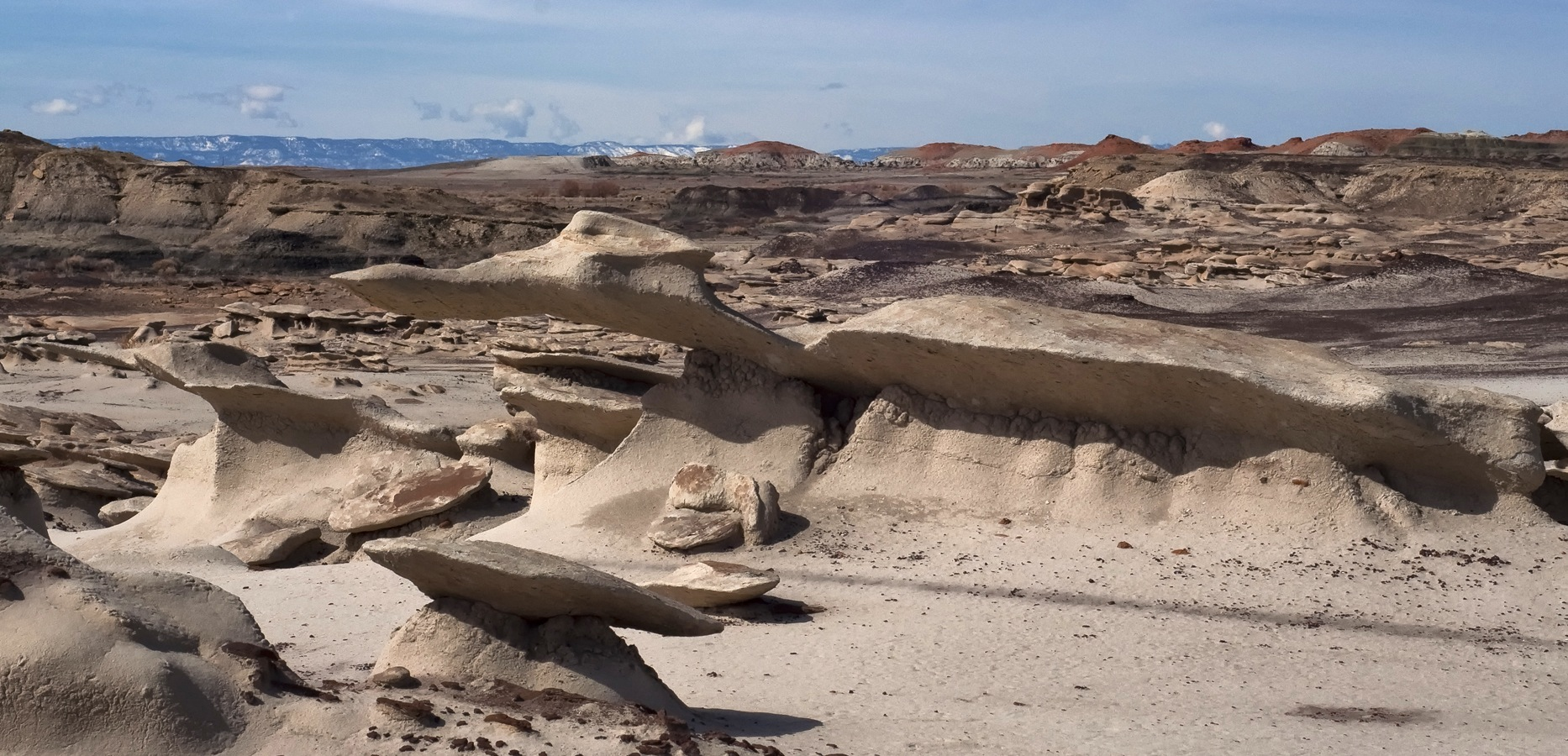
More strange shapes in the Bisti Badlands

The Bisti/De-Na-Zin Wilderness is a 45,000-acre (18,000 ha) wilderness area located in San Juan County in the U.S. state of New Mexico. Established in 1984, the Wilderness is a desolate area of steeply eroded badlands managed by the Bureau of Land Management, except three parcels of private Navajo land within its boundaries. The John D. Dingell Jr. Conservation, Management, and Recreation Act, signed March 12, 2019, expanded the Bisti/De-Na-Zin Wilderness by approximately 2,250 acres.

Translated from the Navajo word Bistahí, Bisti means "among the adobe formations". De-Na-Zin, from Navajo Dééł Náázíní, translates as "Standing Crane". Petroglyphs of cranes have been found south of the Wilderness. It is on the Trails of the Ancients Byway, one of the designated New Mexico Scenic Byways.

== Prehistory ==
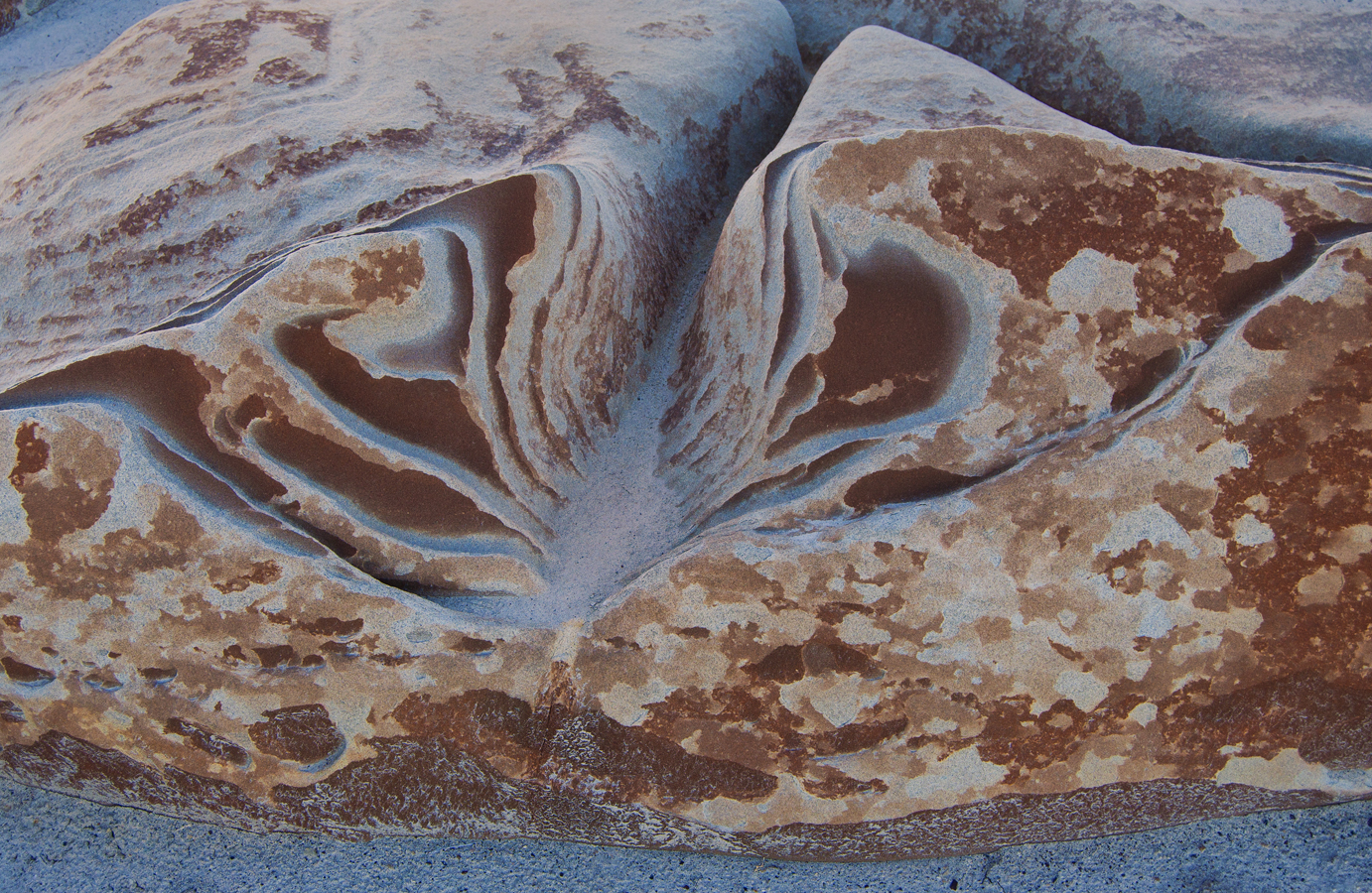
Bisti Abstract

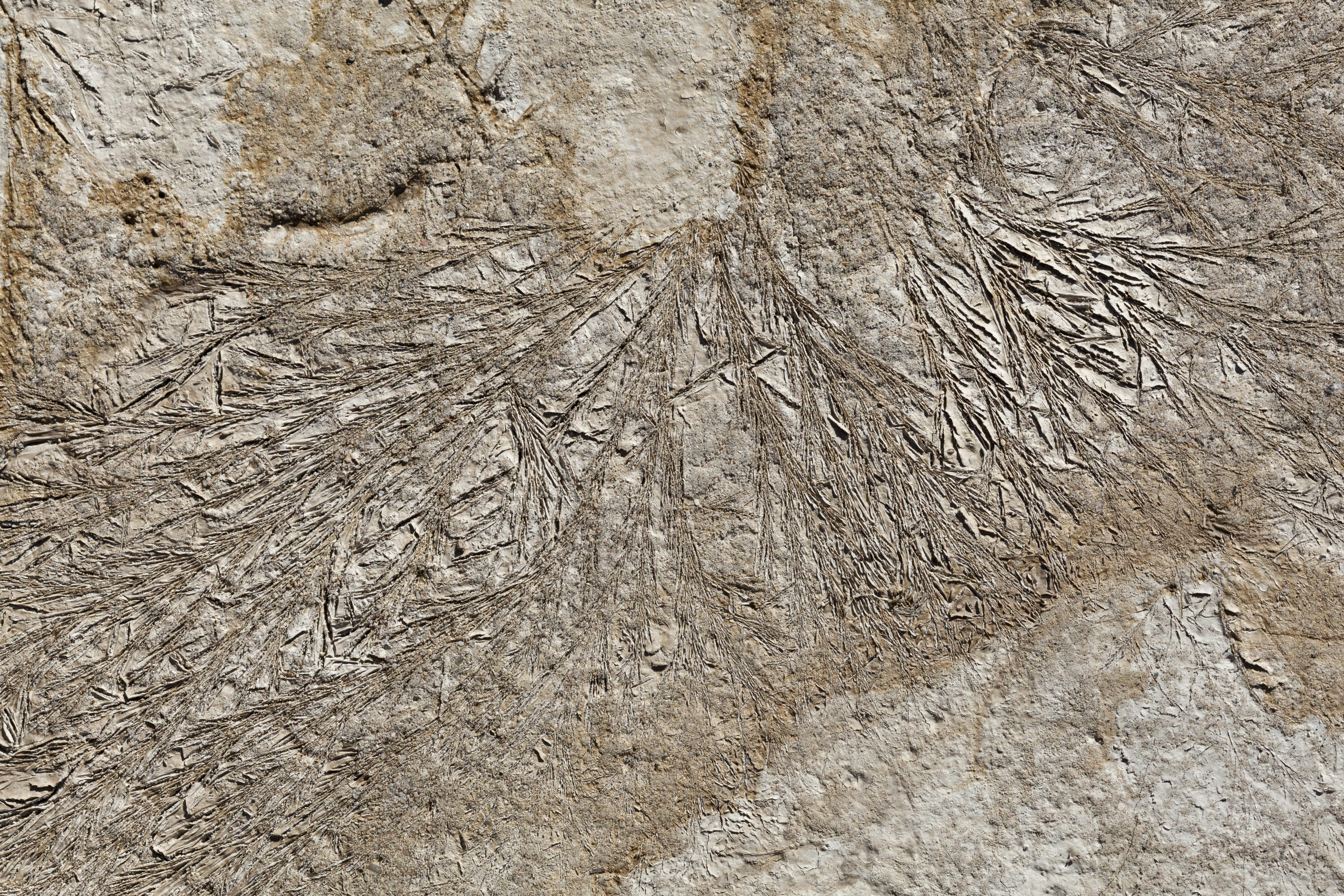
Bisti Badlands. The cause of this pattern is unknown.

The Bisti/De-Na-Zin Wilderness is the largest area of badlands in the San Juan Basin that is easily accessible to the public. The badlands expose the longest, most complete, and most richly fossiliferous sequence of beds spanning the Cretaceous-Paleogene boundary in any single sedimentary basin in the world. These include four geologic formations, which, in decreasing order of age, are the Fruitland Formation, the Kirtland Formation, the Ojo Alamo Formation, and the Nacimiento Formation.

These formations are exposed in an area of east-to-west valleys that drain to the Chaco River to the south. The beds dip about 5 degrees to the northeast so that the oldest beds (Fruitland Formation) are exposed to the southwest, where they are easily visible around the entrance area, while the youngest (Nacimiento Formation) are exposed to the northeast.

In the late Cretaceous, North America was divided by the Western Interior Seaway, whose western shoreline moved back and forth across what are now the mountain states of the United States. About 74 million years ago, the sea made its final retreat from the Bisti/De-Na-Zin area to the northeast, depositing the Fruitland Formation on top of the shoreline sandstone of the Pictured Cliffs Formation (which is exposed south of the Bisti/De-Na-Zin Wilderness.) The Fruitland Formation records flood plains and delta environments behind the receding shoreline, including swamps in which economical deposits of coal were formed. These are mostly found in the Ne-Nah-ne-zad Member of the Kirtland Formation. As the shoreline continued to recede, the Fossil Forest Member was deposited, which has much less coal but is rich in fossils. At the Bisti/De-Na-Zin Wilderness, the Fruitland Formation consists mostly of gray shales, with thin coal beds and with resistant beds of white sandstones deposited in river channels. The formation also contains brown to purple iron concretions. In some places, the coal caught fire and burned to produce a red, hard rock, called clinker or red dog.

The Kirtland Formation was deposited shortly after the Fruitland Formation, and consists of thick greenish shales and siltstones, with just a few thin coal beds and white sandstone beds. The lower part of this formation is called the Hunter Wash Member and is bounded by a white sandstone bed at its base and a distinctive brown sandstone bed (the Bisti Bed) at its top. Between is drab green siltstone. The middle part of this formation is called the Farmington Sandstone which consists of brown-topped sheets of sandstone. The upper part of the formation is called the De-na-zin Member and is similar to the Hunter Wash Member, but with purple beds near its top. The sandstone of the Farmington Member reflects a time of uplift somewhere nearby, producing high ground from which coarse sediments were eroded. Dinosaurs and other fossils are found scattered throughout the Kirtland Formation. Some 200 species of plant or animal fossils have been identified in the combined Fruitland and Kirland Formations, most of which are found in the Bisti/De-Na-zin Wilderness. The plant fossils include petrified logs, leaf impressions, and carbonized leaves.

The Ojo Alamo Formation records the interval immediately around the Cretaceous-Paleogene boundary. Its lower beds are the Naashoibito Member, which is purple mudstone and white sandstone and were deposited before the end of the Cretaceous. This has sometimes been regarded as part of the Kirtland Formation. The upper part of the formation is the Kimbeto Member, which is massive cliff-forming brown sandstone. These coarse sediments were deposited at a time when mountains were being uplifted in southwestern Colorado, accompanied by volcanic activity. The exact Cretaceous-Paleogene boundary, marked by a thin clay layer in other locations, is missing in a time gap between the two members of the formation. Both members are rich in fossils: The Naashoibito Member contains abundant fossils of dinosaurs, turtles, and crocodiles, while the Kimbeto Member contains much fossil wood. Some dinosaur fossils are also found in the Kimbeto, but these are thought to have been originally formed in the Naashoibito Member, weathered out, and redeposited in the younger Kimbeto Member. Such fossils are called reworked fossils.

The Ojo Alamo Formation records a time when the Bisti/De-Na-Zin Wilderness was a seasonal tropical forest in which a wide variety of species grew, but in which angiosperms (flowering plants) were dominant. Two groups of herbivorous dinosaurs dominated the area. These were the hadrosaurs (such as Parasaurolophus) and the ceratopsians (such as Pentaceratops and Bisticeratops). Other herbivores included ankylosaurs and pachycephalosaurs. Meat-eaters included Tyrannosaurus, Daspletosaurus, and Ornithomimus. Small mammals, including multituberculates, marsupials, and placental mammals, were present. After the Cretaceous-Paleogene mass extinction, the dinosaurs were gone, replaced mostly by small mammals. Turtles, crocodiles, and lizards also survived. The multituberculates were much less important.

The Ojo Alamo Formation grades into the Nacimiento Formation, which is candy-striped white and black beds of shale and sandstone with occasional thin beds of coal and thin red or green beds representing paleosols, preserved ancient soil surfaces. These are assigned to the Arroyo Chijuillita Member. These were deposited in a river system with a cooler and drier but very stable climate. The beds contain fossils of the earliest animals of the Paleocene, and define the Puercan and Torrejonian North American Land Mammal Stages on the geologic time scale. These fossils record a time when the mammal population rapidly changed, either from rapid evolution following the Cretaceous-Paleogene extinction event or from new populations of mammals migrating into the area.

The area became part of the western side of the San Juan Basin which formed during the Laramide orogeny and tilted the beds to their present 5-degree angle to the northeast. The badlands themselves formed quite recently, between 2800 and 5600 thousand years ago. Hoodoos formed where resistant rock protected underlying pinnacles of softer rock.

== Wildlife ==
A small variety of wildlife can be found in the Bisti/De-Na-Zin Wilderness, including cottontail rabbit, coyote, badger, porcupine, and prairie dog. Bird species include pinyon jay, raven, quail, dove, ferruginous hawk, prairie falcon, and golden eagle. Lizard, snake, tarantula, and scorpion also live here.

== Recreation ==
Recreational activities in the Bisti/De-Na-Zin Wilderness include hiking, camping, wildlife viewing, photography, and horseback riding. Campfires are forbidden in the Wilderness.

== In popular culture ==
The climax of the 1977 William Friedkin film Sorcerer was filmed in the Bisti Badlands.

== See also ==
- Ah-Shi-Sle-Pah Wilderness
- Chaco Culture National Historical Park
- Đavolja Varoš
- Kasha-Katuwe Tent Rocks National Monument
- Bryce Canyon National Park
- List of U.S. Wilderness Areas
- Wilderness Act
- Demoiselles Coiffées de Pontis
- List of rock formations
- Hoodoo (geology)
