= Demoiselles Coiffées de Pontis =

Rock formation in France

- Rock formation
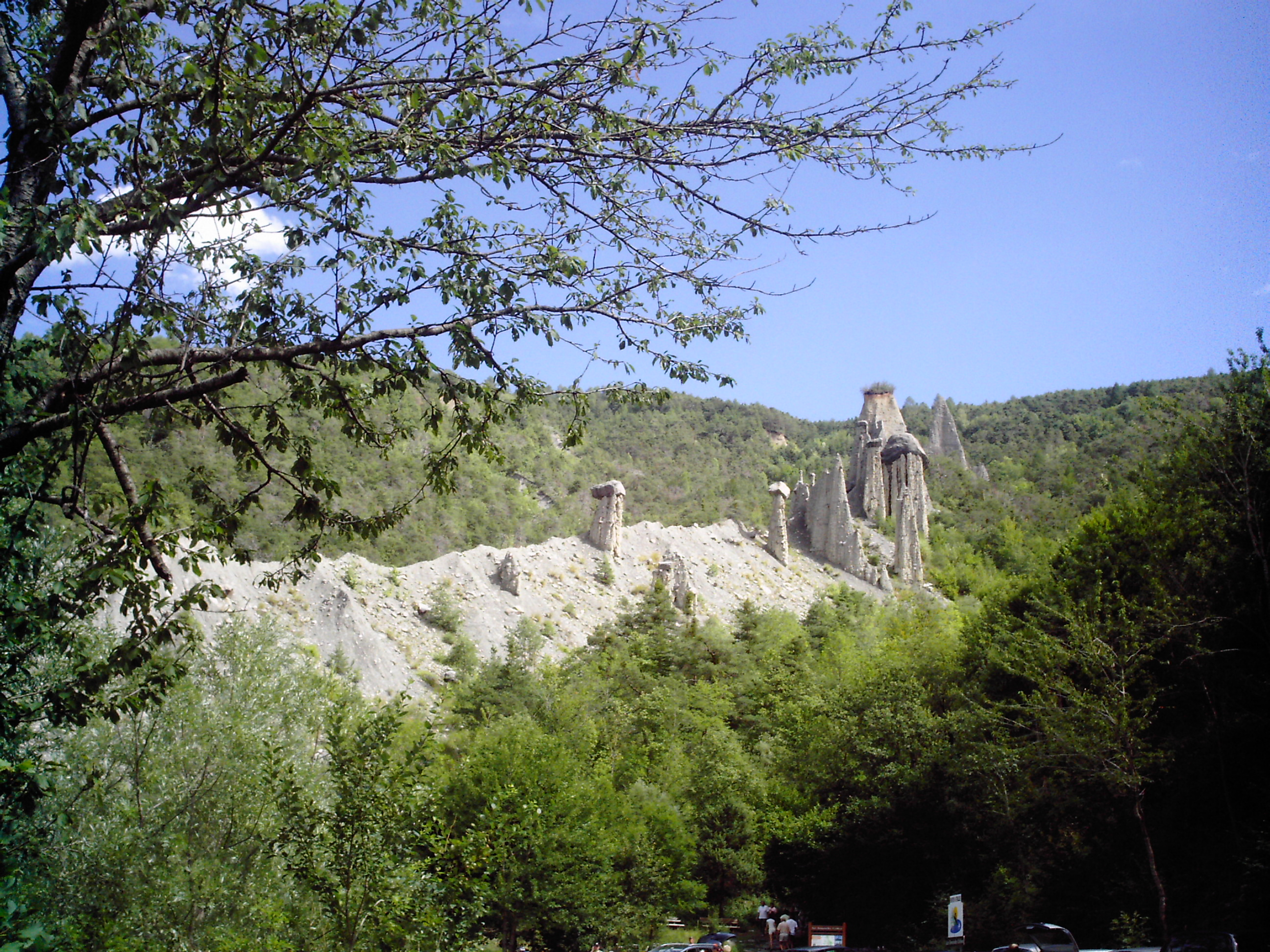

- Coordinates: 44°30′15″N 6°21′00″E
- Location: Pontis, Alpes-de-Haute-Provence, France

The Demoiselles Coiffées de Pontis is a rock formation in Pontis, near Embrun in the French Alps, located on the edge of the Lac de Serre-Ponçon. The formation consists of a number of hoodoos, described as a "set of narrowly-tapered rock columns....topped with a large rock balanced neatly on the tip." In French, such structures are referred to as Demoiselles Coiffées ("ladies with hats"), or more often Cheminées de Fées ("fairy chimneys"). In Théus, there is a concentration referred to as La Salle de Bal des Demoiselles Coiffées ("the ballroom of ladies with hats"), although these structures also exist in isolation. Two other significant sites exist 1 kilometer away on a mountainside near Remollon.

The ballroom is one of the best-known and most attractive examples in France of the structure; an earlier commentator referred to them as "some fifty bizarre columns with hairdos."

The Tour de France has used the road past the Demoiselles Coiffées de Pontis on the last mountain stage (July 20) of the 2017 tour and in 2024 (18 July). The Tour visited the location again in 2024 (July 18).

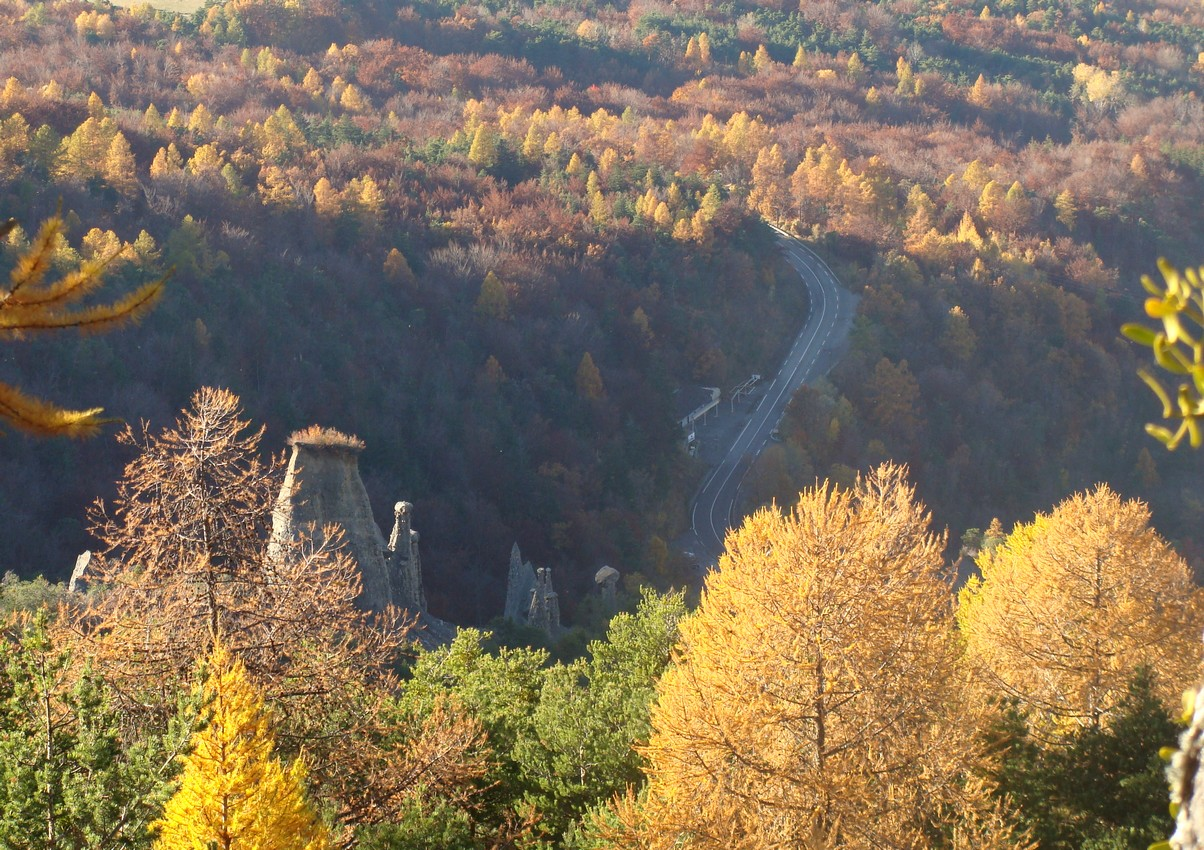
View from above.

== Formation ==
These structures arose out of Würmian moraines: heterogenous, non-stratified, and poorly consolidated conglomerate. When erosion exposed a resistant block, water would run around it and erode the finer periphery, leaving a pedestal below that resistant point. The summit acts as an umbrella, preventing the structure from being further eroded by rain. The water contained mineral salts which hardened and calcified the columns.

== See also ==
- Ah-Shi-Sle-Pah Wilderness Study Area
- Đavolja Varoš
- Bisti/De-Na-Zin Wilderness
- Kasha-Katuwe Tent Rocks National Monument
- Bryce Canyon National Park
- Devil's Chimney (Gloucestershire)
- List of rock formations
- Hoodoo (geology)
