= Đavolja Varoš =

Protected area of Serbia

- IUCN category III (natural monument or feature)
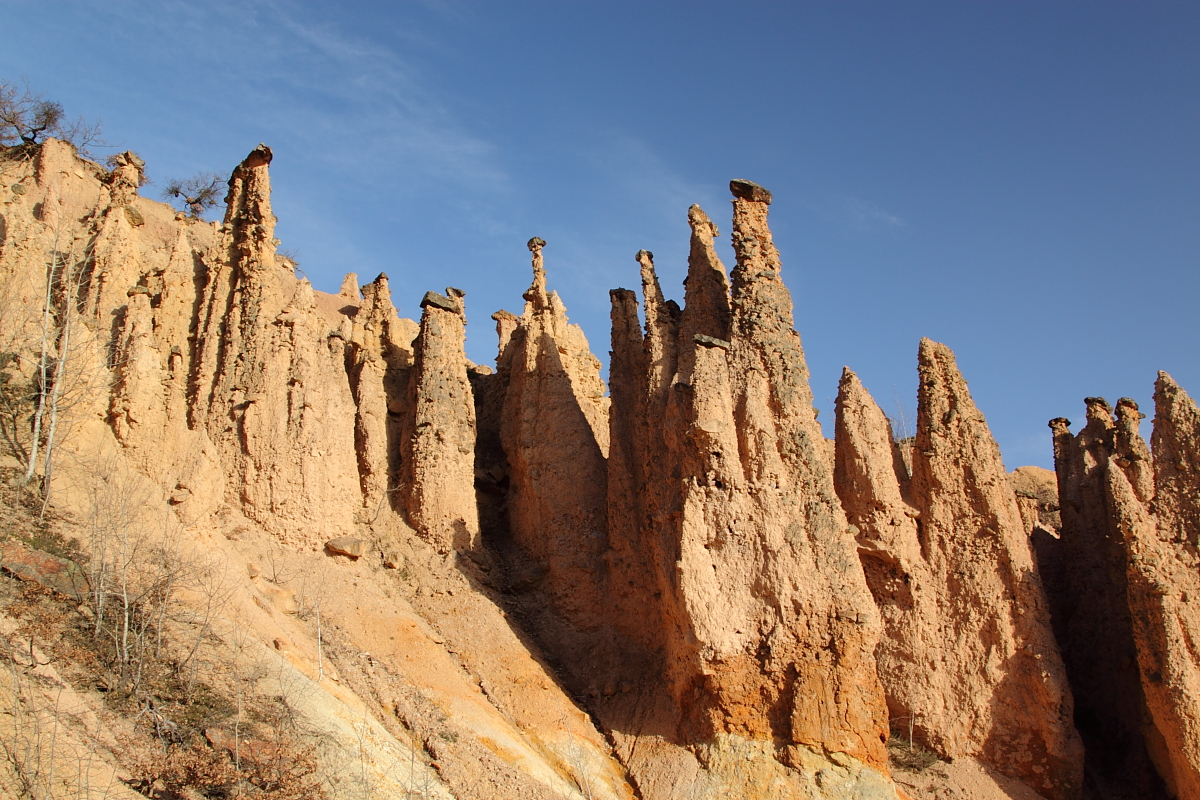
- Đavolja Varoš
- Interactive map of Đavolja Varoš
- Location: Toplica, Serbia
- Coordinates: 42°59′33″N 21°24′26″E
- Area: 0.67 km^{2} (0.26 sq mi)
- Elevation: 700 m (2,300 ft)
- Website: www.djavoljavaros.com

Đavolja Varoš (Serbian Cyrillic: Ђавоља варош, lit. "Devil's Town") is a rock formation consisting of about 200 earth pyramids or "towers", located in southern Serbia on the Radan Mountain, in the municipality of Kuršumlija. There are several similar geological formations in the world, but Đavolja Varoš has the most numerous and the tallest "towers".

== Location ==
Đavolja Varoš is located some 30 kilometres (19 mi) southeast of Kuršumlija, on the southwestern slopes of the Radan mountain. Administratively, it is situated on the territory of Đake village.

== Geology ==
The formations were scientifically examined and described in 1955 by Tomislav Rakićević. Đavolja Varoš features 202 exotic formations described as earth pyramids or "towers", as the locals refer to them. They are 2 to 15 m (6 ft 7 in to 49 ft 3 in) tall and 4 to 6 m (13 to 20 ft) wide at the base. These formations were created by strong erosion of the soil that was scene of intense volcanic activity millions of years ago. Most of the towers have "caps" or "heads" of andesite, which protect them from further erosion.

Volatile volcanic history left marks in the multicolored rocks in the tower's hinterlands. However, Đavolja Varoš in its modern form is a relatively new feature. As the inhabitants of the surrounding region were cutting down the forests, they enabled for the precipitation to erode the rocks. Thus the appearance of the towers and their number constantly changes, with some crumbling and disappearing, and the new ones being formed. In contrast to the barren rocks, the area is surrounded by the thick beech forest.

The area beneath the towers is called The Hell gully (Paklena jaruga) and the surrounding terrain is a location of the mine shafts from the medieval Nemanjić Serbia. King Uroš I invited Saxon miners in the 13th century to develop mining in Serbia. On this locality, they mined iron, copper and aluminium, and to lesser extend gold and silver. There are four mining shafts, of which only one, 800 metres (2,600 ft) long, was surveyed. The mining complex is known as the Saxon mines, or Saski rudnici in Serbian, as the medieval Saxons were called Sasi by the Serbs.

A natural spring is located beneath the formations and has a high mineral concentration. There are two springs: Đavolja voda (Devil's Water), with extremely acidic water (pH 1.5) and high mineral concentration (15 g/L of water), and Crveno vrelo (Red Well). The unusually pungent spring waters were examined for the first time in 1905 by Aleksandar Zega, founder of the Serbian Chemical Society.

== Folklore ==
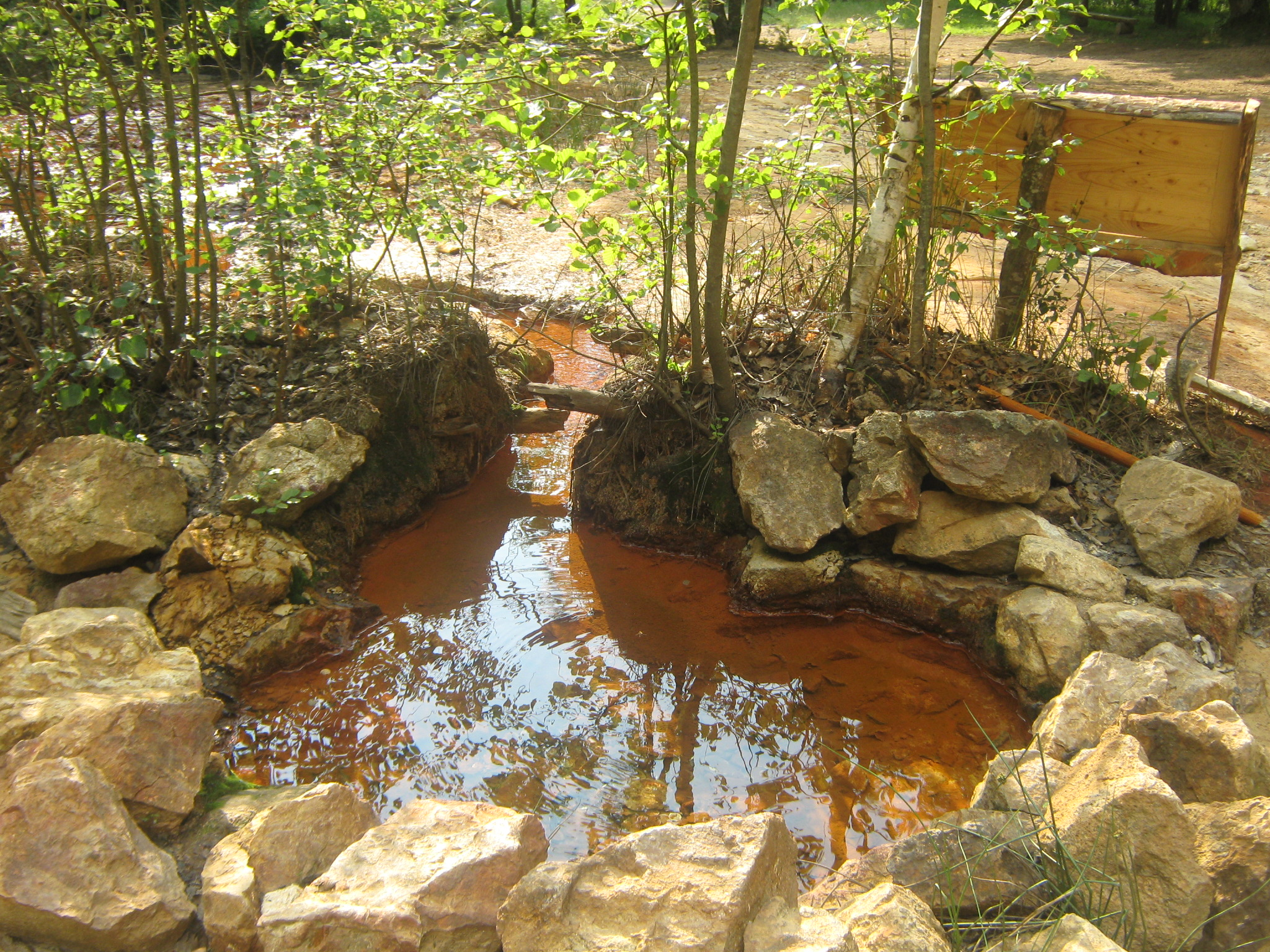
Red Well

Like in the case of some other mountains in Serbia (Povlen, Rtanj, Homolje), the Radan Mountain region is known for abundant folk tales, especially concerning the origin of Đavolja Varoš. According to one of the myths, Radan was a miraculous mountain, inhabited by the fairies, while the people living at the foothills were the most diligent, pious and concordant in the world. Bittered by this harmony, one day the devil sent dark and storm to the mountain, with lightnings striking one after another, and thunders causing landslides. After people took refuge waiting for the storm to pass, the devil himself came down to Earth and enchanted the water well (hence today's acidic spring's name Devil's water), casting a spell that everyone who drinks from it will lose his mind. Both the devil and the storm then disappeared.

It appeared as if everything returned to normal after this, but people changed. Under a spell, a brother and sister fell in love, and a wedding party with 200 members gathered. Fairies from the Radan adored the villagers for what they were but were unable to break devil's spell. They asked God for help to prevent the wedding, and on the wedding day, right at noon, a flare, "shinier than Sun" hit the foothills. In a second, the forest was vaporized, and the wedding members were turned into rocks. Since then, per the folk lore, rocks from the site should be left alone, as those who take it with them will be turned into stone, too.

Another myth says that a witch lived on the Radan. She was willing to fulfil people's wishes, but was always asking for a favor in return, when the time of need comes. All those who tried to trick her, or to hide from her, were turned into stone by her and buried under towers. On the "shortest night ever, while the falling stars fill the stream and mighty moon shines the sky", emerging, red sun will melt the towers liberating those buried underneath. This will be a sign that the witch returned and that they must fulfil her favors.

Myths aren't reserved only for the origin of Đavolja Varoš, but also for the mines and the church. Claims are that in the deepest night, from the three still closed former mining shafts, you can hear Saxon miners digging the ore inside. The church was built by a thankful, gravely ill man who saw an apparition of Saint Petka in the forest. He spent next seven days on that spot, and on the eighth day woke up completely healed. Preserving this seven-day period, Church today produces lucky stones, which are kept in the church for seven days. Church also gives pieces of white clothes. With it, people touch sore spot and make a recovery wish. The cloth is then tied to one of the three trees surrounding the church, and on the seventh day they are untied and buried in the ground, "taking illness with it".

== Protection ==
Since 1959, Đavolja Varoš has been protected by the state and a 1995 decision of the Serbian Government declared it a major natural monument subject to category one protection. Đavolja Varoš was a nominee in the New Seven Wonders of Nature campaign.

It is visited by 50,000 tourists yearly, but the touristic capacities are still undeveloped. There are two restaurants in the vicinity, "Đavolja Varoš", and a bit further "Dva Ambara". A small log cabin church, dedicated to Saint Petka, is right before the rock complex. It was built on the foundation of the older, 13th century church.

== See also ==
- List of rock formations in Serbia
- Stone town of Kuklica, similar formation in Macedonia
- Bisti/De-Na-Zin Wilderness
- Bryce Canyon National Park
- Demoiselles Coiffées de Pontis
- Hoodoo (geology)
- Kasha-Katuwe Tent Rocks National Monument
