= Hoodoo (geology) =

Tall, thin spire of relatively soft rock usually topped by harder rock

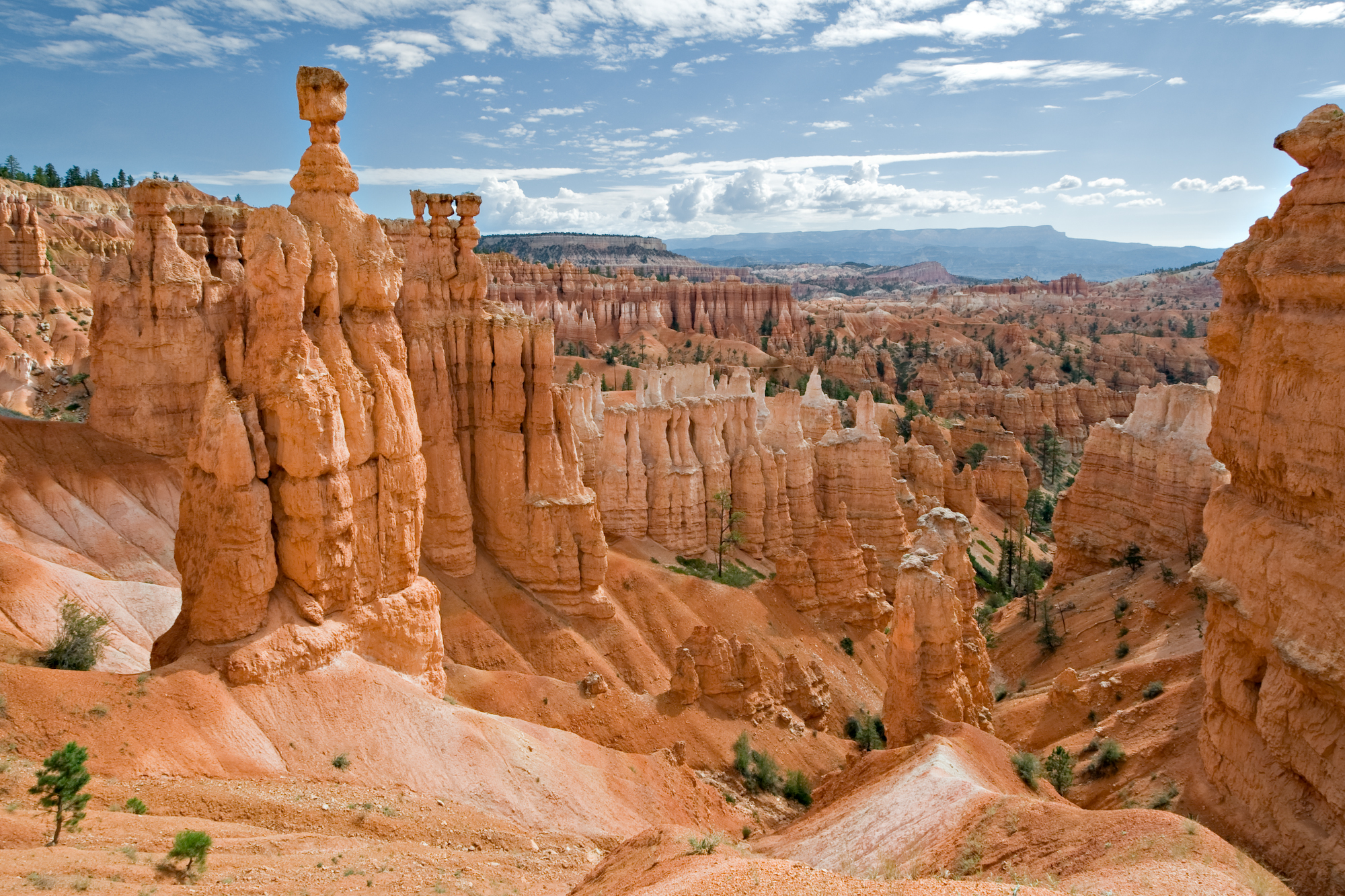
Hoodoos in Bryce Canyon National Park, Utah

A hoodoo (also called a tent rock, fairy chimney, or earth pyramid) is a tall, thin spire of rock formed by erosion. Hoodoos typically consist of relatively soft rock topped by harder, less easily eroded stone that protects each column from the elements. They generally form within sedimentary rock and volcanic rock formations.

Hoodoos range in size from the height of an average human to heights exceeding a 10-story building. Hoodoo shapes are affected by the erosional patterns of alternating hard and softer rock layers. Minerals deposited within different rock types can cause hoodoos to have different colors throughout their height.

== Etymology ==
In certain regions of western North America these rocky structures are called hoodoos, a name that comes from a Southern Paiute word, oo’doo, which implies something that inspires fear. Hoodoos are featured in some traditional legends of Indigenous peoples of the North American Southwest. For example, hoodoos in Bryce Canyon National Park were considered petrified remains of ancient beings who had been sanctioned for misbehavior. Despite the matching spelling, the term for these rock formations is not related to Hoodoo spirituality.

== Occurrence ==
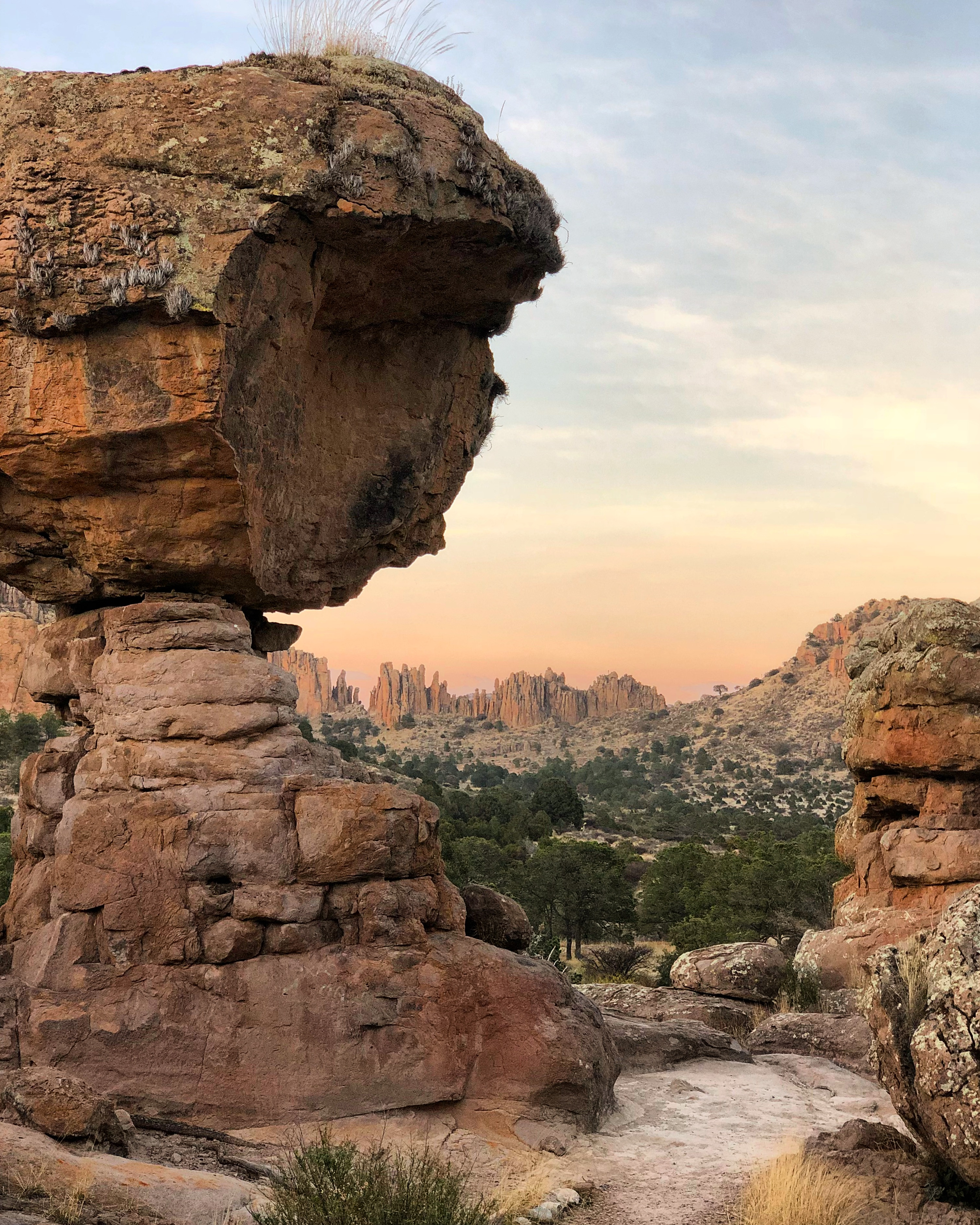
Hoodoos in Sierra de Órganos National Park, Mexico

Hoodoos are found mainly in the desert in dry, hot areas. While visually similar to pinnacles (or spires), hoodoos are unique in their variable thickness, often described as having a totem pole-shaped body. A spire, conversely, has a smoother profile or uniform thickness that tapers from the ground upward.

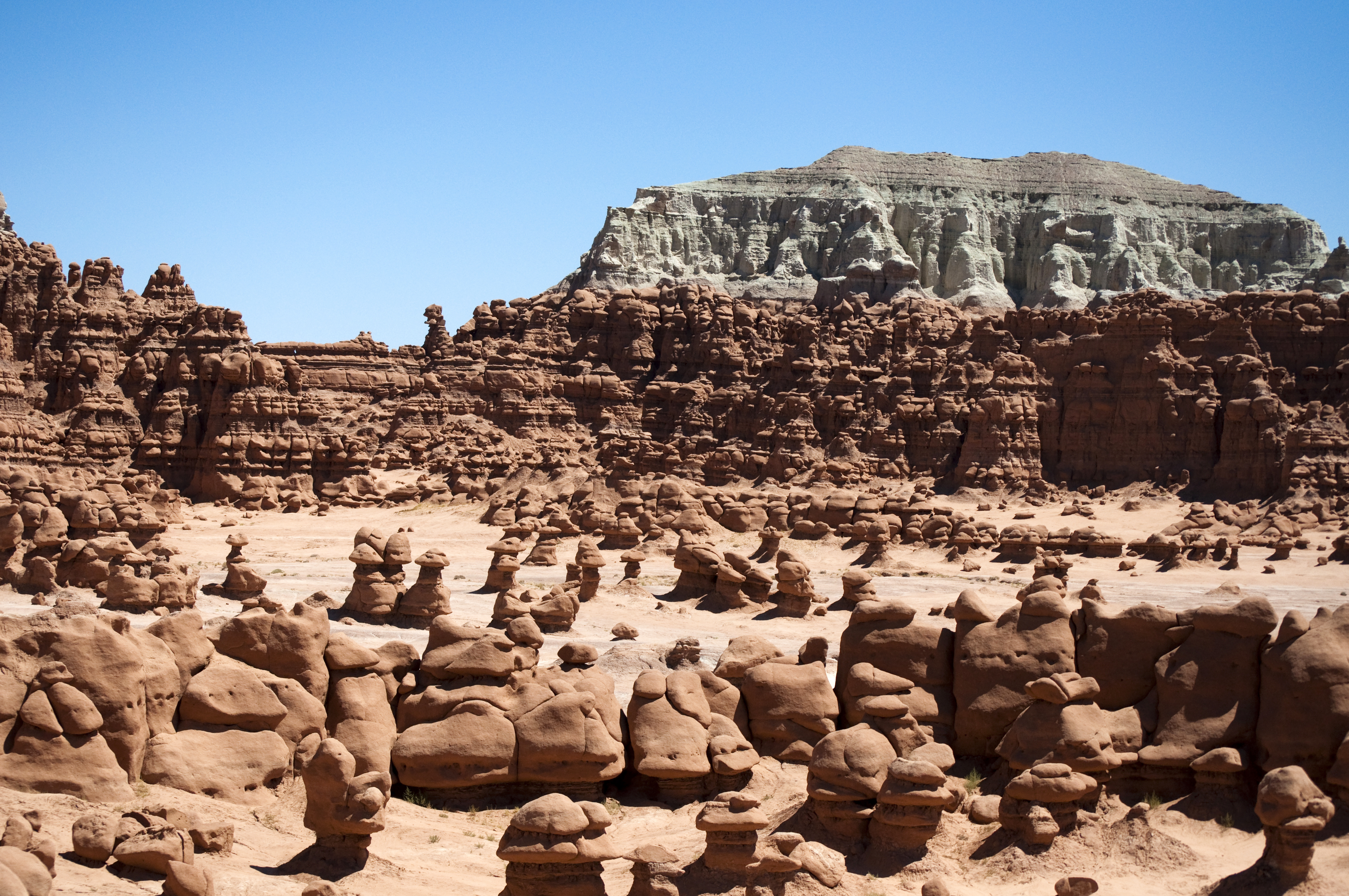
Goblin Valley State Park, Utah

Hoodoo formations are commonly found on the Colorado Plateau and in the Badland regions of the northern Great Plains of North America. While hoodoos are scattered throughout these areas, nowhere in the world are they so abundant as in the northern section of Bryce Canyon National Park in Utah. Hoodoos are also very prominent a few hundred miles away at Goblin Valley State Park on the eastern side of the San Rafael Swell, at Kasha-Katuwe Tent Rocks National Monument in north central New Mexico, and at Chiricahua National Park in Southeast Arizona. Some hoodoos are found in Sombrerete, Mexico at the Sierra de Organos National Park.

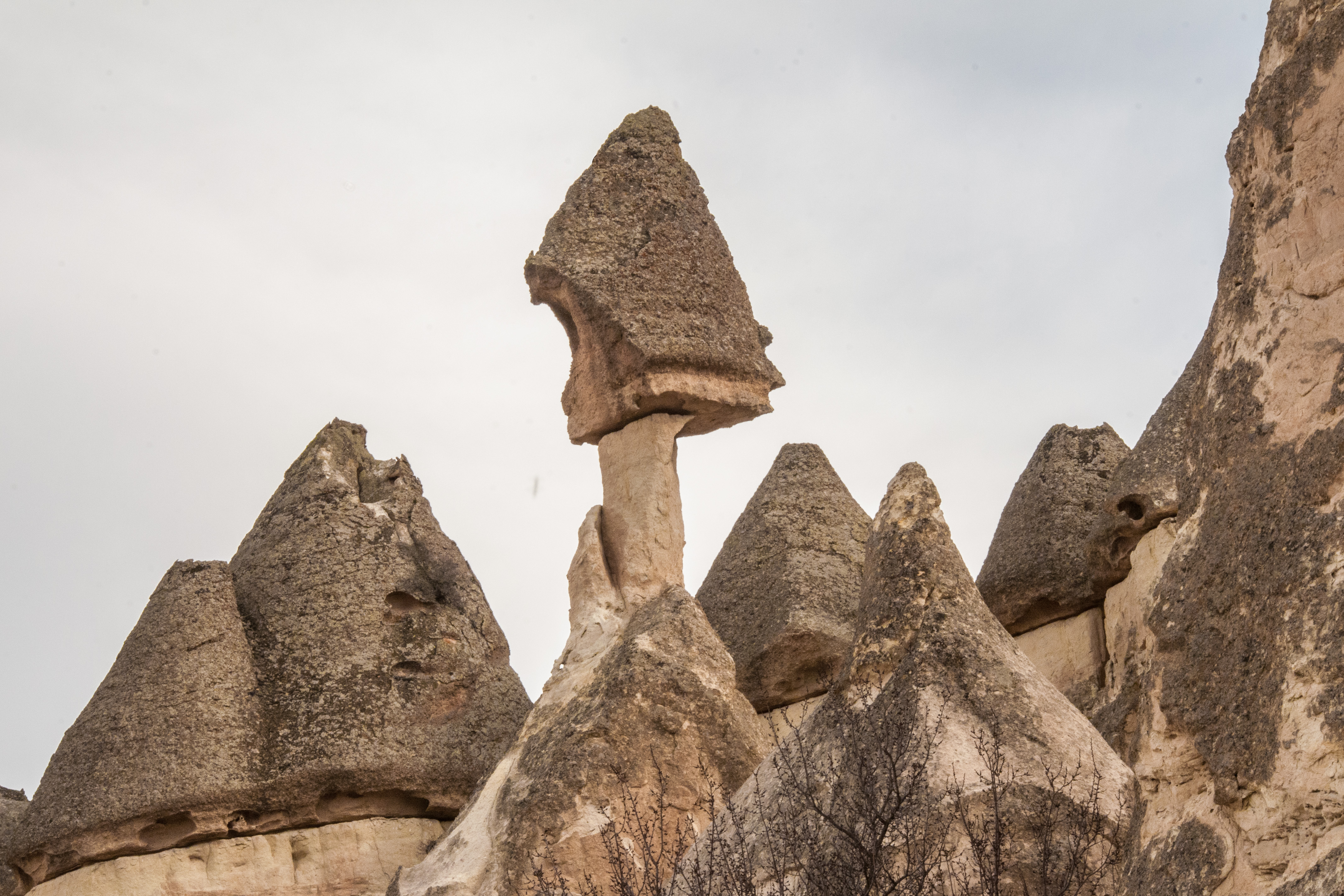
Tent rocks (peribacası) near Çavuşin, Cappadocia, Turkey

Hoodoos are also found in the Cappadocia region of Turkey, where houses have been carved into the formations. These hoodoos were depicted on the reverse of the Turkish 50 new lira banknote of 2005–2009.

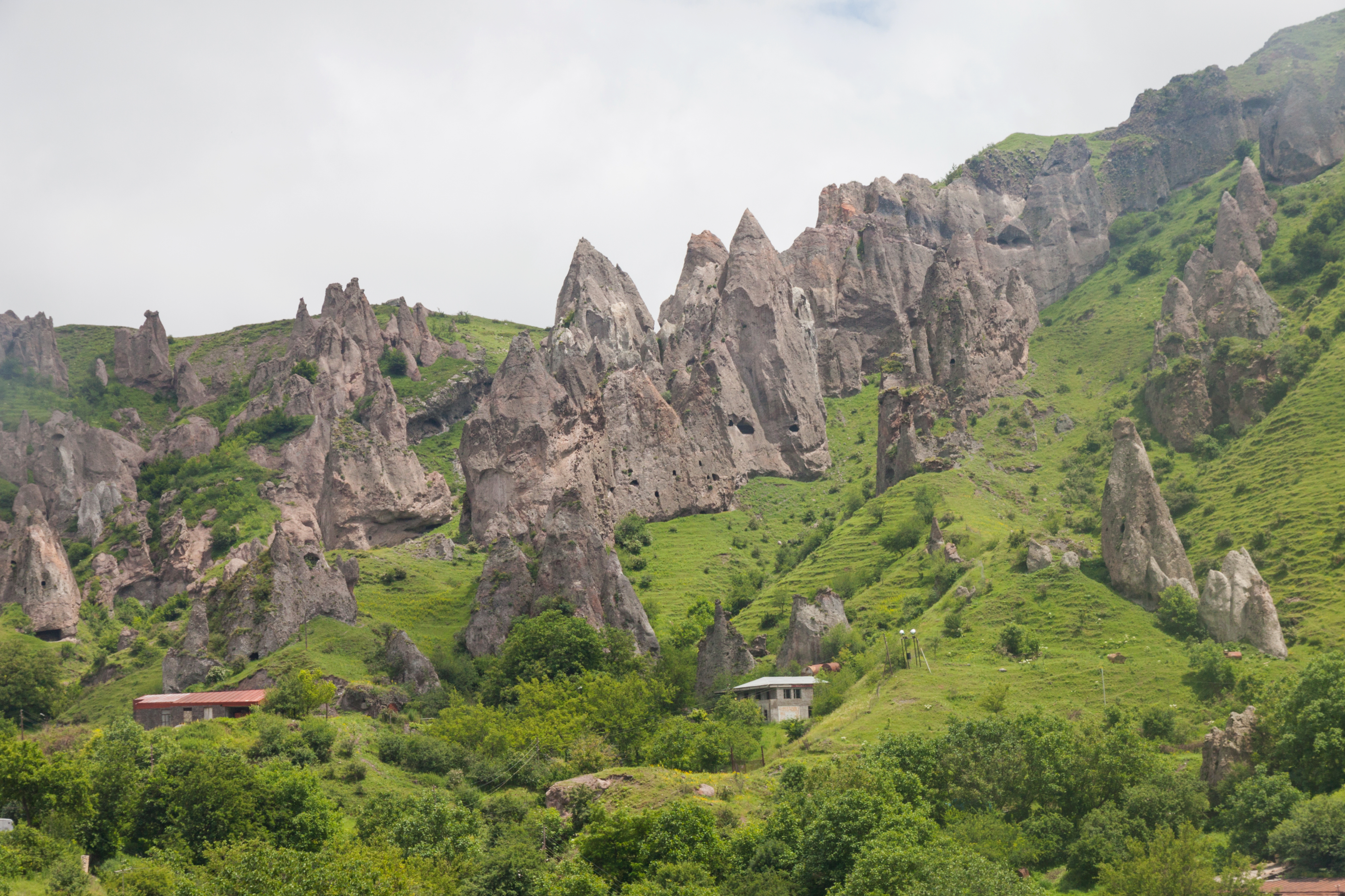
Hoodoos in Hin Khndzoresk, Armenia

In Armenia, hoodoos are found in Goris, Khndzoresk, Hin Khot and several other places in Syunik Province, where many were once carved into and inhabited or used.

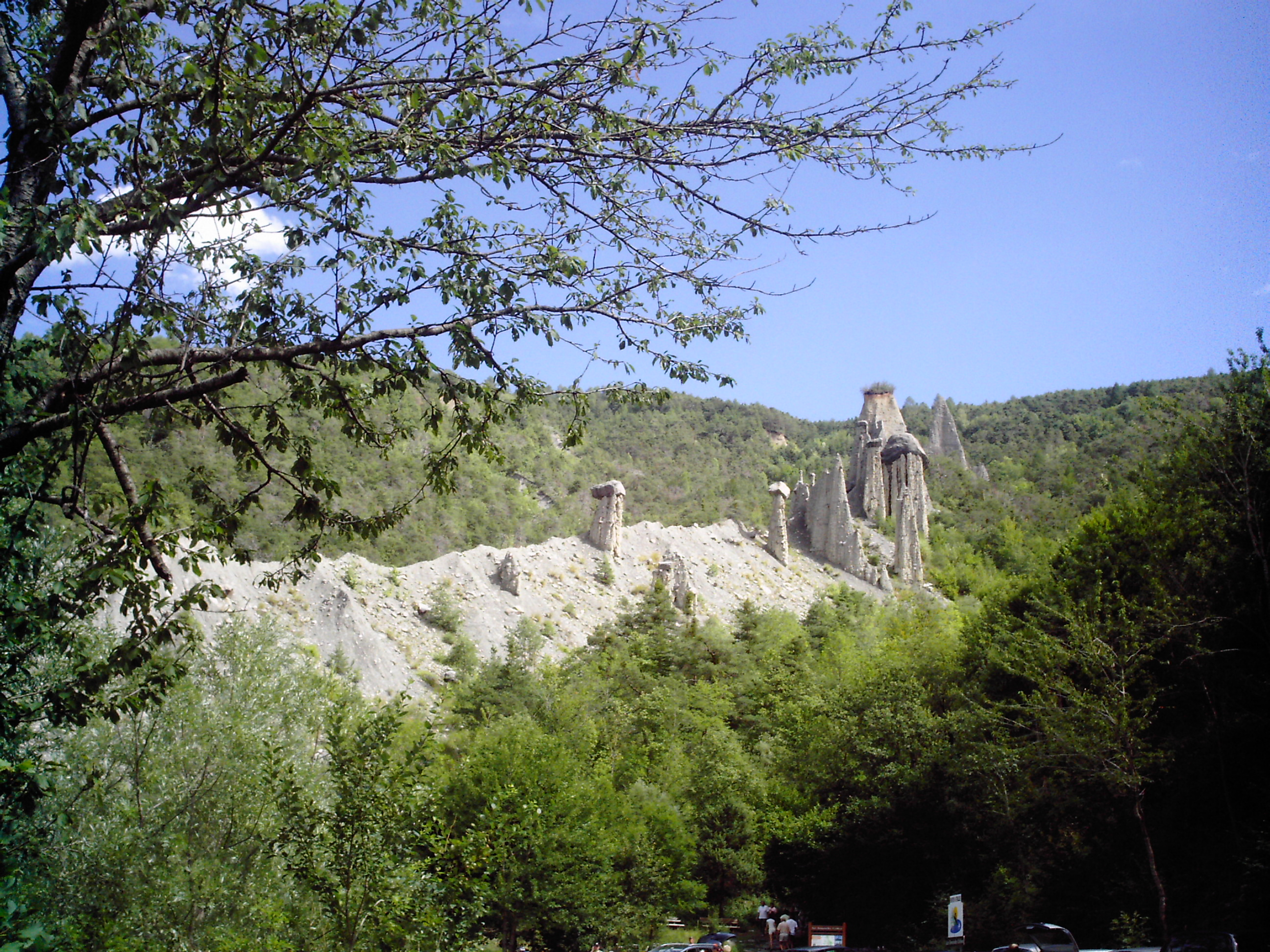
Demoiselles Coiffées de Pontis, southern France

In French, the formations are called demoiselles coiffées (ladies with hairdos) or cheminées de fées (fairy chimneys) and several are found in the Alpes-de-Haute-Provence; one of the best-known examples is the formation called Demoiselles Coiffées de Pontis.

The hoodoo stones of Yehliu on the northern coast of Taiwan are unusual for their coastal setting. The stones formed as the seabed rose rapidly out of the ocean during the Miocene epoch. Efforts have been made to slow the erosion in the case of iconic specimens in Wanli.

The Awa Sand Pillars found in Tokushima Prefecture, Japan, are hoodoos made from layers of compacted gravel and sandstone.

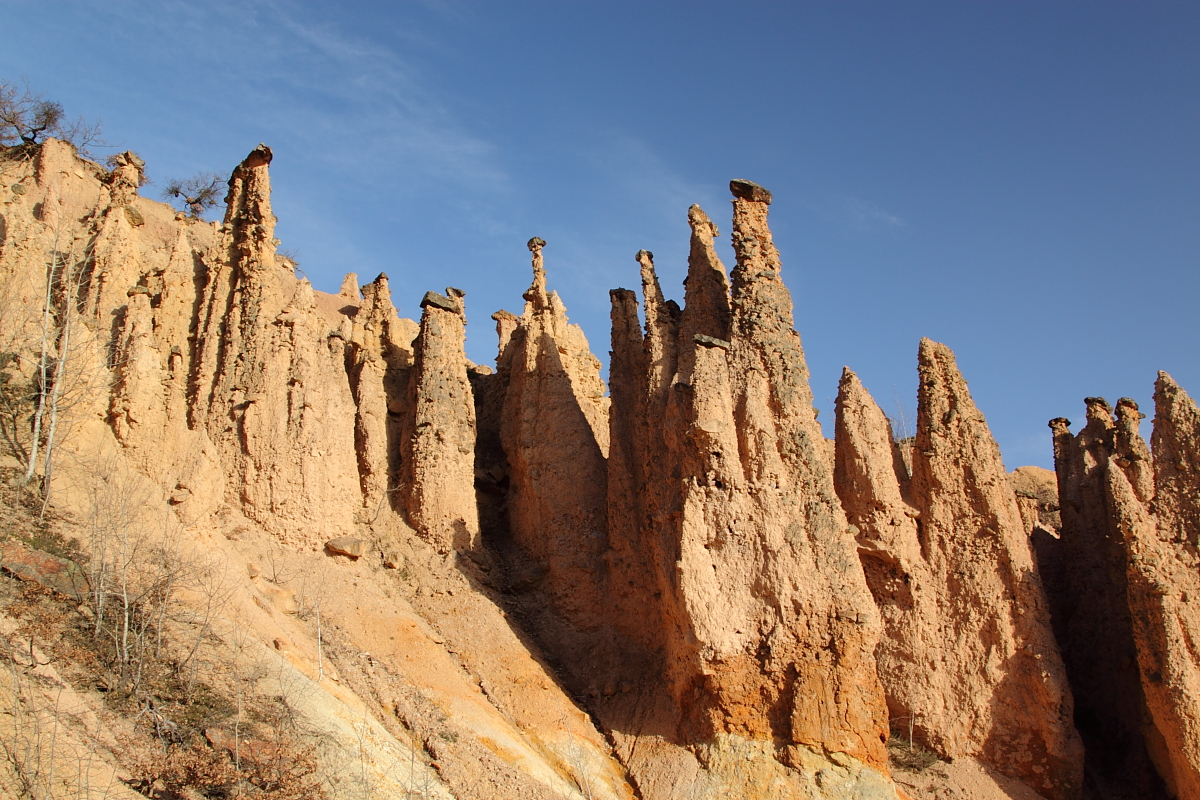
Đavolja Varoš (Devil's Town), Serbia – a volcanic rock formation with andesite caps

Đavolja Varoš (Devil's Town) hoodoos in Serbia feature about 200 formations described as earth pyramids or towers by local inhabitants. Since 1959, Đavolja Varoš has been protected by the state. The site was also a nominee in the New Seven Wonders of Nature campaign.

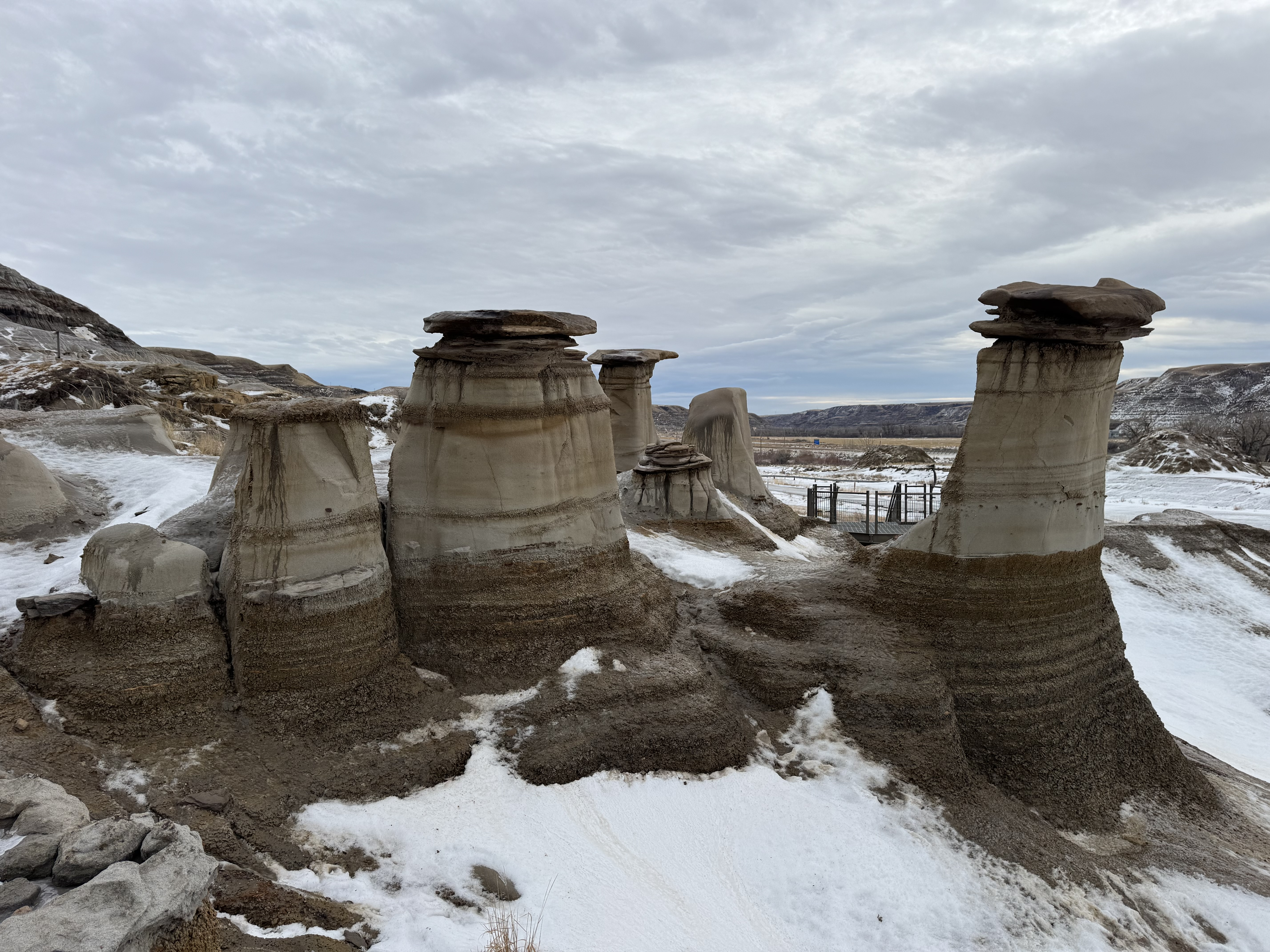
Hoodoos in Drumheller, Alberta

The hoodoos found in Drumheller, Alberta, are composed of clay and sand deposited between 70 and 75 million years ago during the Cretaceous Period. These hoodoos can maintain a unique mushroom-like appearance as the underlying base erodes at a faster rate compared to the capstones at a rate of nearly one centimeter per year, faster than most geologic structures.

The so called bouharia formations at the geological park of Grevena-Kozani, near the village of Mikrovalto, Greece.

Noktaria formations at the geological park of Grevena-Kozani, near the village of Mikrovalto, Greece. The walking path through the geopark is visible in the background.

In north-west Greece, distinctive chimney-like rock pillars, called bouharia, are found in the Grevena-Kozani Geopark, particularly near the village of Mikrovalto. Formed over thousands of years through erosion and weathering, they consist of loosely consolidated sediments topped by protective slate capstones, reaching heights of up to six meters. In the same geological park, sharp ridge formations, called noktaria, rise over ten meters high.

== Formation ==
Hoodoos typically form in areas where a thick layer of a relatively soft rock, such as mudstone, poorly cemented sandstone, or tuff (consolidated volcanic ash), is covered by a thin layer of hard rock, such as well-cemented sandstone, limestone, or basalt. In glaciated mountainous valleys, the soft eroded material may be glacial till with the protective capstones being large boulders in the till. Over time, cracks in the resistant layer allow the much softer rock beneath to be eroded and washed away. Hoodoos form where a small cap of the resistant layer remains, and protects a cone of the underlying softer layer from erosion. The heavy cap pressing downward gives the pedestal of the hoodoo its strength to resist erosion. With time, erosion of the soft layer causes the cap to be undercut, eventually falling off, and the remaining cone is then quickly eroded.

Typically, hoodoos form from weathering processes that continuously work together in eroding the edges of a rock formation known as a fin. For example, the primary weathering force at Bryce Canyon is frost wedging. The hoodoos at Bryce Canyon experience more than 200 freeze-thaw cycles each year. In winter, melting snow in the form of water seeps into cracks and then freezes at night. When water freezes, it expands by almost ten percent, prying open cracks and gradually widening them, similarly to the way a pothole forms in a paved road.

Rain is another weathering process causing this erosion. In most places today, rainwater is slightly acidic, which lets the weak carbonic acid slowly dissolve limestone grain by grain. It is this process that rounds the edges of hoodoos and gives them their lumpy and bulging profiles. Where internal mudstone and siltstone layers interrupt the limestone, the rock is more resistant to the chemical weathering because of the comparative lack of limestone. Many of the more durable hoodoos are capped with a special kind of magnesium-rich limestone called dolomite. Dolomite, being fortified by the mineral magnesium, dissolves at a much slower rate, and consequently protects the weaker limestone underneath it. Rain is also the chief source of erosion that washes away debris. For example, monsoon-type rainstorms travel through the Bryce Canyon region in summer, bringing short-duration high-intensity rain.

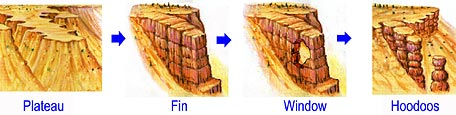
Progressive erosion producing plateau, fin, window (or arch), and hoodoos

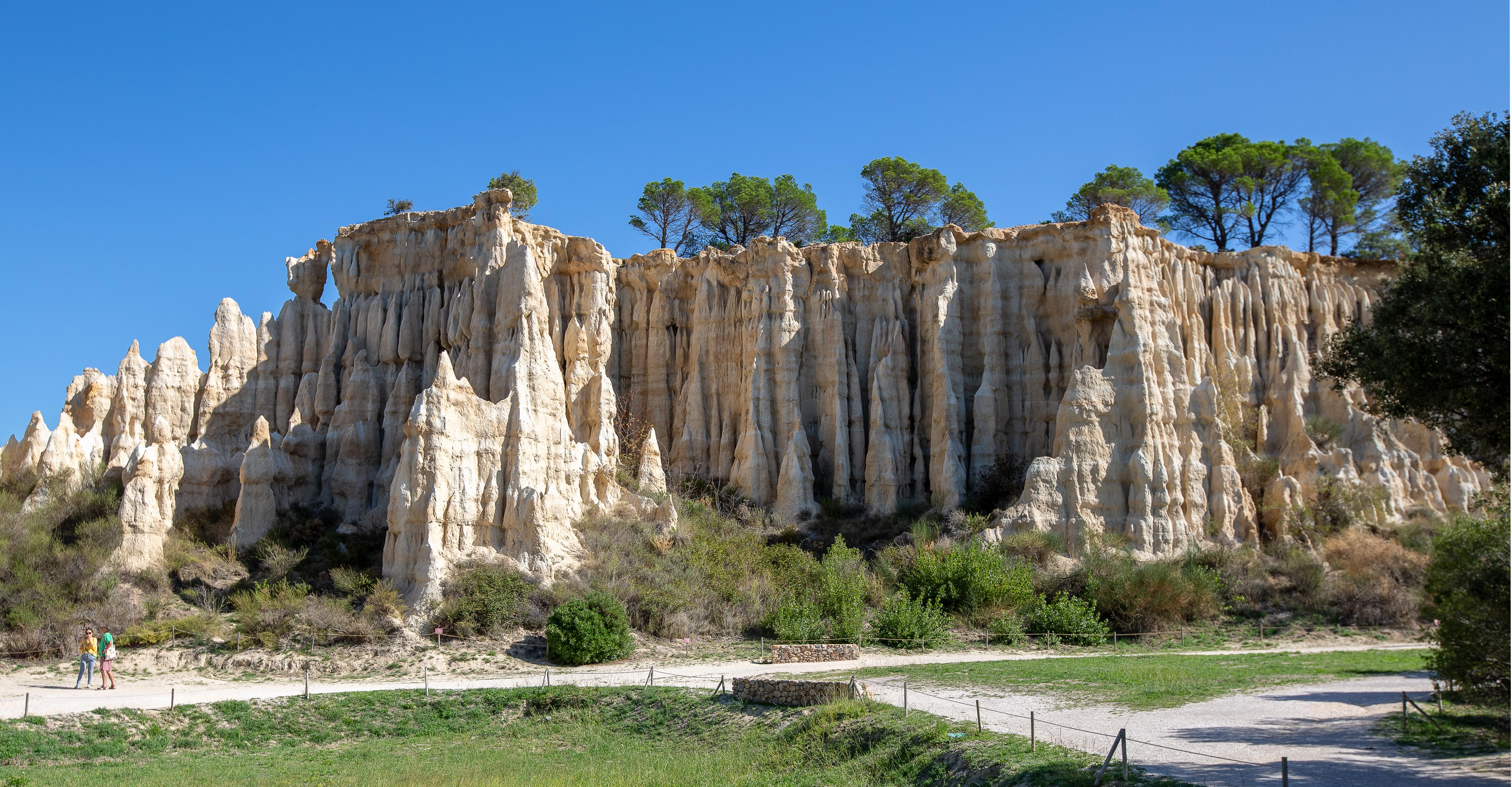
Les Orgues d'Ille-sur-Têt, Southern France

== See also ==
- Balancing rock – Naturally occurring precariously balanced rock
- Bisti/De-Na-Zin Wilderness – Wilderness in New Mexico, United States
- Butte – Isolated hill with steep, often vertical sides and a small, relatively flat top
- Chiricahua National Park – National park in Arizona, U.S.
- City of Rocks State Park – State park in New Mexico, United States
- Ciudad Encantada – Geological site in Castilla–La Mancha, Spain
- Earth pyramids of South Tyrol – Hoodoos in northern Italy, Italy
- Geology of the Bryce Canyon area – Geology of the area in Utah
- Göreme Historical National Park – National park in Nevşehir, Turkey, Cappadocia, Turkey
- Kasha-Katuwe Tent Rocks National Monument – United States National Monument, New Mexico
- List of rock formations
- Mushroom rock – Mushroom-shaped rock formation
- Princess of Hope – Rock formation in Balochistan, Pakistan
- Tsingy de Bemaraha Strict Nature Reserve – Strict nature reserve of Madagascar
- Tulin (geology) – Landform caused by earth movement and erosion
- Yardang – Streamlined aeolian landform
