= Vratna monastery =

Monastery in Serbia

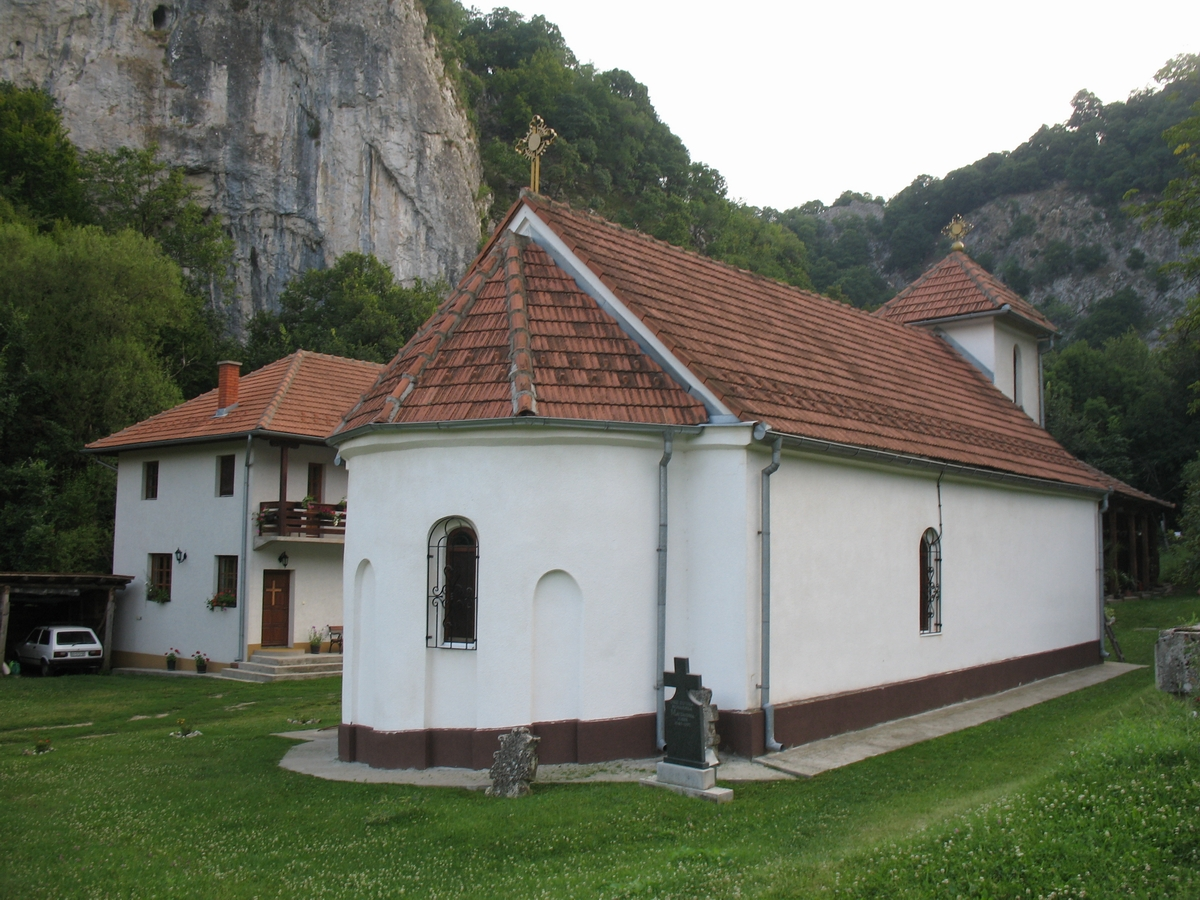
- Interactive map of Vratna monastery

Monastery information
- Full name: Манастир Вратна
- Order: Serbian Orthodox
- Established: 14th century
- Mother house: Bukovo monastery
- Controlled churches: Vratna church^{Lord's Ascension (Spasovdan)}

People
- Founders: Stefan Milutin; Saint Nikodim I

Site
- Location: Vratna, Negotin, Serbia

The Vratna monastery (Serbian: Манастир Вратна, romanized: Manastir Vratna) is a 14th-century Serbian Orthodox monastery in the village of Vratna in Negotin, Serbia, founded by Serbian king Stefan Milutin (1282–1321) of the Nemanjić dynasty and Saint Nikodim I. It is situated below the Vratna canyon and the nearby Vratna river flows through the village.

It was rebuilt in 1415 by Šarban from Struza attested in papers found by bishop Genadije in 1856. The monastery was damaged by fire in 1813 and renovated by 1817.

The monastery was torn down between World War I and World War II. It is since a female monastery (nunnery), one of three monasteries in Negotin.

== Gallery ==
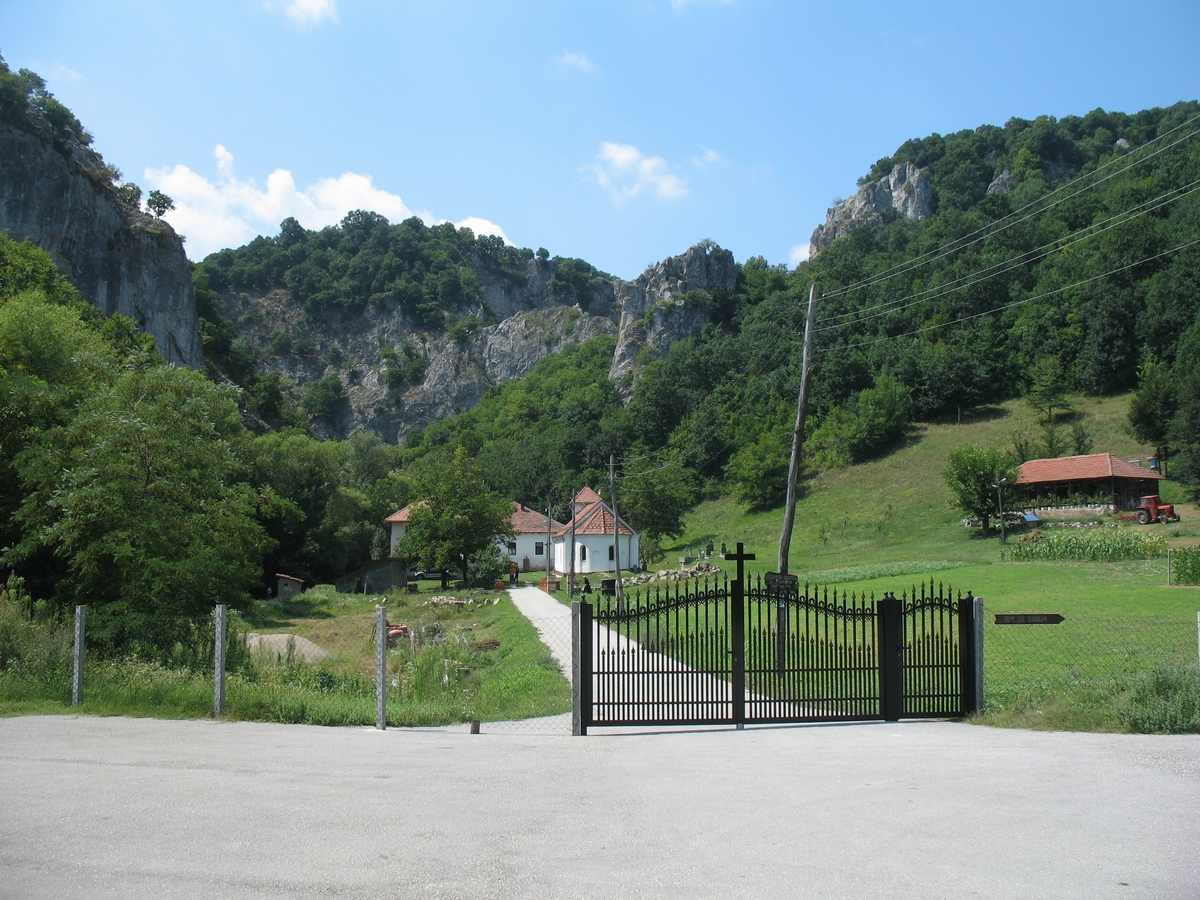

== See also ==
- List of Serbian Orthodox monasteries
