= Đake =

Đake Ђаке (Serbian)
- Village
- Location within Serbia
- Coordinates: 43°02′00″N 21°25′18″E
- Country: Serbia
- District: Toplica District
- Municipality: Kuršumlija

Population (2002)
  - Total: 83
- Time zone: UTC+1 (CET)
  - Summer (DST): UTC+2 (CEST)

Đake (Serbian Cyrillic: Ђаке) is a village in the municipality of Kuršumlija, Serbia. According to the 2002 census, the village had a population of 83 people.

== History ==
Đake was inhabited by Albanians before the Expulsion of the Albanians took place in 1877–1878. All Albanians left the Kuršumlija region by force of the Serbian army and fled to modern-day Kosovo, which was back then the Vilayet of Kosovo of the Ottoman Empire. These Albanians became known as Muxhahirs ("Muslim refugees" in Albanian) and were demographically Albanians of the Gheg dialect and Muslims.

The name of the village is considered to come from the Albanian word Gjak and appears there since at least the 15th century. Next to the village is Mali Gjake (The mountain of Gjake).

Some families in Kosovo kept their surname (Xhaka) as the village they were from.
