= Mikrovalto =

Mikrovalto Μικρόβαλτο
- Community
- Location within Greece
- Coordinates: 40°4.9′N 21°52.578′E
- Country: Greece
- Administrative region: West Macedonia
- Regional unit: Kozani
- Municipality: Servia
- Municipal unit: Kamvounia
- Elevation: 749 m (2,457 ft)

Population (2021)
  - Community: 338
- Time zone: UTC+2 (EET)
  - Summer (DST): UTC+3 (EEST)
- Postal code: 504 00
- Area code: +30-2464
- Vehicle registration: ΚΖ

Mikrovalto (Greek: Μιρόβαλτο) is a village and a community of the municipality of Servia. Before the 2011 local government reform it was part of the municipality of Kamvounia, of which it was a municipal district. The 2021 census recorded 338 inhabitants in the village.
