= Las Majadas =

- Municipality
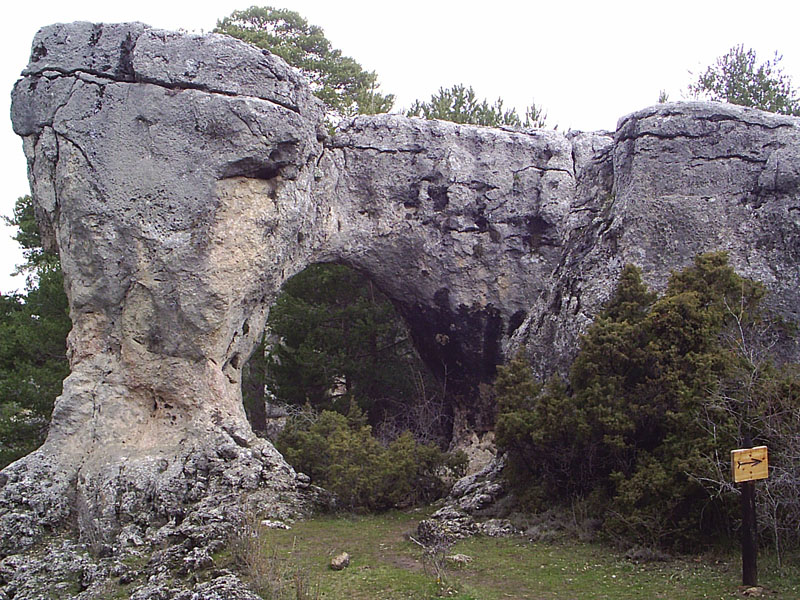
- Los Callejones de Las Majadas rock formations in the Serranía de Cuenca

- Location within Spain Location within Castilla-La Mancha
- Coordinates: 40°18′N 2°01′W
- Country: Spain
- Autonomous community: Castile-La Mancha
- Province: Cuenca

Population (2025-01-01)
  - Total: 214
- Time zone: UTC+1 (CET)
  - Summer (DST): UTC+2 (CEST)

Las Majadas is a municipality in Cuenca, Castile-La Mancha, Spain. It has a population of 365.
