= List of rock formations =

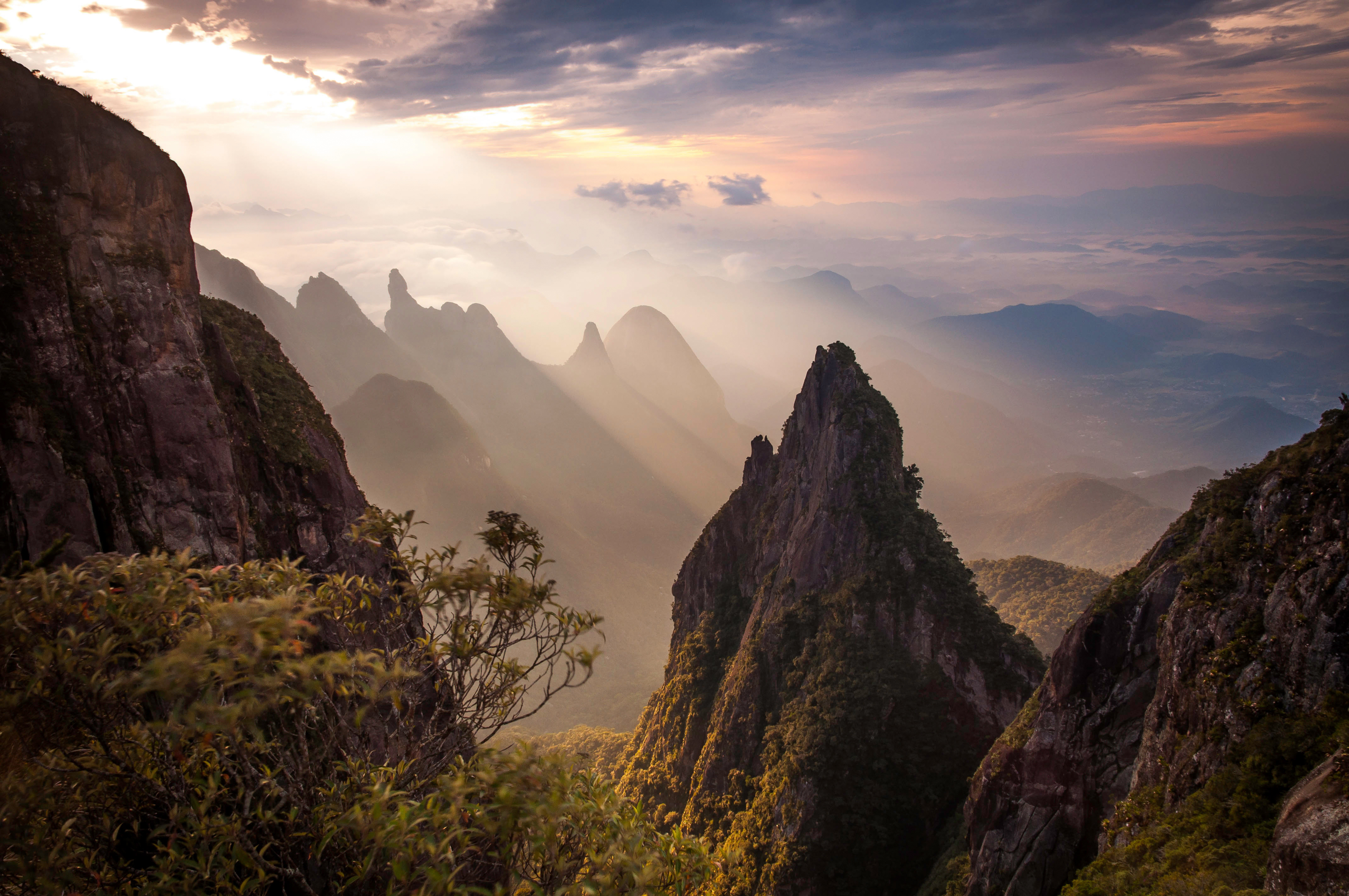
Rocks formations and the Dedo de Deus (God's Finger) peak in the background, Serra dos Órgãos National Park, Rio de Janeiro state, Brazil

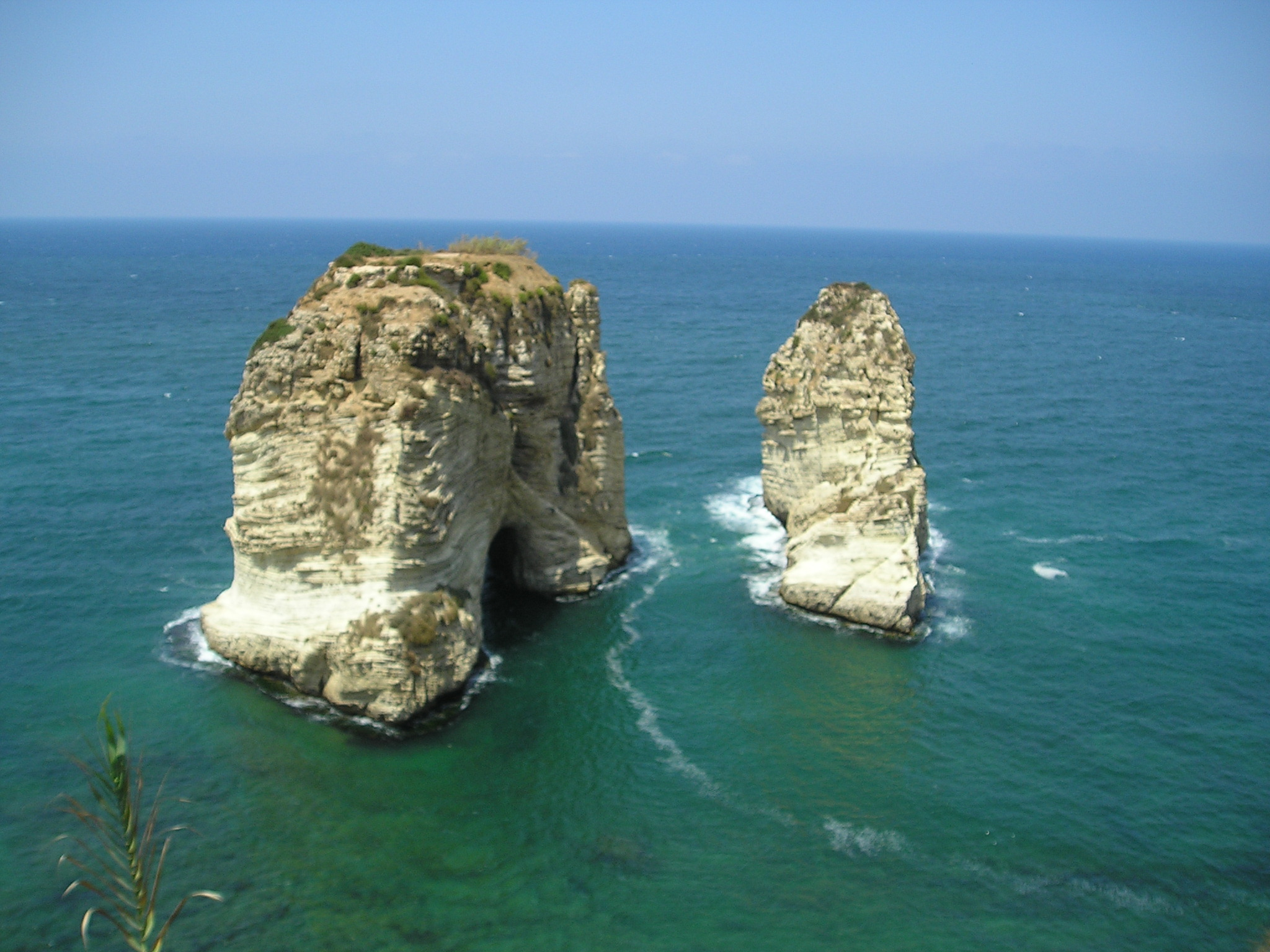
Raouché or Pigeons' Rock in Beirut, Lebanon

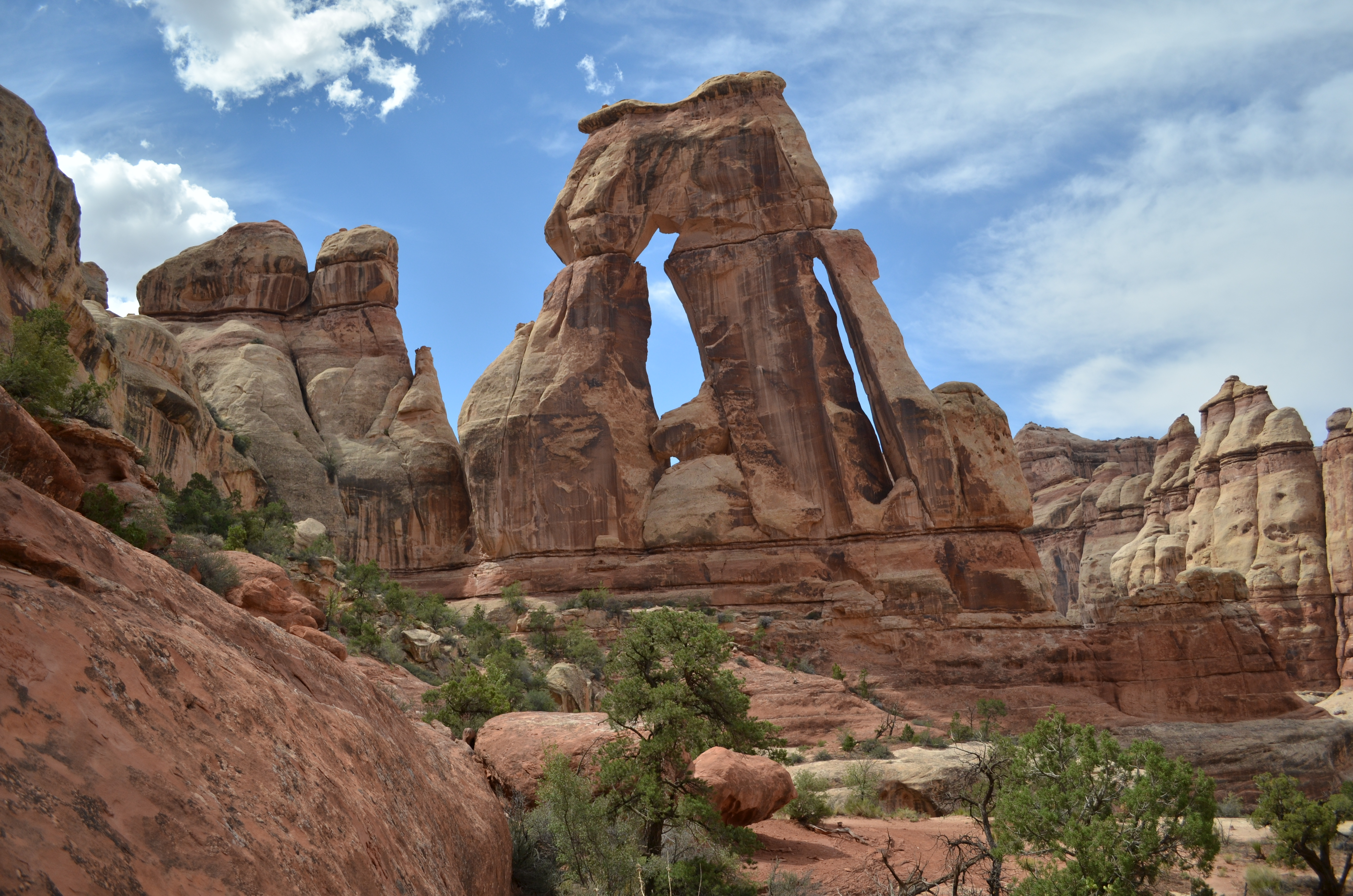
Druid Arch, Canyonlands National Park, Utah, US

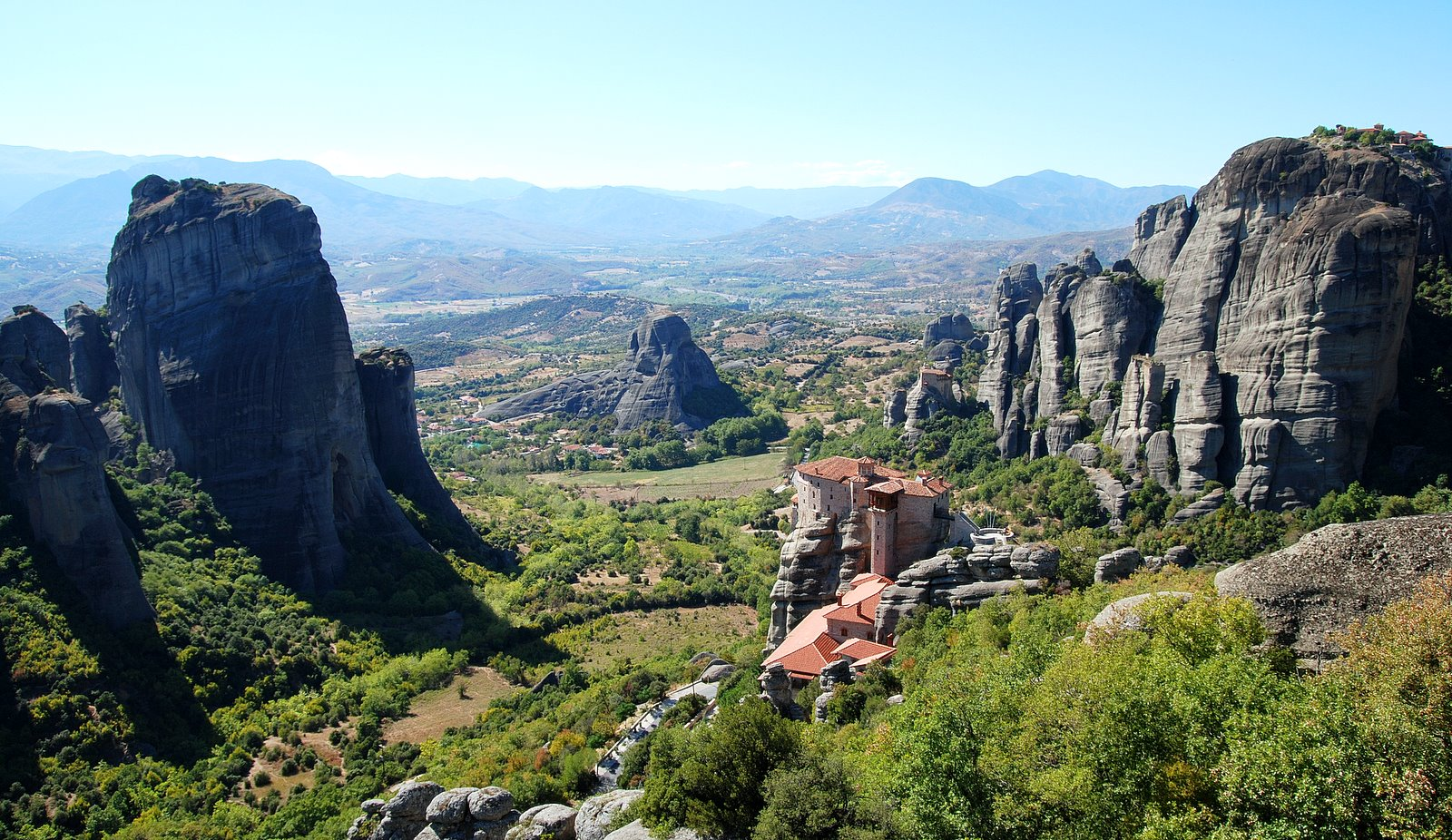
View of Meteora, Greece

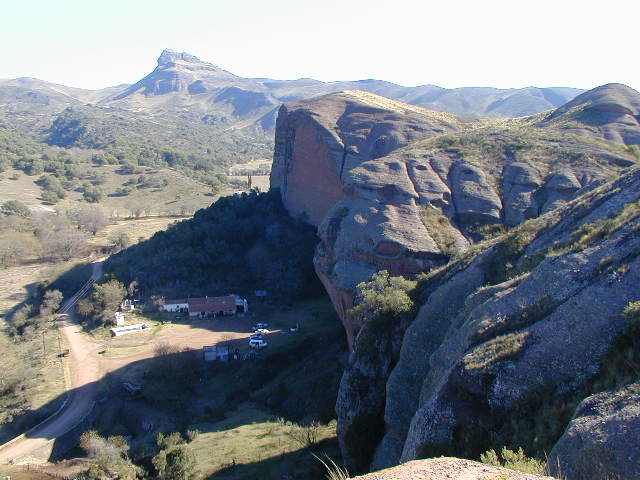
Rock formations in Ongamira Valley, Sierras de Córdoba, Argentina

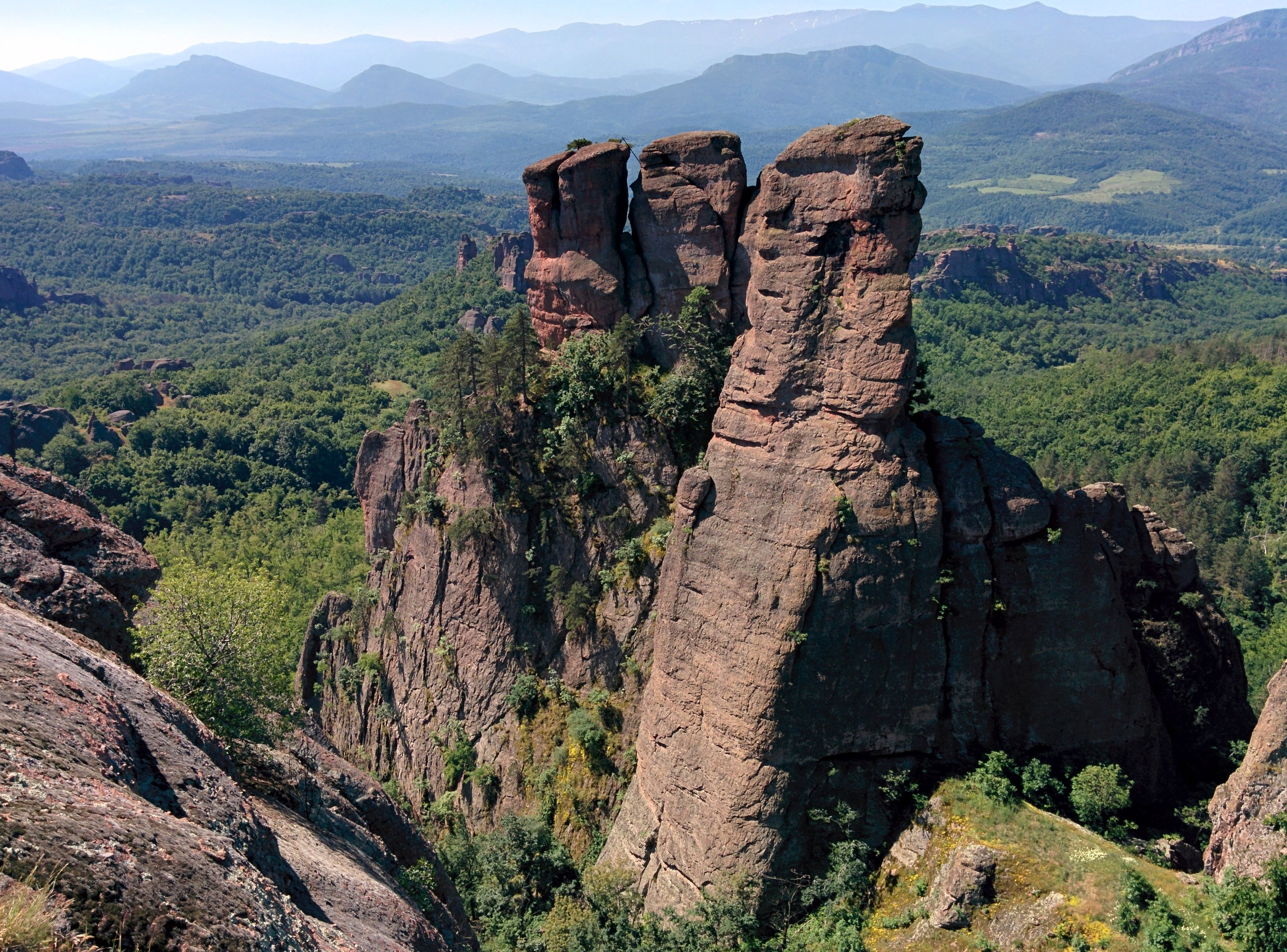
Belogradchik Rocks, Balkan Mountains, Bulgaria

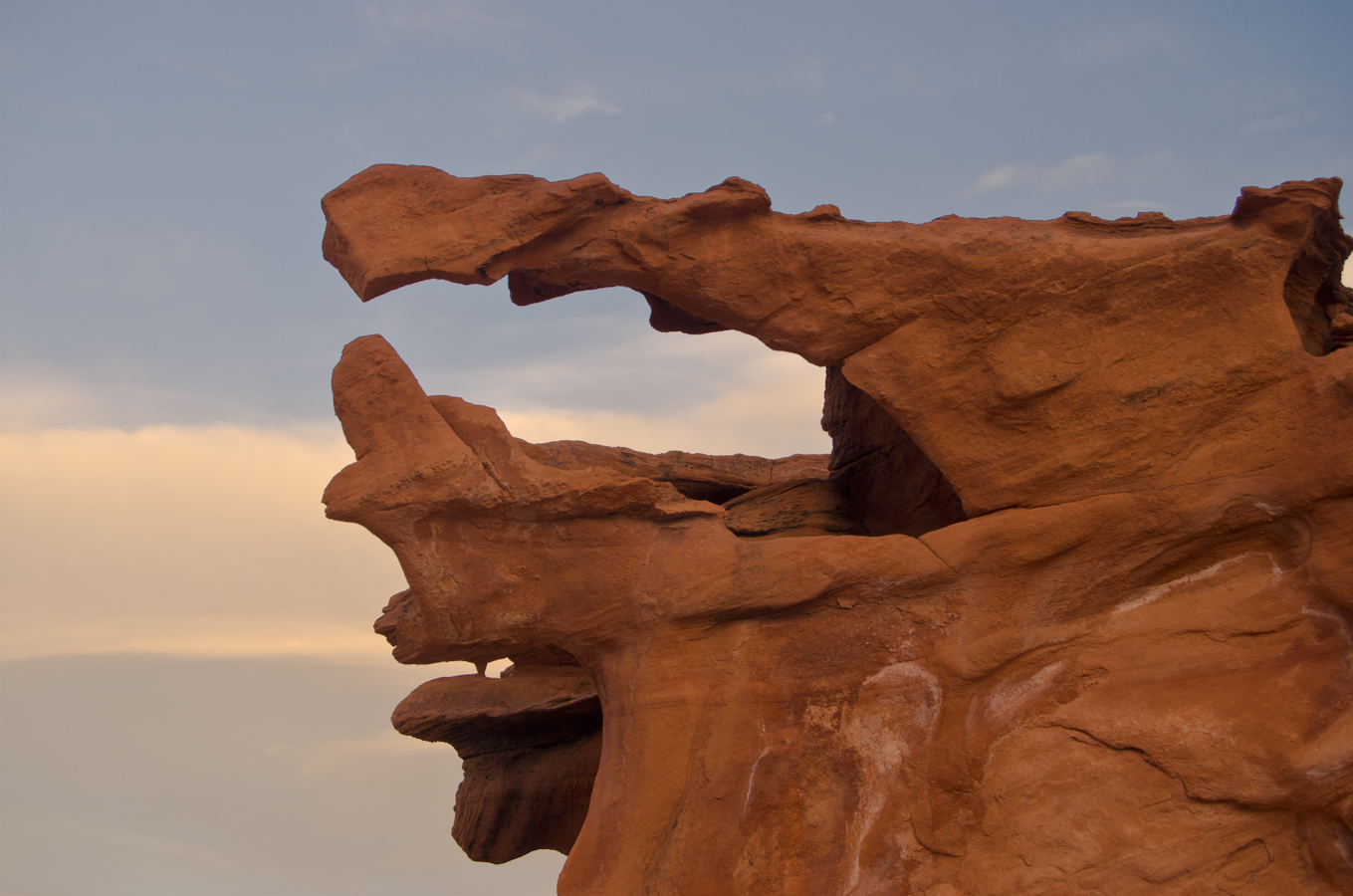
"Jaws", an erosional fin in Little Finland, Nevada, US

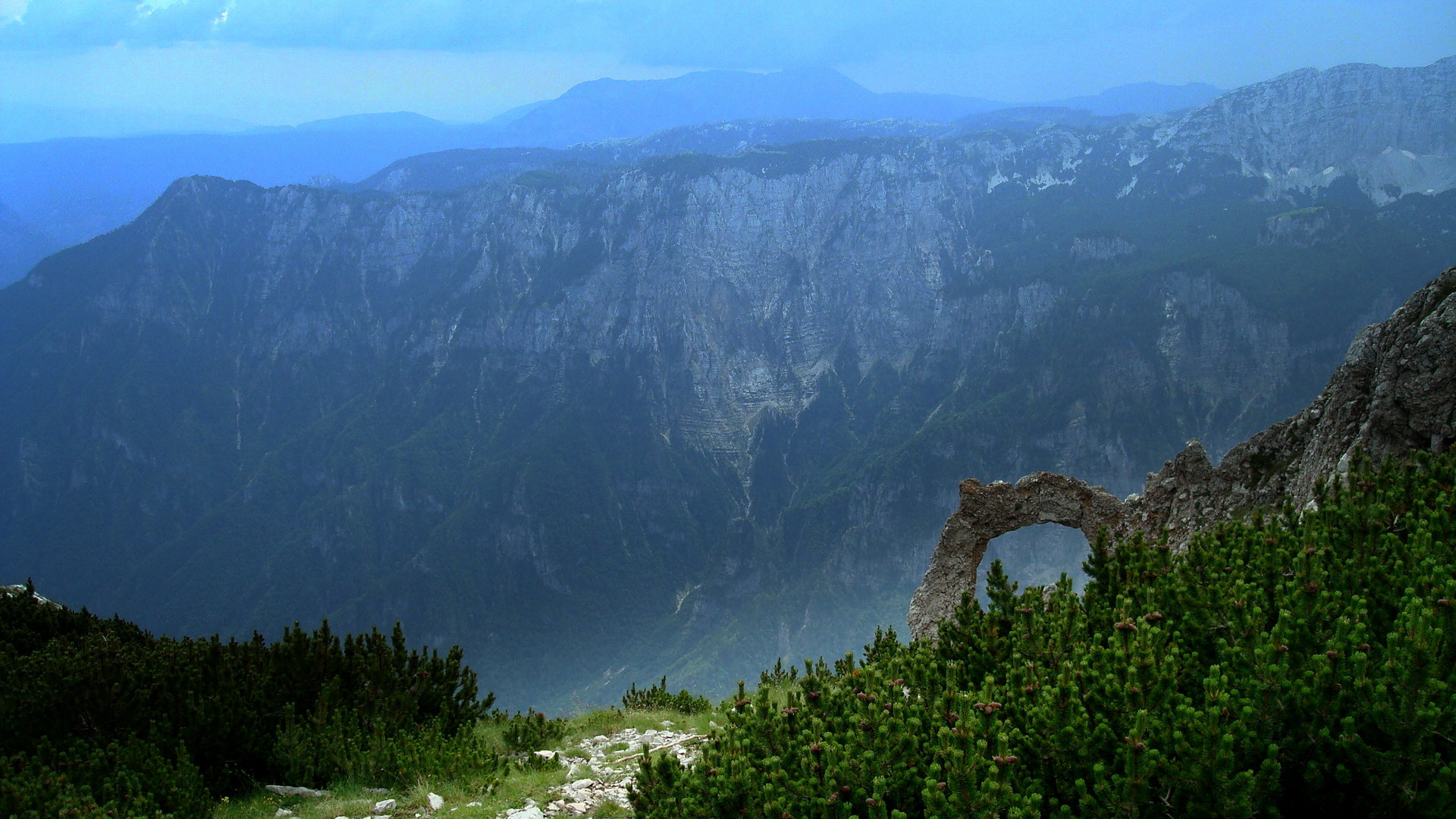
"Hajdučka vrata" on Čvrsnica, Herzegovina

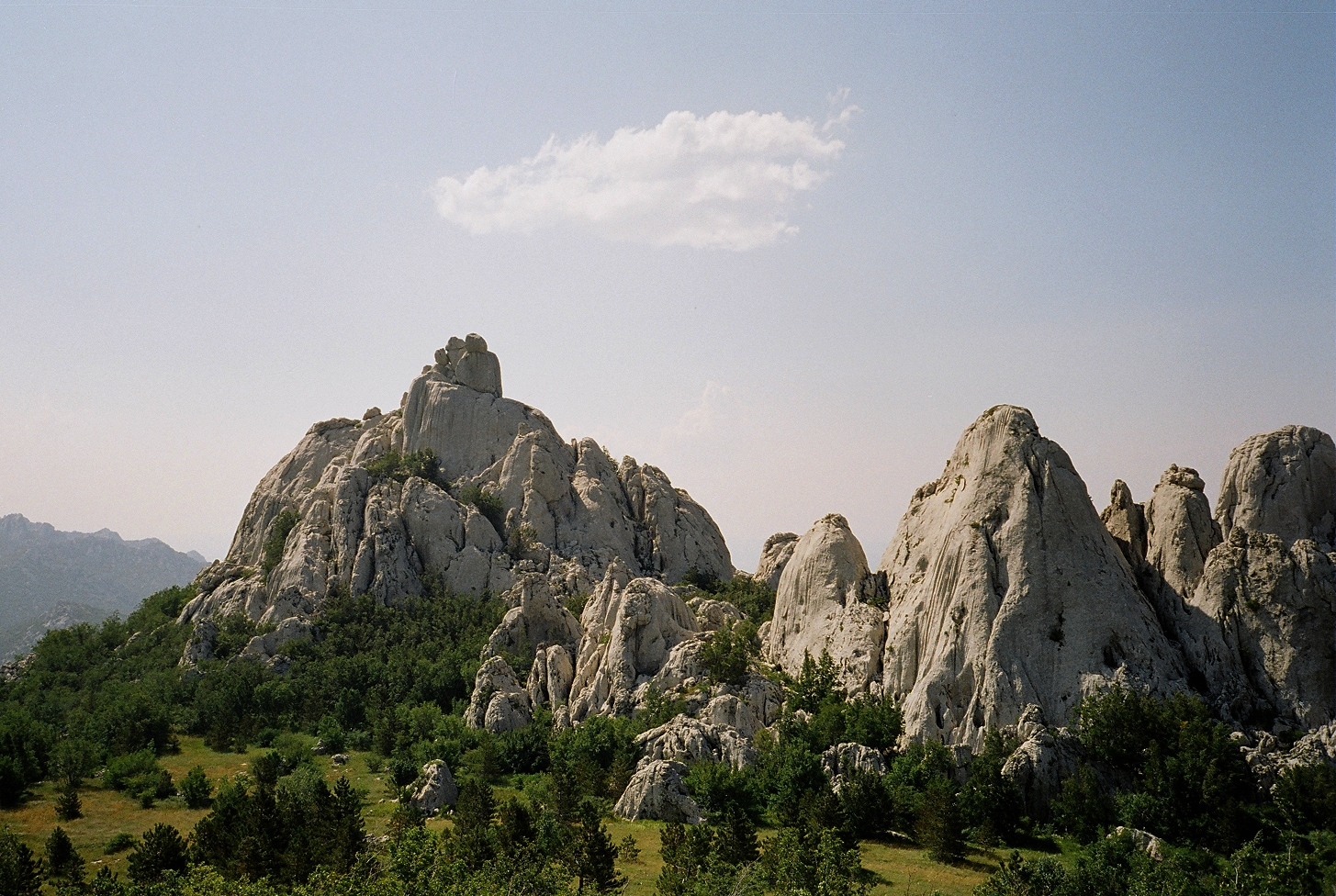
Paklenica, Croatia

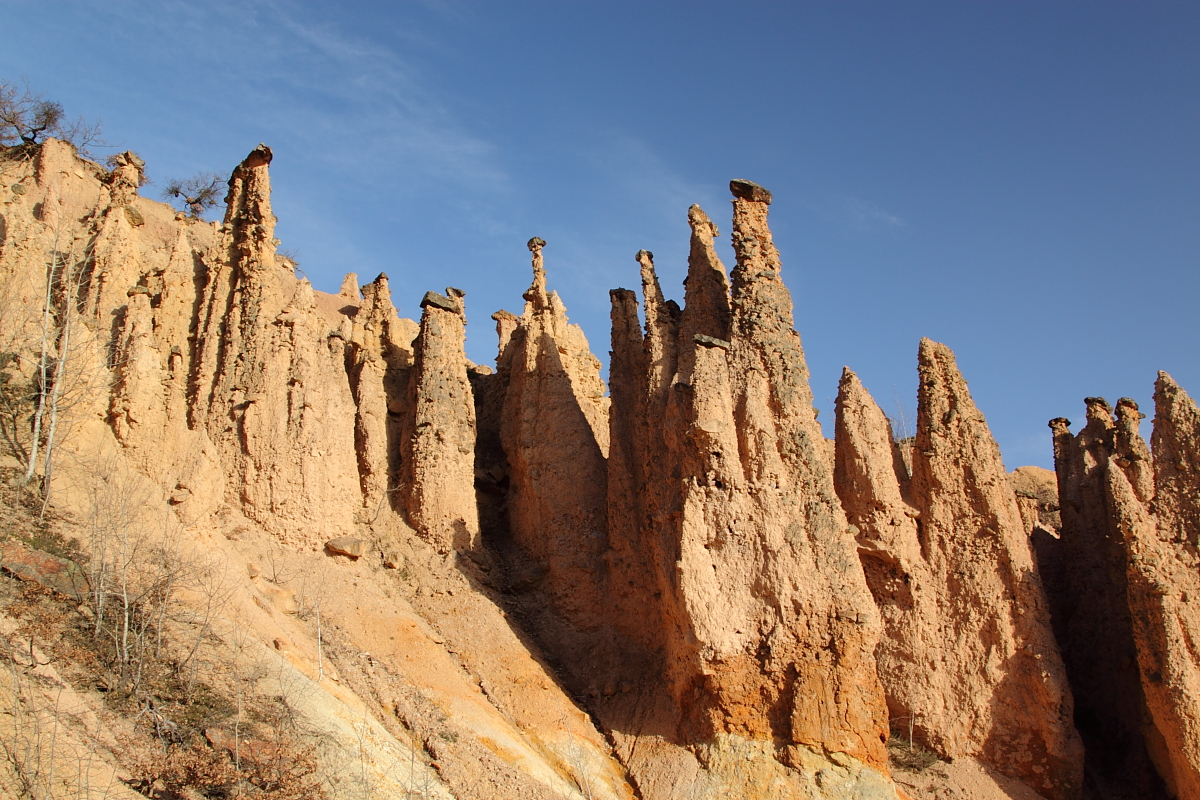
Devil's Town, Serbia

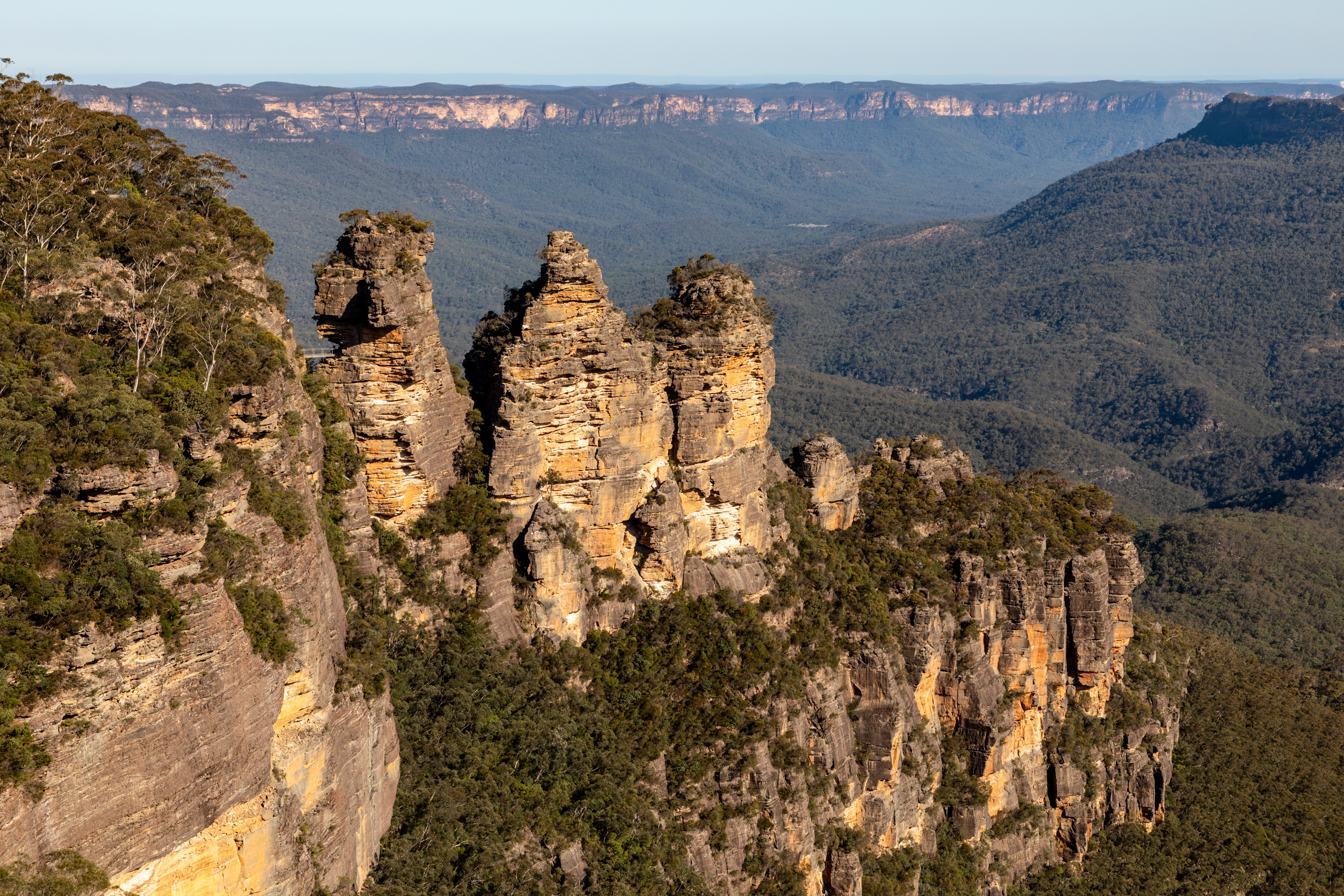
Three Sisters in Blue Mountains, Australia

A rock formation is an isolated, scenic, or spectacular surface rock outcrop. Rock formations are usually the result of weathering and erosion sculpting the existing rock. The term rock formation can also refer to the process of formation of rocks. It is not to be confused with the concept of a geological formation, which represents a unit of strata rather than a topographic feature like rock formations.

A rock structure can be created in any rock type or combination:

- Igneous rocks are created when molten rock cools and solidifies, with or without crystallisation. They may be either plutonic bodies or volcanic extrusive. Again, erosive forces sculpt their current forms.
- Metamorphic rocks are created by rocks that have been transformed into another kind of rock, usually by some combination of heat, pressure, and chemical alteration.
- Sedimentary rocks are created by a variety of processes but usually involving deposition, grain by grain, layer by layer, in water or, in the case of terrestrial sediments, on land through the action of wind or sometimes moving ice. Erosion later exposes them in their current form.

Geologists have created a number of terms to describe different rock structures in the landscape that can be formed by natural processes:

- Butte
- Cliff
- Cut bank
- Escarpment
- Gorge
- Inselberg, or monadnock
- Mesa
- Peak
- Promontory
- River cliff
- Sea cliff
- Stack
- Stone run
- Tor

Here is an incomplete list of rock formations by continent.

== Asia ==
=== Armenia ===
- Geghard
- Garni Gorge
- Goris
- Khndzoresk

=== China ===
- Yunmeng Mountain National Forest Park, Beijing
- Guilin, Guangxi Zhuang Autonomous Region
- Huangshan, Anhui Province
- Wulingyuan Scenic and Historic Interest Area, Zhangjiajie, Hunan

=== Hong Kong ===
- Amah Rock, New Territories
- Lion Rock, New Kowloon/New Territories

=== Jordan ===
- Petra, Amman
- Wadi Rum Desert

=== India ===
- Jabalpur Marble Rocks, Madhya Pradesh
- Rock Formations in Rayalseema Andhra Pradesh, Hampi Karnataka
- Yana

=== Israel ===
- Rosh Hanikra
- Timna Arch, Eilat
- Karnei Hattin

=== Lebanon ===
- Cape Lithoprosopon
- Raouché, Beirut

=== Mongolia ===
- Turtle Rock, Gorkhi-Terelj National Park, Töv Aimag/Nalaikh

=== Pakistan ===
- Rock formations at Hingol National Park

=== Thailand ===
- Lalu (ละลุ), rock formations caused by erosion at the eastern end of the Sankamphaeng Range in Sa Kaeo Province
- Phae Mueang Phi ("Ghost Canyon") near Phrae in the Phi Pan Nam Range
- Phu Phra Bat Buabok in Udon Thani Province

=== Turkey ===
- Paşabağı, Cappadocia
- Goreme National Park

=== Other countries ===
- Gobustan National Park, Azerbaijan
- Kyaiktiyo Pagoda, Mon State, Burma
- Aphrodite's Rock, Paphos, Cyprus
- Tanah Lot, Bali, Indonesia
- Jeti-Ögüz, Jeti-Ögüz district, Kyrgyzstan
- Tanjong Bunga, Penang, Malaysia
- Al Naslaa rock formation, Saudi Arabia
- Long Ya Men, Singapore
- Seorak-san National Park, Sokcho, South Korea
- Yehliu, Taiwan
- Halong Bay, Vietnam
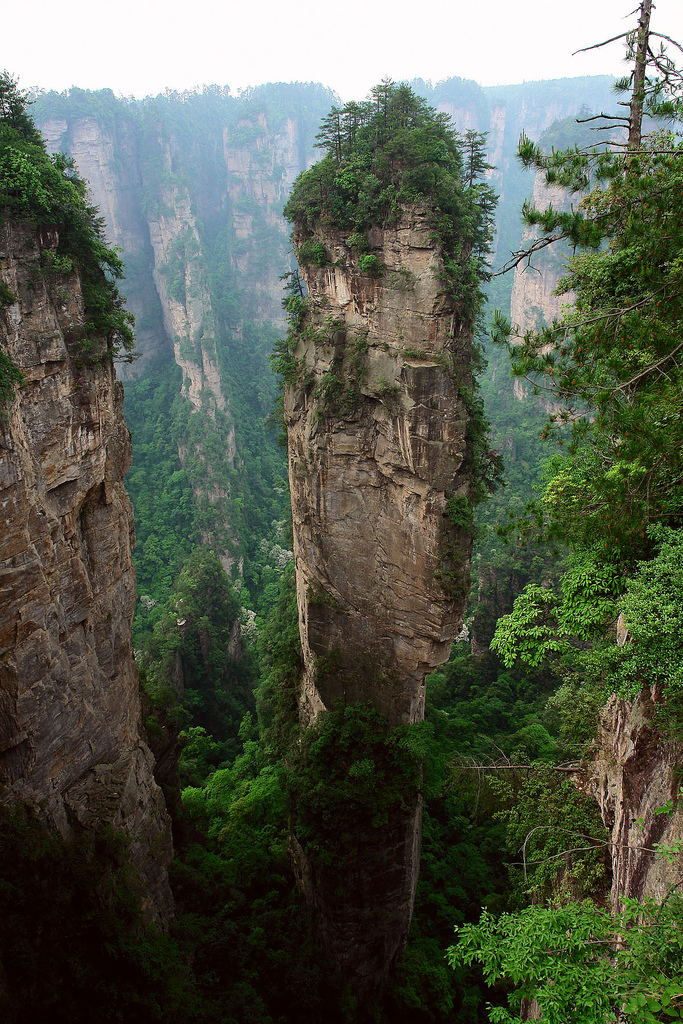
Avatar Mountains, Zhangjiajie National Forest Park in Wulingyuan

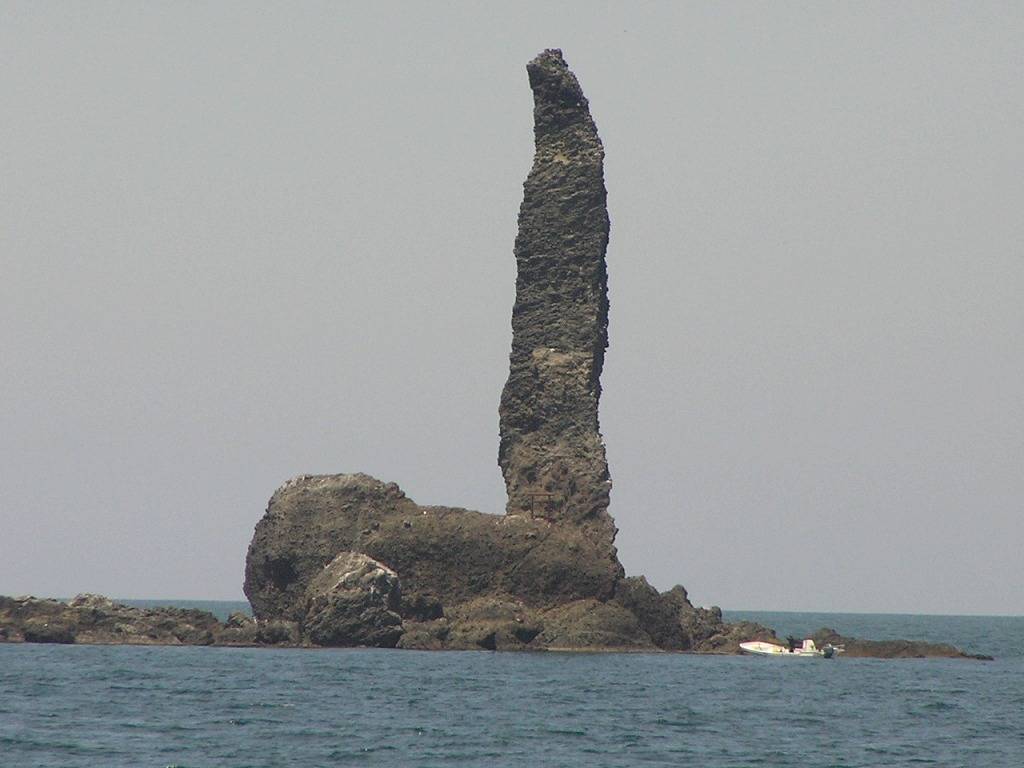
Candle Rock (Yoichi, Hokkaidō, Japan)

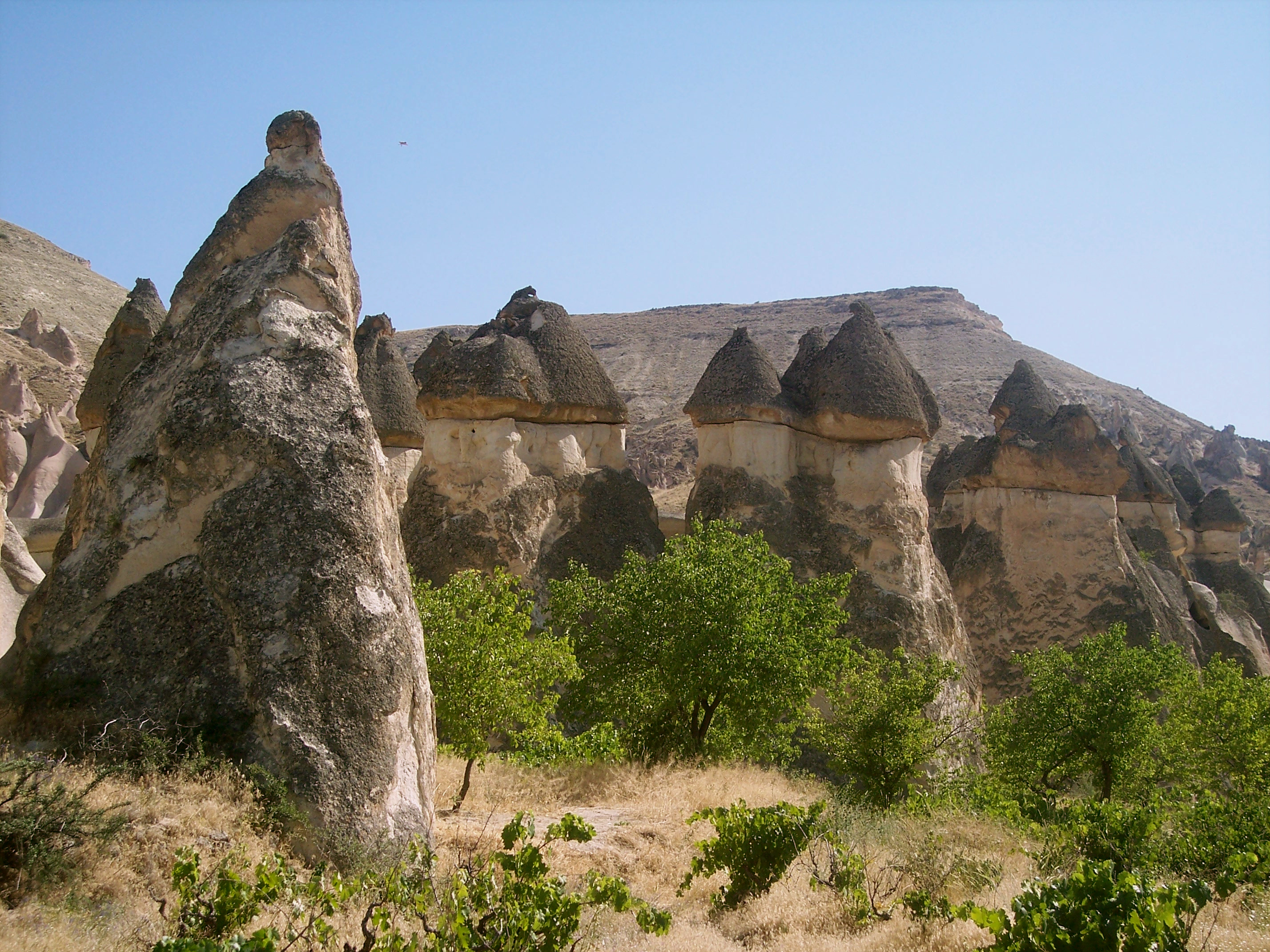
Paşabağı, Cappadocia Turkey

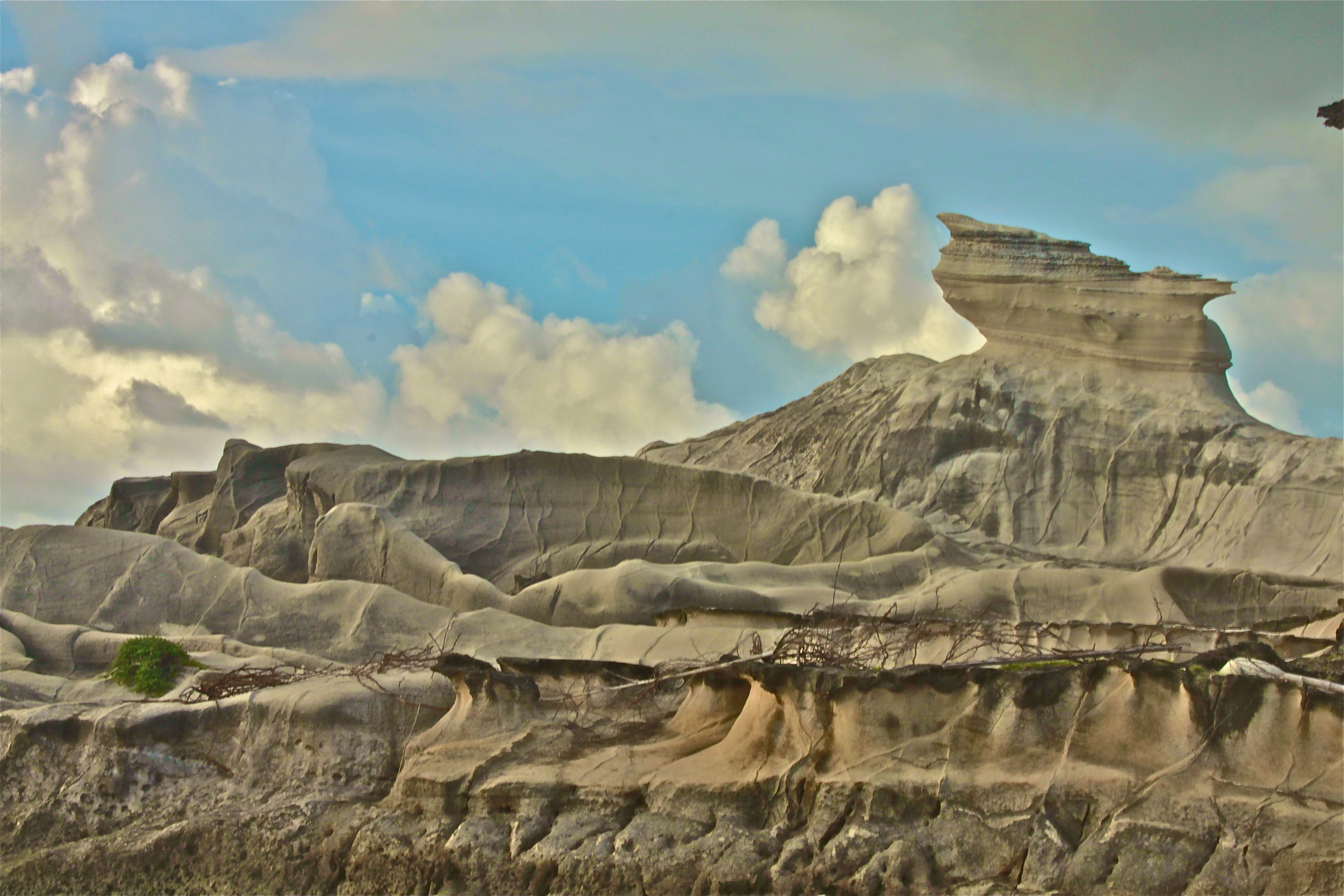
Kapurpurawan Rock Formation in Burgos, Ilocos Norte, Philippines

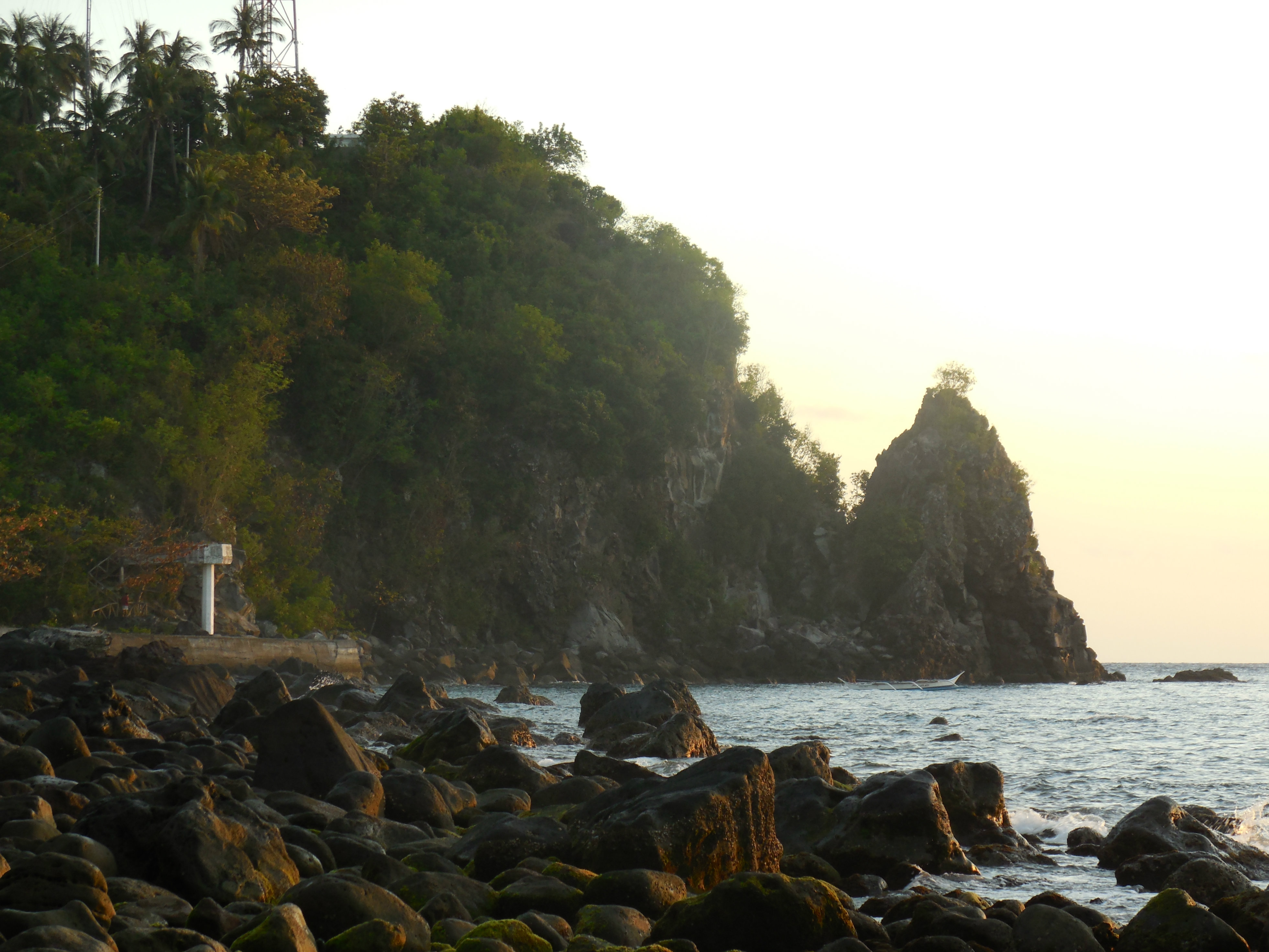
Punta Matagar rock formation in Banton, Romblon, Philippines

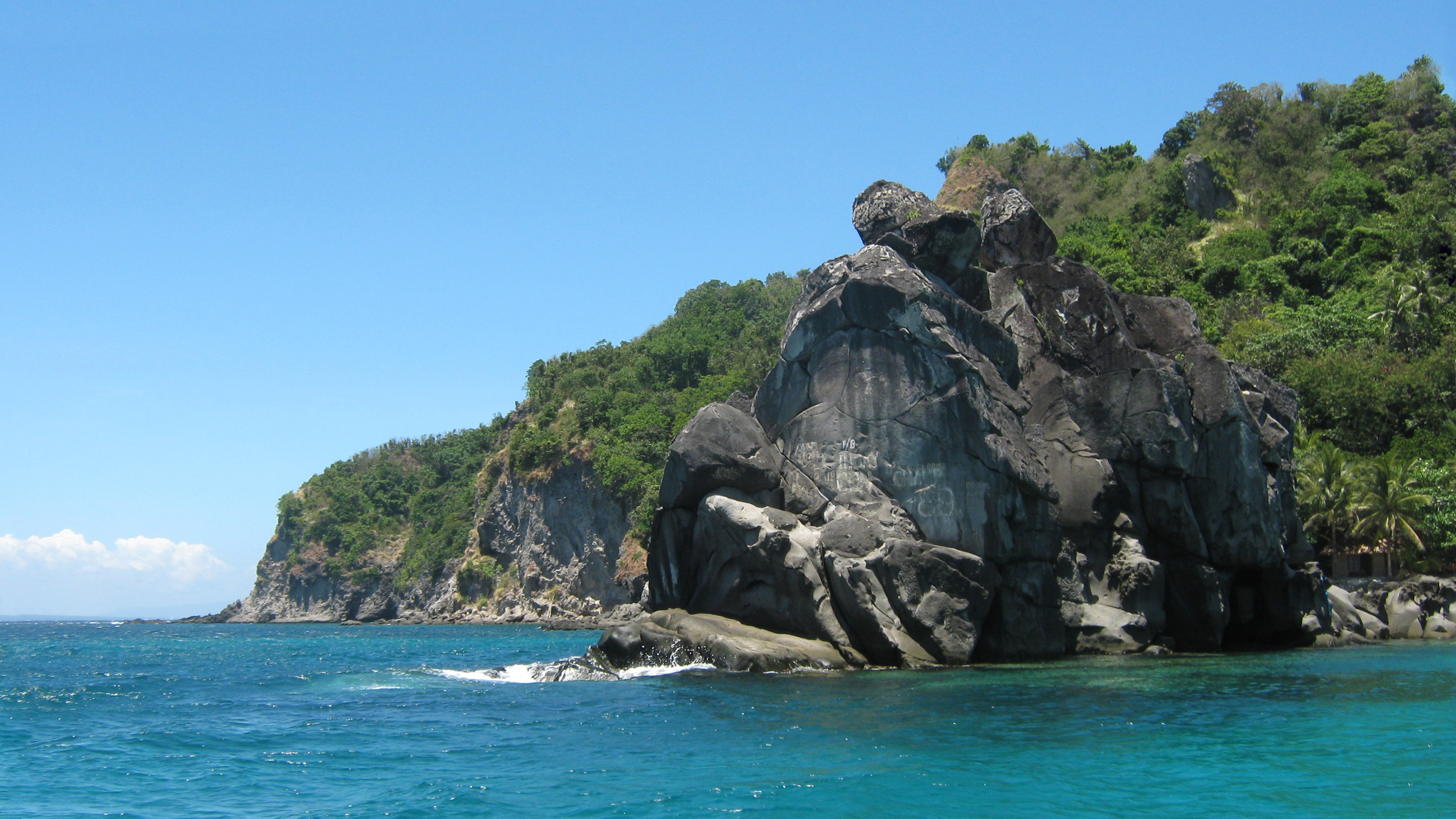
A rock formation at Apo Island in Dauin, Negros Oriental, Philippines

== Africa ==
=== Kenya ===
- Tsavo Rocks

=== Libya ===
- Jebel Akhdar

=== Madagascar ===
- Andringitra Massif
- Tsingy d'Ankarana
- Tsingy de Bemaraha
- Tsingy de Namoroka
- Tsingy Rouge

=== Mauritania ===
- Ben Amera

=== Namibia ===
- Bogenfels

=== Nigeria ===
- Olumo Rock, Abeokuta
- Riyom Rock, Jos
- Zuma Rock, Abuja

=== South Africa ===
- Cedarberg Wilderness Area, Western Cape
- Kagga Kamma, Ceres, Western Cape
- Three Sisters (Northern Cape)
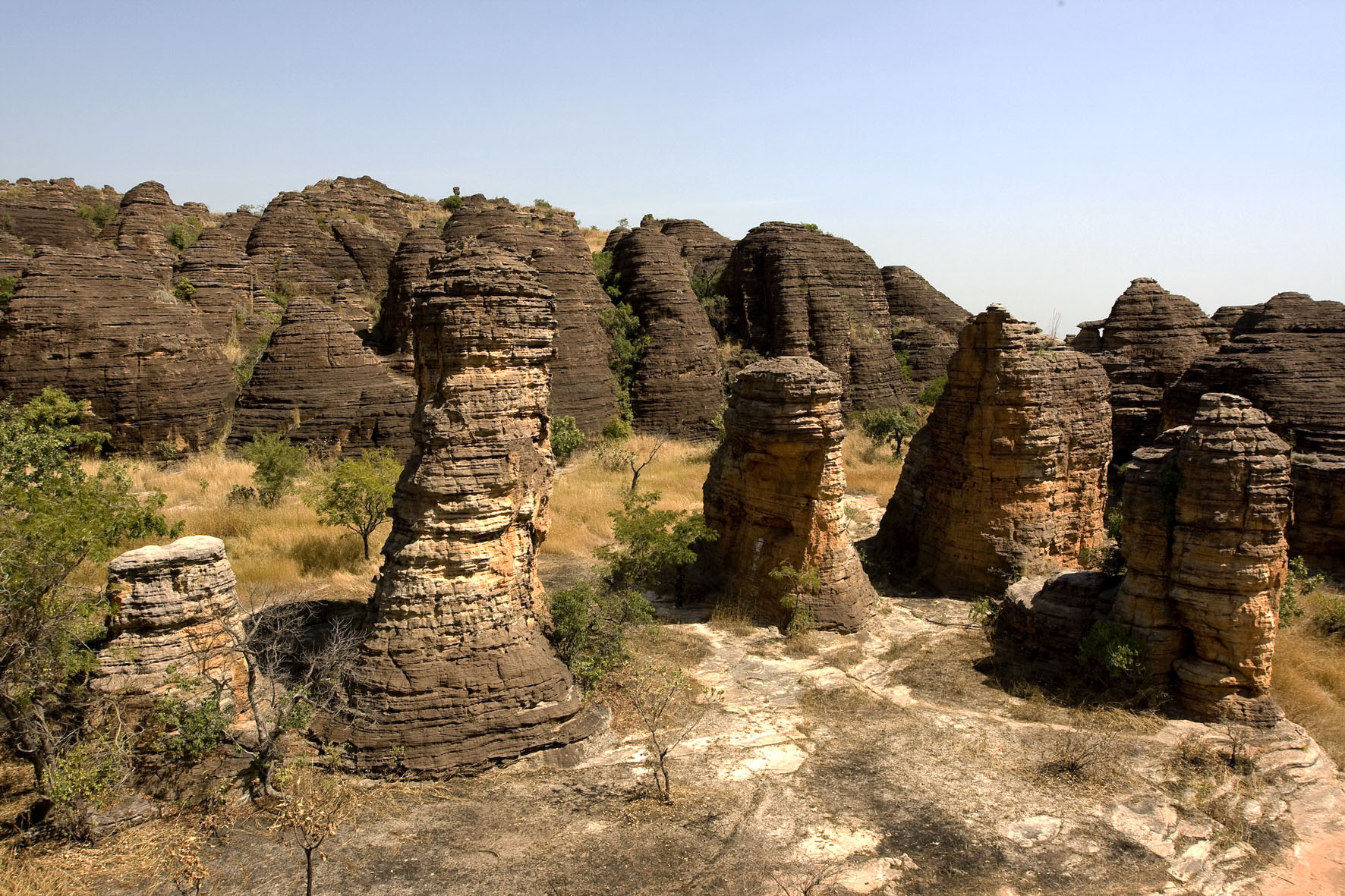
Domes de Fabedougou, Burkina Faso

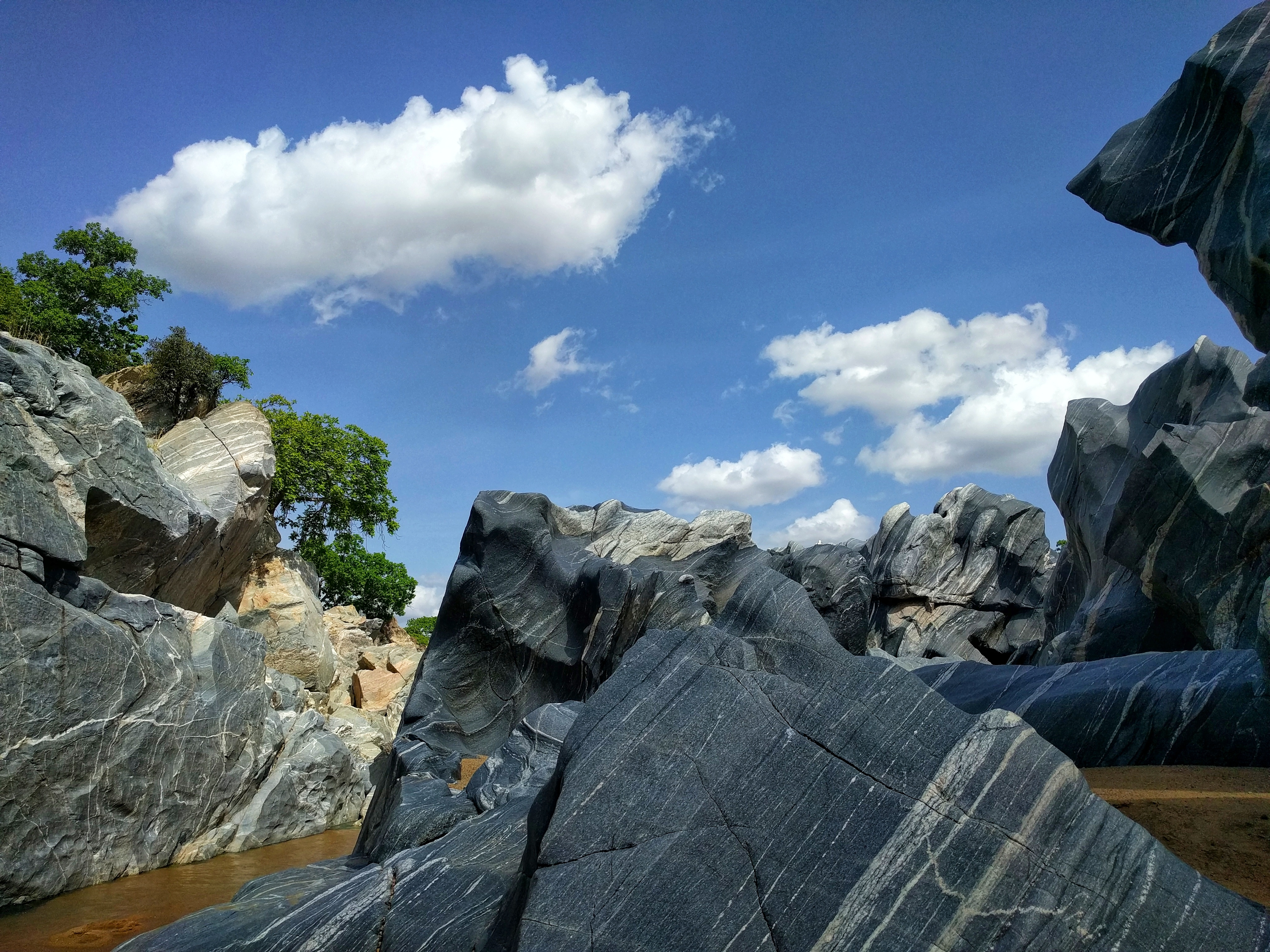
Kola Gorge rock structures, Cameroon

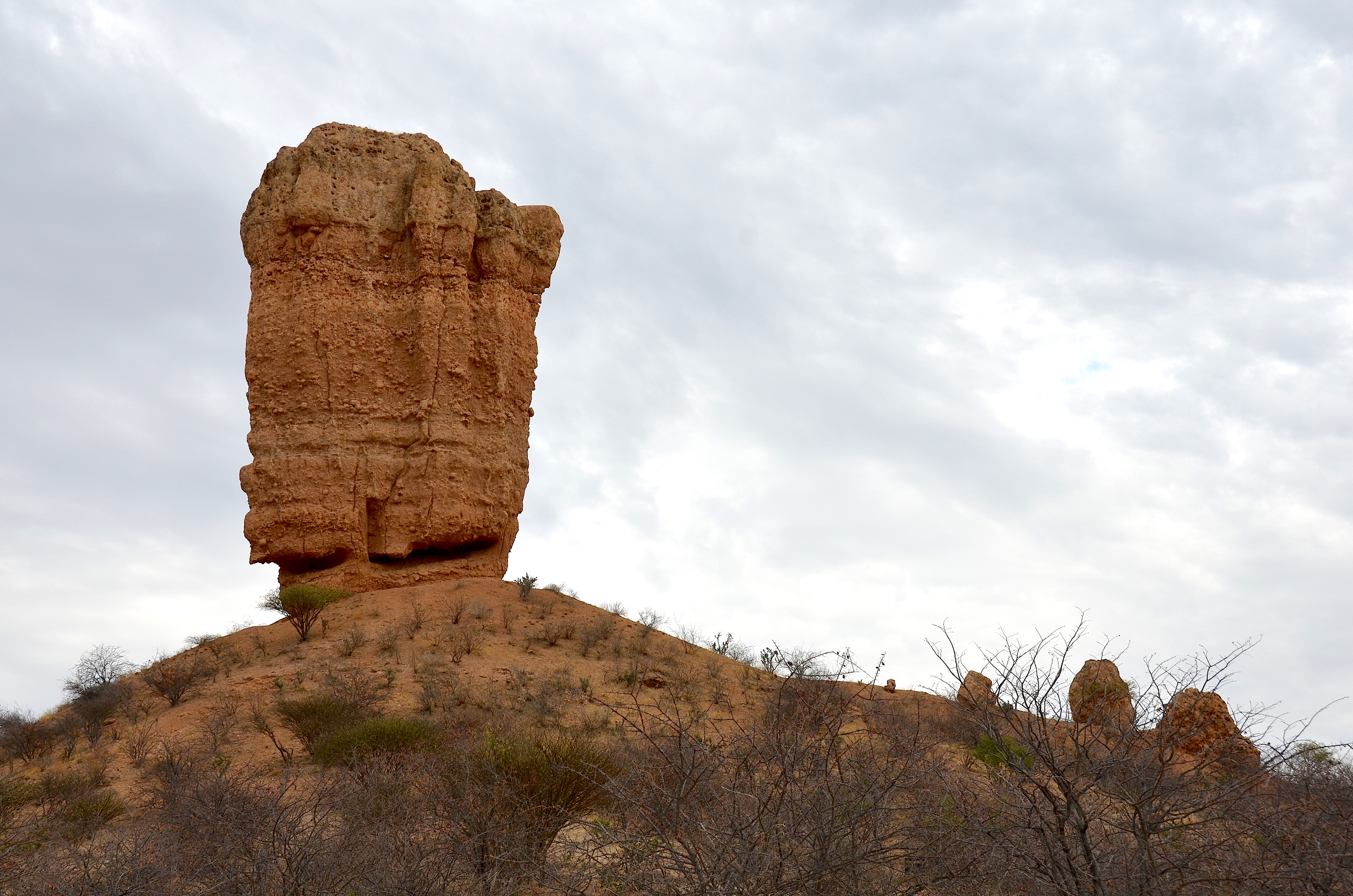
Vingerklip at Ugab Valley in Namibia

== North America ==
=== Canada ===
- Devil's Chair, Lake Superior Provincial Park, Ontario
- Flowerpot Island, Georgian Bay, Ontario
- Sleeping Giant, Ontario
- Grand Manan Island, New Brunswick
- Hopewell Rocks, New Brunswick
- Gabriola Island, British Columbia
- Brady's Beach, Bamfield, British Columbia
- Chimney Rock, Marble Canyon, British Columbia
- Heron Rocks, Hornby Island, British Columbia
- Siwash Rock, Stanley Park, Vancouver, British Columbia
- Percé Rock, Gaspé, Quebec
- Tete d'Indien, Perce, Gaspé, Quebec
- Balancing Rock, Long Island, Nova Scotia
- Peggy's Cove, Nova Scotia
- Banff National Park, Alberta
- Big Rock, Okotoks, Alberta
- Drumheller, Alberta
- Walsh, Alberta, see Medicine Hat, Alberta
- Main Topsail Hill, near Gaff Topsails, Newfoundland and Labrador
- Arches, St. Anthony, Newfoundland and Labrador
- Elephant Rock, Prince Edward Island
- Giant's Chair, Howard's Cove, Prince Edward Island
- Victoria Rock, Yukon

=== Caribbean ===
- Ayo Rock Formations, Aruba
- Devil's Trail, Virgin Gorda, British Virgin Islands
- The Baths, Virgin Gorda, British Virgin Islands
- Coki Beach, St. Thomas, United States Virgin Islands
- Pointe des Châteaux, Grande Terre, Guadeloupe
- Diamond Rock (Rocher du Diamant), Martinique

=== Mexico ===
- Sierra de Organos National Park, Sombrerete, Zacatecas
- Piedras Encimadas Valley, Zacatlán, Puebla
- Peña de Bernal, Bernal, Querétaro
- Copper Canyon, Chihuahua
- Los Arcos Rocks, Cabo San Lucas, Baja California Sur
- Hierve el Agua, San Lorenzo Albarradas

=== Central America ===
- Bosque del Cabo, Osa Peninsula, Costa Rica
- Los Ladrillos, Boquete, Panama

== South America ==
=== Argentina ===
- Quebrada de Humahuaca, Humahuaca
- Ongamira Valley, Córdoba
- Ischigualasto, San Juan Province
- Monte Fitz Roy, El Chalten

=== Bolivia ===
- Dali's Desert, Potosi
- Valle de Las Rocas, Uyuni
- Canon de Duene

=== Brazil ===
- Pão de Açúcar (Sugarloaf Mountain), Rio de Janeiro
- Ponta Grossa, Paraná
- Pedra do Jacaré (Alligator Stone), São Paulo
- Dedo de Deus (God's Finger Rock), Serra dos Órgãos, Rio de Janeiro
- Pedra do Cão Sentado, Nova Friburgo, Rio de Janeiro
- Pedra da Galinha Choca, Quixadá, Ceará

=== Chile ===
- Valle de la Luna, Antofagasta
- Playa de la Calabocillos, Constitucion
- Silla del Diablo

=== Colombia ===
- El Peñón de Guatapé (La Piedra de Peñol), Antioquia
- Laguna de La Plaza, Sierra Nevada del Cocuy

=== Ecuador ===
- Cerro de Arcos, Loja
- Pinnacle Rock, Bartolome Island, Galápagos Islands

=== Falkland Islands ===
- Princes Street Stone Run

=== Paraguay ===
- Amambay

=== Peru ===
- Colca Canyon, Arequipa

=== Uruguay ===
- Sierra de Mahoma, San José
- Cerro Arequita, Lavalleja

=== Venezuela ===
- Tepui, Roraima, Canaima National Park
- Piedras de San Martin, La Vela de Coro, Estado Falcón

== Europe ==
=== Bosnia and Herzegovina ===
- Hajdučka vrata, Čvrsnica mountain

=== Bulgaria ===
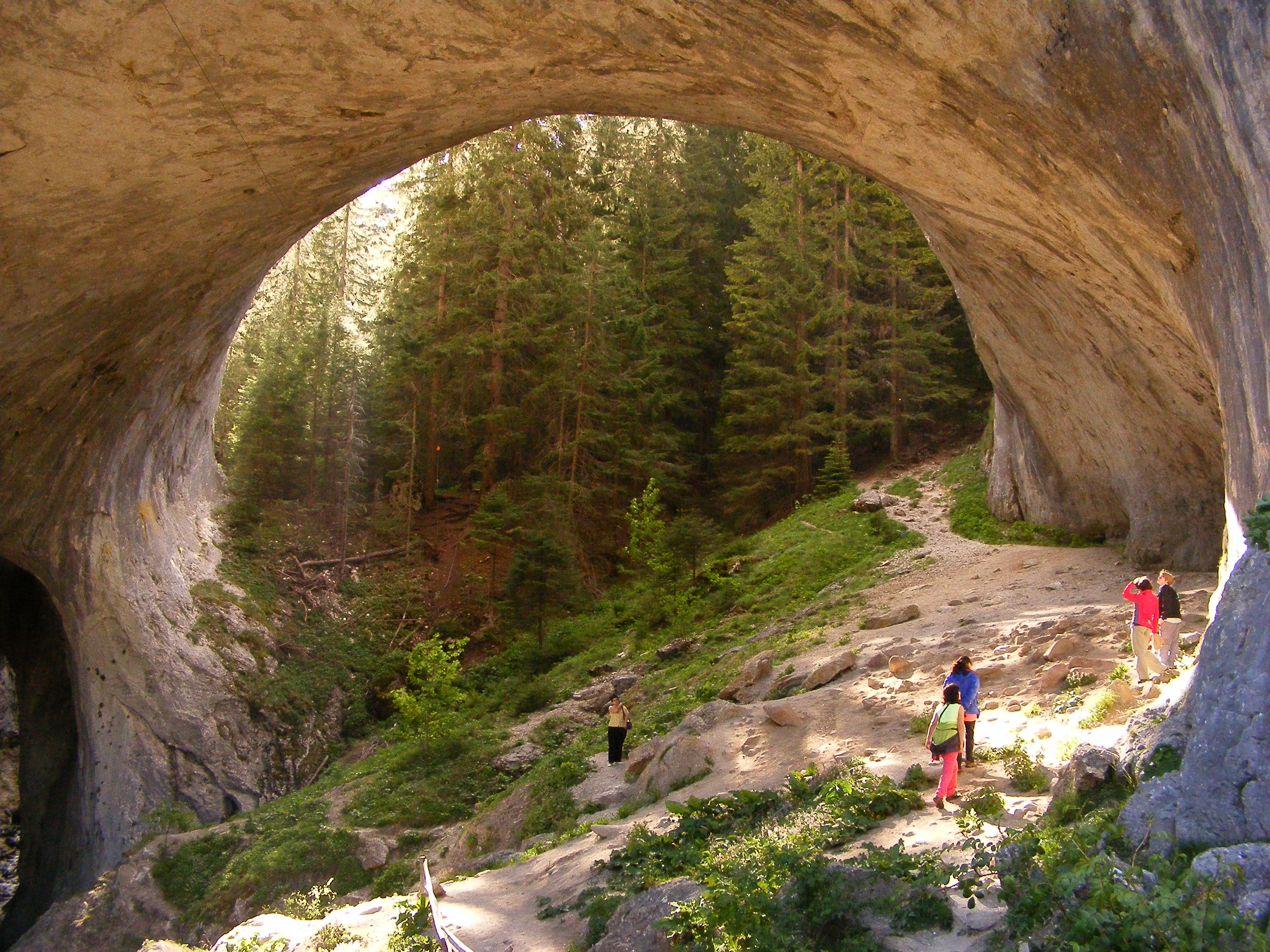
A view of the Wonderful Bridges, Bulgaria

- Basarbovo Monastery, Rousse
- Belogradchik Rocks
- Iskar Gorge, Sofia
- Melnik Earth Pyramids, Melnik
- Sozopol
- Wonderful Bridges
- Golden Bridges ('Zlatnite Mostove'), Vitosha
- Golyamata Gramada ('Big Pile'), Vitosha
- Pobiti Kamani

=== Croatia ===
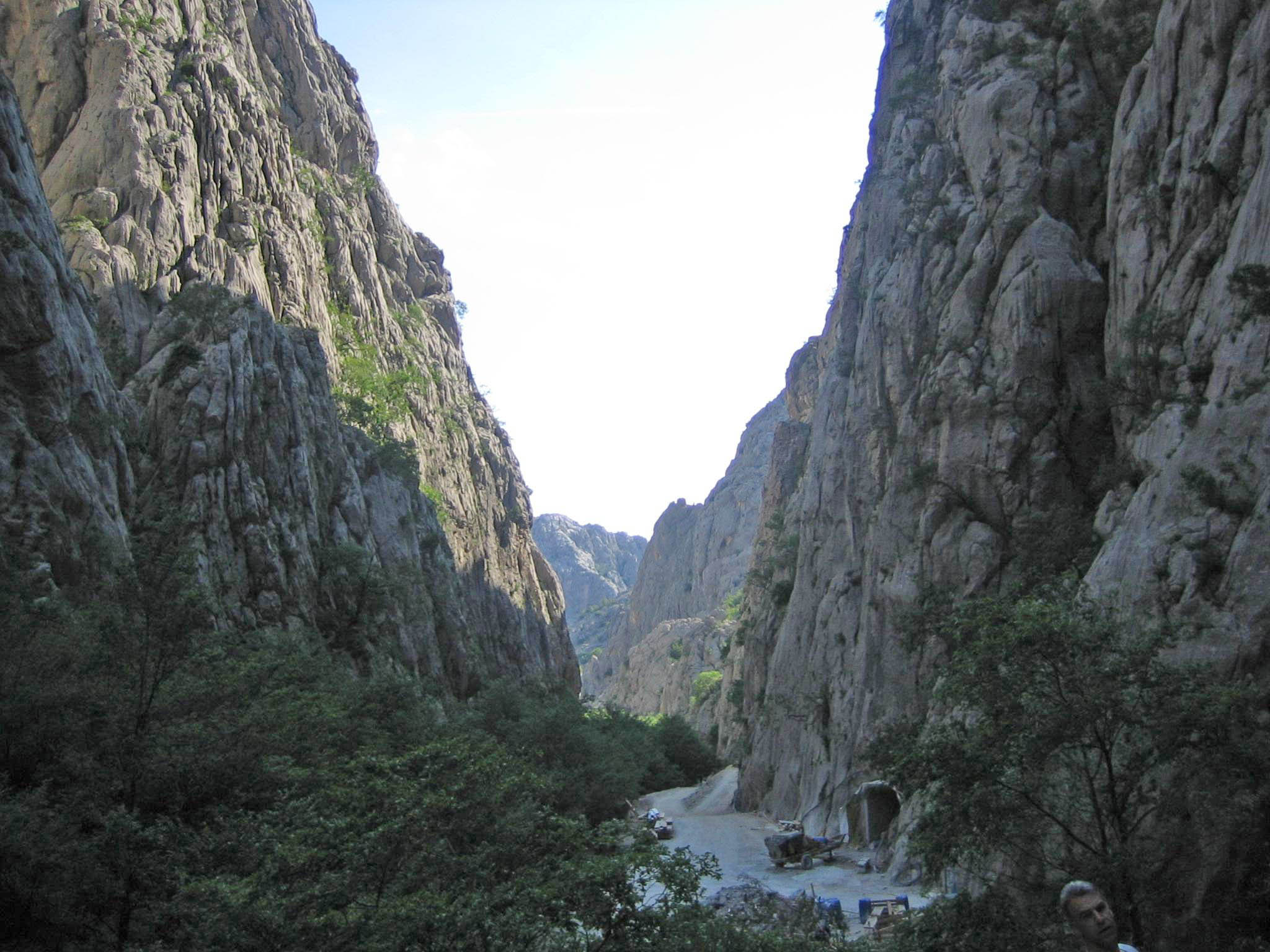
Paklenica, Croatia

- Paklenica
- Bijele stijene (White Rocks) and Samarske stijene (Samar Rocks), Velika Kapela mountain

=== Czech Republic ===
- Teplice nad Metují
- Medvědí Stezka (Bear's path), Šumava mountains, Klatovy
- Vraní skála, Brdy
- Suché skály, Turnov
- Hruboskalsko

=== Denmark ===
- Bornholm
- Fur Formation
- Møns Klint, Møn
- Gedser Odde, Gedser
- Stevns Klint, Eastern Zealand
- Cliffs of Sangstrup, Djursland

=== Estonia ===
- Vormsi island

=== Finland ===
- Närpes
- Naantali

=== France ===
- Roussillon, Vaucluse
- Lesconil, Brittany
- Les Calanche, Corsica
- Rocher des Doms, Avignon
- Étretat, Normandy
- Cassis, near Marseille, Provence
- Demoiselles Coiffées de Pontis, Alpes-de-Haute-Provence

=== Georgia ===
- Katskhi Pillar

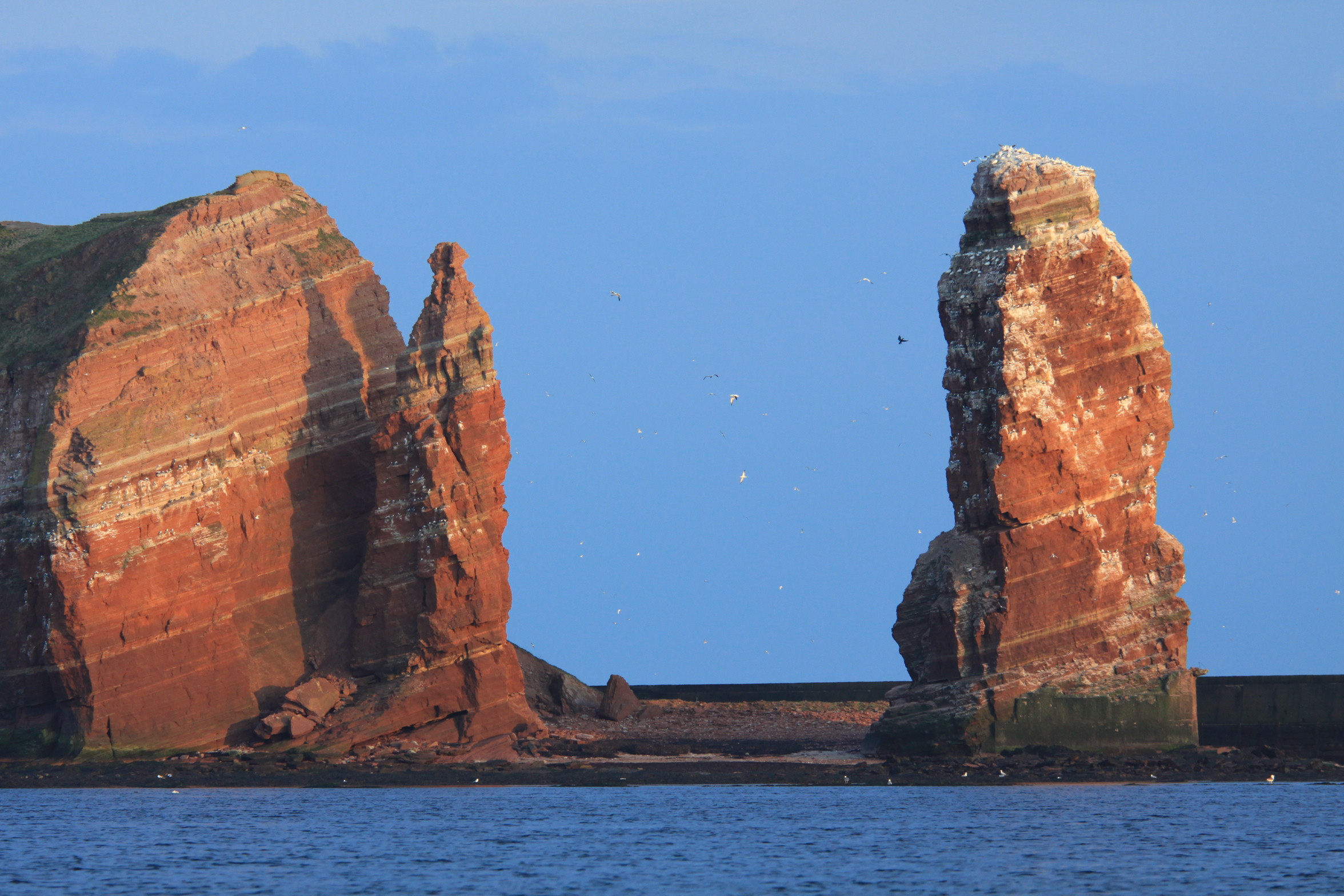
Lange Anna

=== Germany ===
- List of rock formations in the Harz
- Battert Rocks, Baden-Baden, Black Forest
- Externsteine
- Falkenfelsen
- Lange Anna, Heligoland
- Rotenfels, Nahe, Bad Münster am Stein-Ebernburg, Rhineland-Palatinate
- Teufelsturm, Elbe Sandstone Mountains
- Wasgau

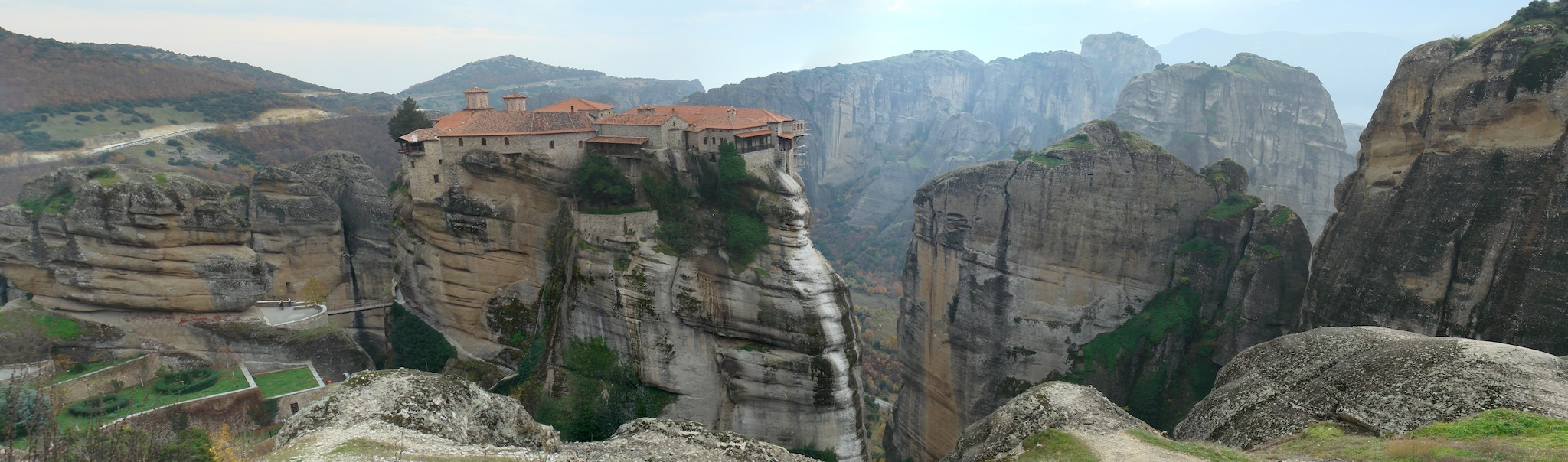
Meteora with Greek Orthodox monasteries

=== Greece ===
- Meteora
- Monemvasia
- Samaria Gorge, Crete
- Sarti, Sithonia

=== Gibraltar ===
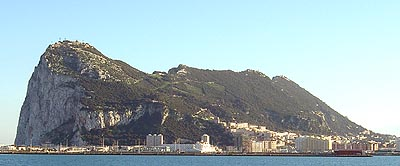
The iconic Rock of Gibraltar

- Rock of Gibraltar

=== Bailiwick of Guernsey ===
- Les Autelets, Sark, Channel Islands
- Telegraph Bay, Alderney, Channel Islands

=== Iceland ===
- Vestmannaeyjar
- Jokulsa Canyon National Park, Mývatn
- Dimmuborgir, Mývatn
- Dyrhólaey
- Eystrahorn, Hvalnes

=== Ireland ===
- Beara Peninsula, Bantry, County Cork
- Skellig Rocks, Iveragh Peninsula, County Kerry
- Gap of Dunloe, Killarney, County Kerry
- Tory Island, County Donegal
- Achill Island, County Mayo
- Answering Stone, County Waterford

=== Italy ===
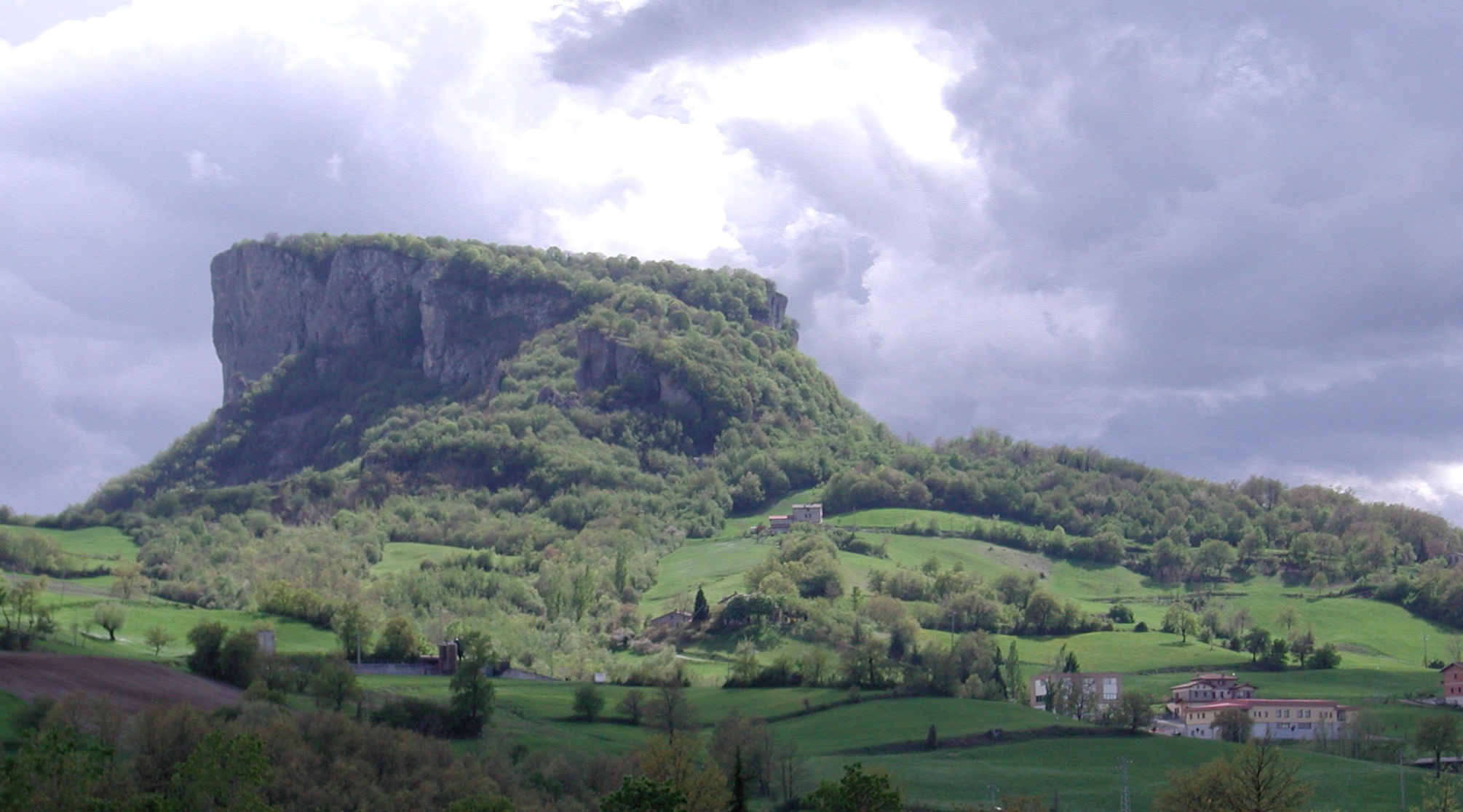
Pietra di Bismantova, Italy

- Il Gargano, Vieste, Apulia
- Palmarola, Sicily
- Pietra di Bismantova, Reggiano Apennines
- Valle Seriana, Bergamo, Lombardy
- Golfo di Orosei, Cala Luna, Monte Tiscali, Sardinia
- Tarpeian Rock
- The thrown stones, Lazio

=== Latvia ===
- Vidzeme
- Pusena Kalns, Bartava

=== North Macedonia ===
- Stone town of Kuklica
- Markovi Kuli

=== Malta ===
- Dwerja, Gozo
- Dingli Cliffs, Dingli
- Malta Escarpment (underwater)

=== Isle of Man ===
- Glen Maye, Isle of Man

=== Norway ===
- Skude, Beiningen, Haugaland
- Geirangerfjord
- Preikestolen
- Kjerag
- Troll Wall
- Nigardsbreen, part of the larger glacier Jostedalsbreen
- Sommarøy, Tromsø
- Jutulhogget (Rondane)
- Trolltunga

=== Poland ===
- Cudgel of Hercules – monadnock in Ojców National Park
- Mnich
- Słoneczna
- Kościeliska Valley, Western Tatras
- Dunajec River Gorge, Zakopane

=== Portugal ===
- Ponta da Piedade, Lagos, Algarve
- Albufeira
- Porto Moniz, Madeira
- Ponta de Sao Lourenco, Madeira

=== Romania ===
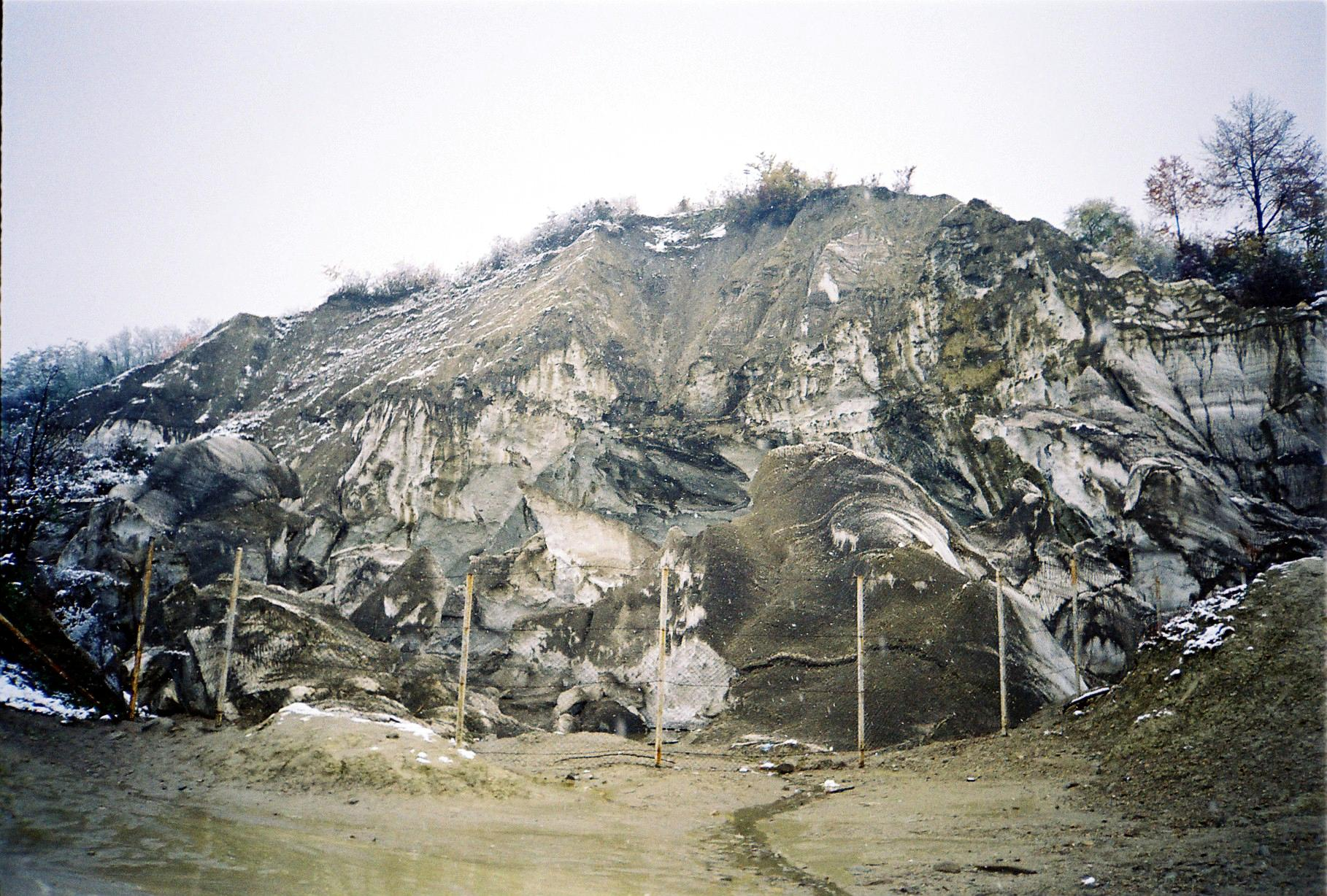
The collapsed Bride's Cave (Salt Mountain) from Slănic, Romania

- Apuseni Mountains: Detunatele
- Bucegi Mountains: Babele, The Sphinx
- Ciucaș Mountains: Porumbelul Bratocei, Colții Bratocei, Turnul Goliat, Babele la sfat, etc.
- Făgăraş Mountains: Fereastra zmeilor
- Hășmaș Mountains: Piatra singuratică
- Piatra Craiului Mountains: La zaplaz, Cerdacul Stanciului, Turnul/Degetul lui Anghelide
- Gorges: Bicaz Gorge, Turda Gorge, Danube's Iron Gate (includes Babacai Rock), Cheile Dobrogei, Cheile Sohodolului, Cheile Doftanei (aka Brebului)
- Piatra Secuiului in Alba County
- Piatra Verde (or Muntele Verde) and the Salt Mountain in Slănic
- Râpa Roșie

=== Russia ===
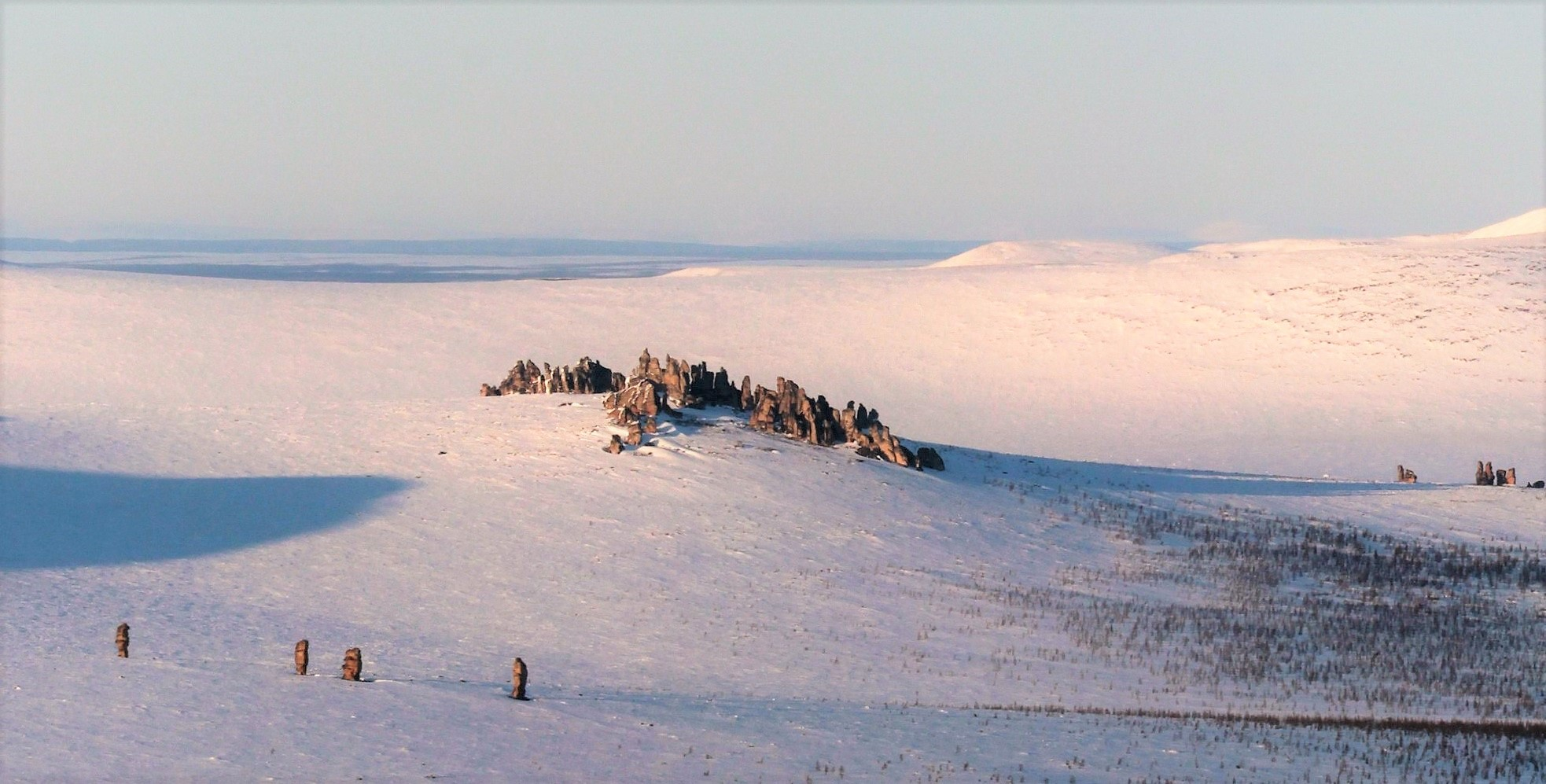
Kigilyakhs in the Ulakhan-Sis Range.

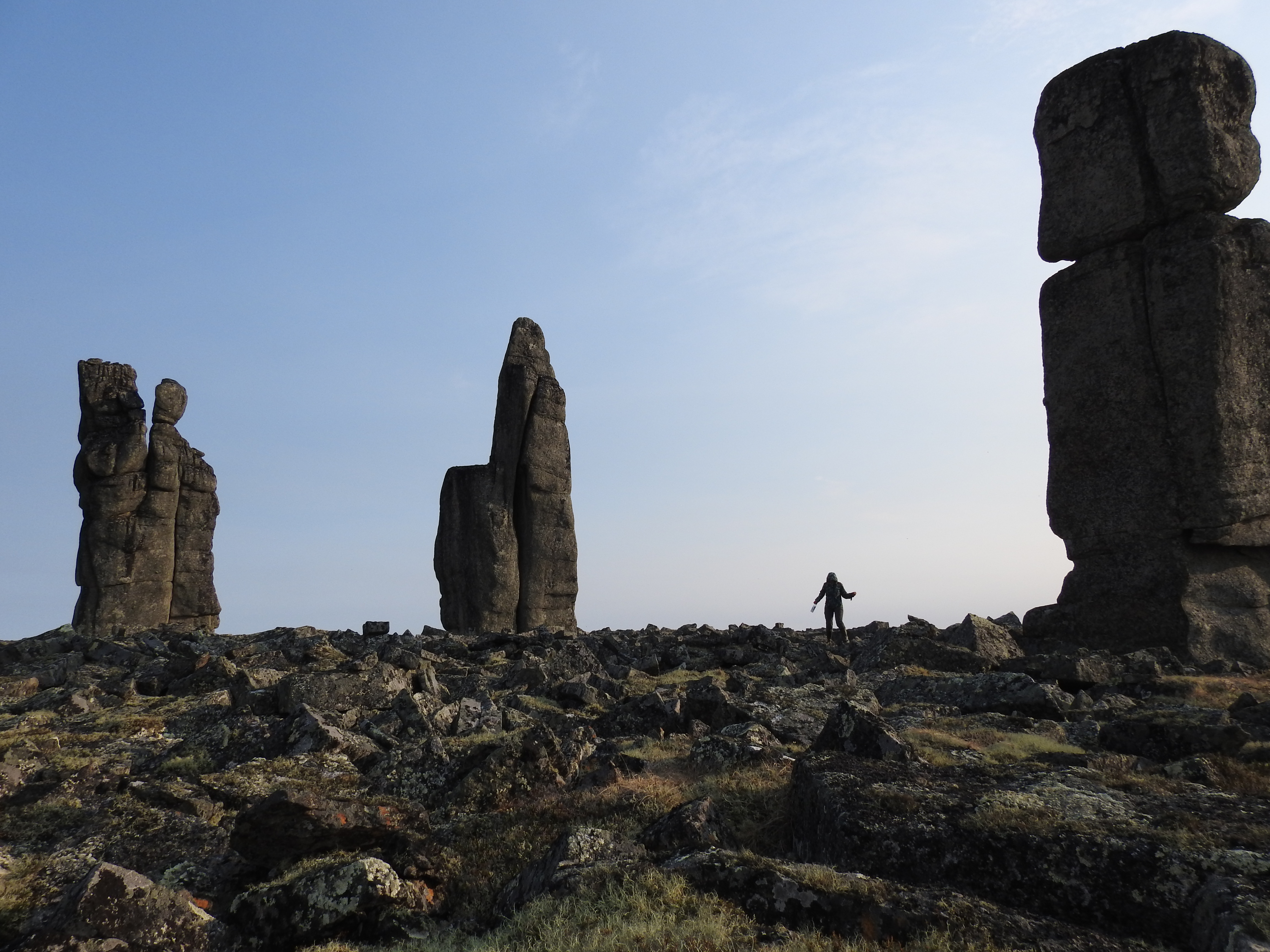
Human figure dwarfed by huge rock formations of the Ulakhan-Sis Range, Sakha (Yakutia), Siberia, Russia

- The Three Brothers, Busani, Buryatia
- Kamen Shahtai, Lake Baikal
- Kisilyakh Range, Yakutia, topped by kigilyakh formations
- Kisilyakh-Tas, Yakutia, topped by kigilyakh formations
- Kontalaksky Golets, Zabaykalsky Krai
- Kyun-Tas, Yakutia, topped by kigilyakh formations
- Lena Cheeks, Irkutsk Oblast
- Lena Pillars, Yakutia
- Monrepo Park, Vyborg, St. Petersburg
- Stolby National Park, Krasnoyarsk Krai
- Sail Rock, Krasnodar Krai
- Taganay National Park, Chelyabinsk
- Ulakhan-Sis, Yakutia, topped by kigilyakh formations

=== Serbia ===
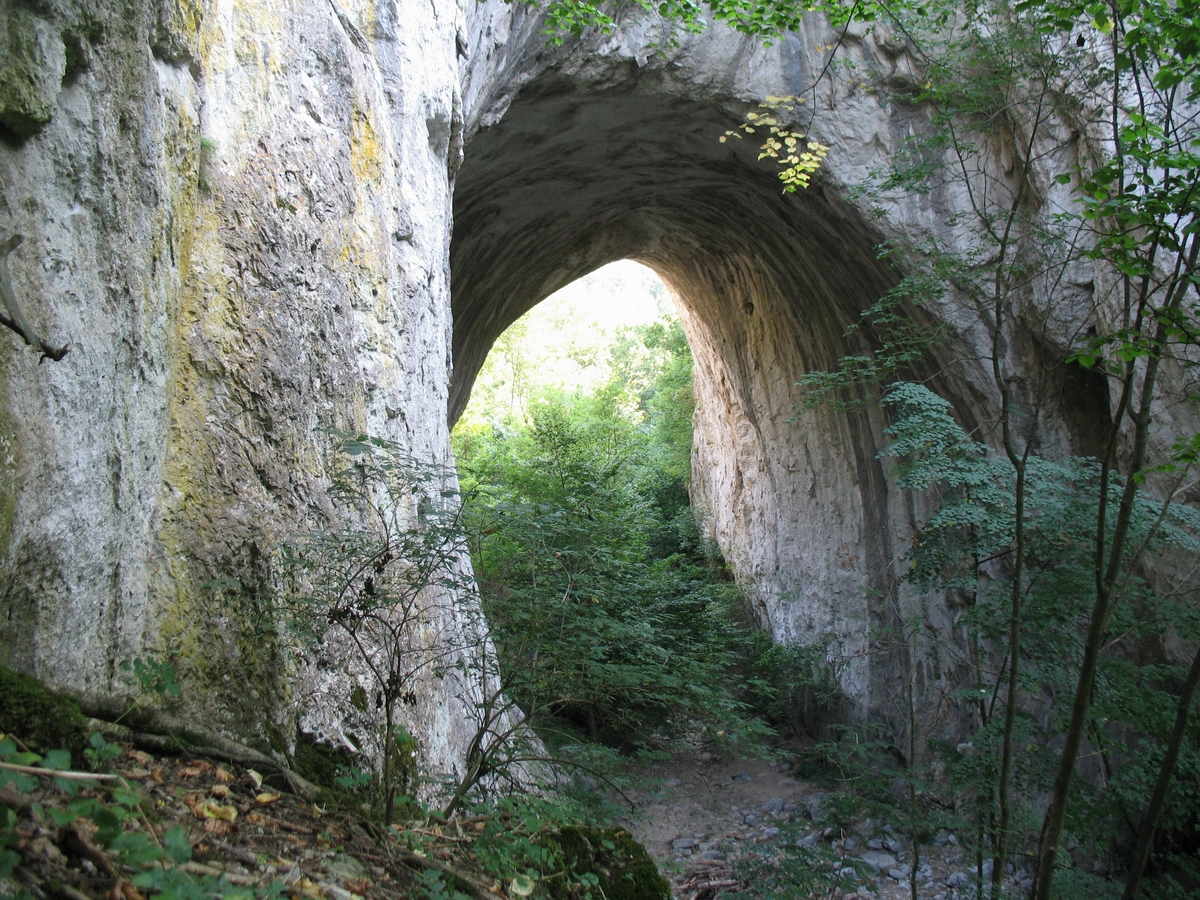
Vratna Gates natural stone bridges in Serbia

- Đavolja Varoš (Devil's Town)
- Prskalo waterfall, Kučaj mountains
- Vratna Gates three natural stone bridges
- Đavoljev kamen near Trgovište

=== Spain ===
- Acantilados de Los Gigantes, Tenerife Island, Canary Islands
- Los Roques de Garcia, Tenerife Island, Canary Islands
- Las Canades, Tenerife Island, Canary Islands
- Ciudad Encantada, Castilla–La Mancha
- Picuezo and Picueza, Autol, La Rioja
- Fuente de los Azulejos, Gran Canaria Island, Canary Islands
- El Torcal de Antequera and Peña de los Enamorados, Antequera, Andalusia, a World Heritages Sites
- Roque Nublo, Gran Canaria Island, Canary Islands
- Montserrat, Catalonia
- Roques de Benet, Ports de Beseit, Catalonia
- Los Callejones de Las Majadas, Serranía de Cuenca, Castile-La Mancha
- El Guerrero Romano, Sierra Carrascosa, Aragon
- Mallos de Riglos, Las Peñas de Riglos, Aragon
- Peña Bajenza in La Rioja
- Las Médulas, Province of León, site of Roman gold mines
- La Peña, Arcos de la Frontera, Andalusia
- Peñón de Ifach, Calpe, Valencian Community

=== Sweden ===
- The islands Gotland, Fårö and Öland have many coastal stretches with stack formations.
- Busten, Glaskogens Nature Reserve, Kalleboda
- Stegborgsgarden, Stegborg
- Stenhamra, Uppland

=== Switzerland ===
- Mount Pilatus
- Val dal Botsch

=== Slovakia ===
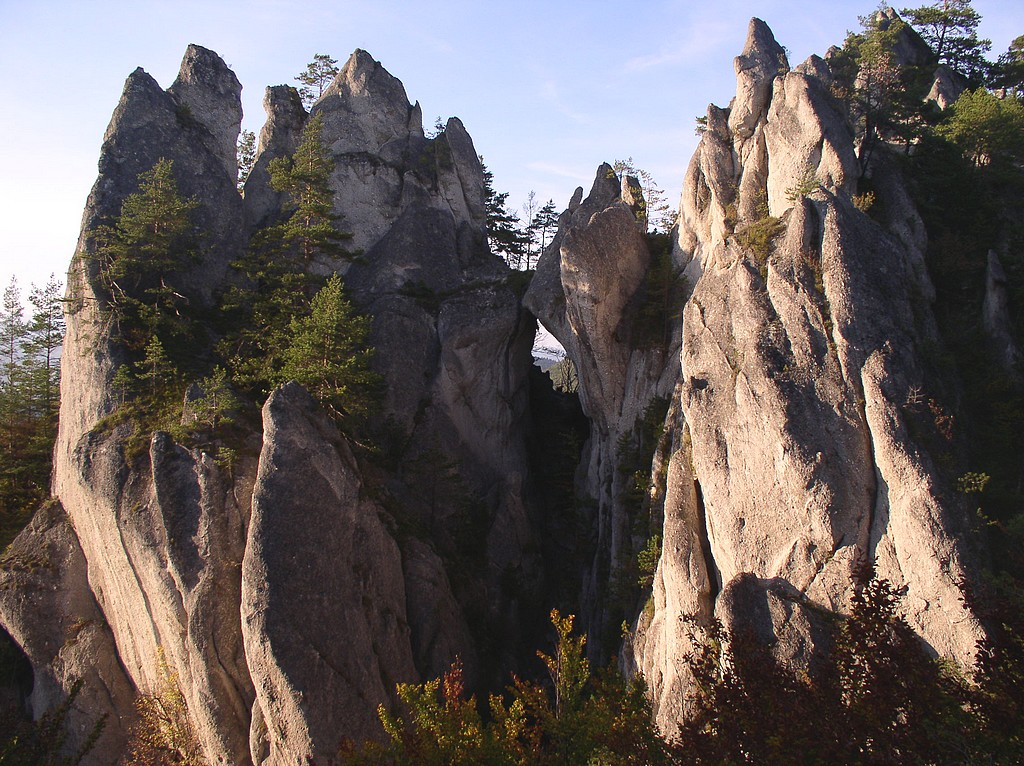
Gotická brána, Sulov rocks, Slovakia

- Lehotské skaly, near Handlová
- Haligovské skaly, near Stará Ľubovňa
- Súľovské skaly (part of the Súľovské vrchy Mountains)
- Zelené Pleso Valley (in the High Tatras)
- Devin Castle, Devin

=== Ukraine ===
- Hoverla, Carpathian Mountains
- Nikita, Ukraine, Yalta
- Skaly Taraktasky, Crimea
- Karadag, Crimea
- Cape Fiolent, Sevastopol

== Oceania ==
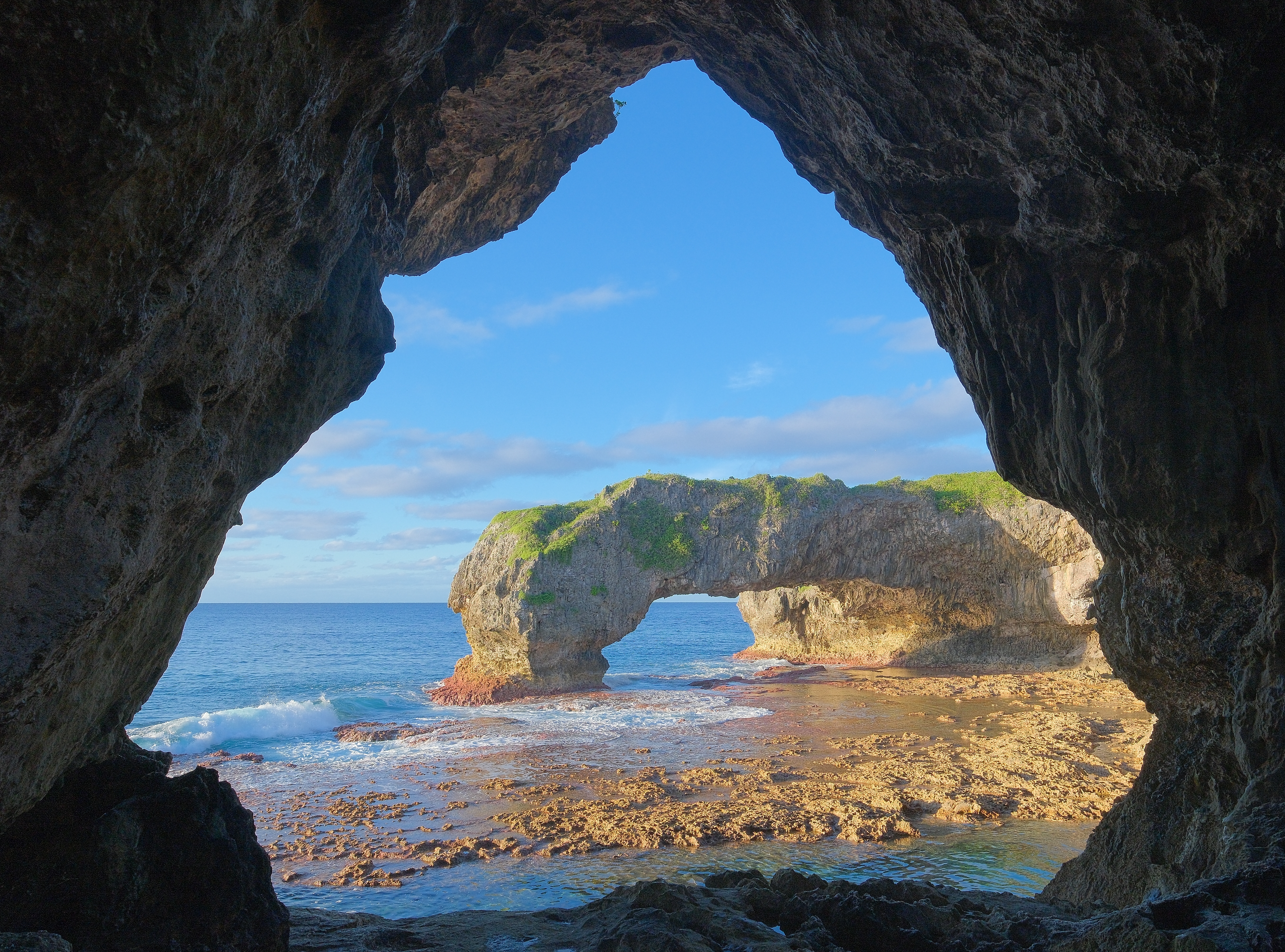
Talava arches, Niue

=== Australia ===
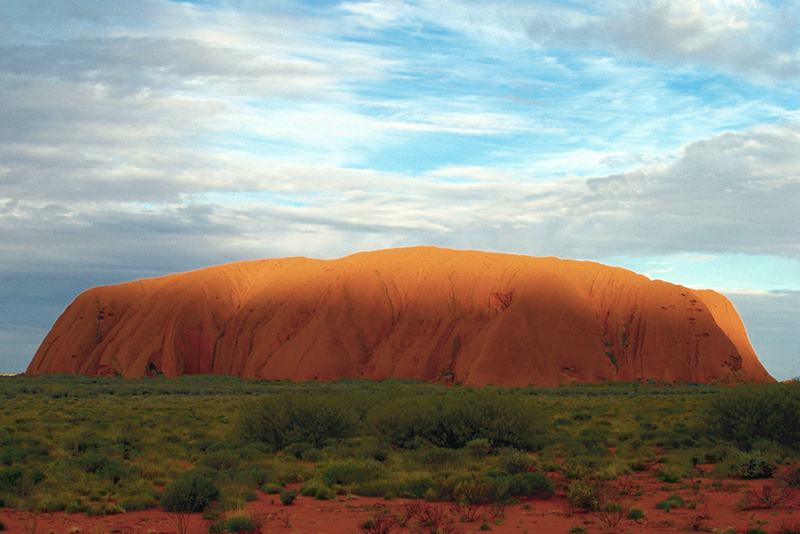
Uluru, Australia

- The Three Sisters, Katoomba – Blue Mountains, New South Wales
- Devils Marbles, Northern Territory
- Kata Tjuta, also known as The Olgas, Northern Territory
- Rainbow Valley, Northern Territory
- Uluru, also known as Ayers Rock, Northern Territory
- Murphys Haystacks, Nullarbor Desert, South Australia
- Remarkable Rocks, South Australia
- Twelve Apostles, Great Ocean Road, Victoria
- Mount Augustus, Western Australia
- Pinnacles Desert, Nambung National Park, Western Australia
- Wave Rock, Hyden, Western Australia

=== New Zealand ===
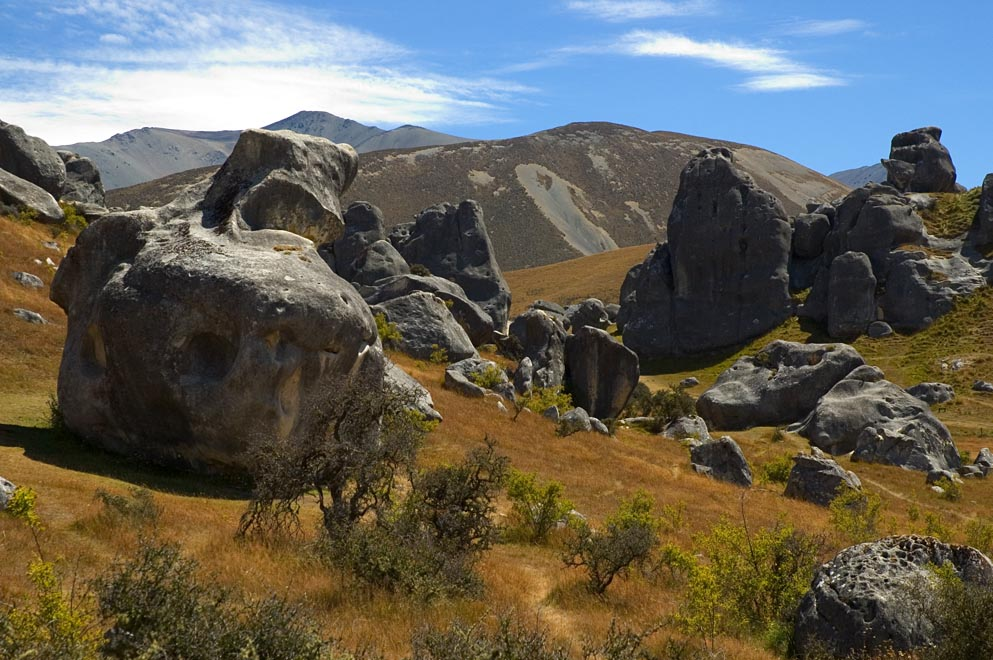
Castle Hill, New Zealand

- Castle Hill Basin, Canterbury
- Koutu Boulders, Hokianga
- Māori Bay giant pillow lava, Muriwai
- Lion Rock, Piha
- Moeraki Boulders, Otago
- The Nuggets, Catlins Coast, Otago
- Pancake Rocks, Punakaiki
- Putangirua Pinnacles, Wairarapa
- Stony Batter, Waiheke Island
- Truman Track Beach, Punakaiki
- Horeke basalts, Hokianga
- Gog and Magog, southern Stewart Island / Rakiura

=== Other countries ===
- Fatu Hiva, Marquesas Islands, French Polynesia
- Moso's Footprint, Samoa
- Talava Arches, Niue, South Pacific

== See also ==
- Formation of rocks – Geological processes by which rocks are formed
- List of individual rocks
- List of landforms
- List of rock formations that resemble human beings
- List of rocks on Mars
- Rock cycle – Transitional concept of geologic time
