= Cerro de Arcos =

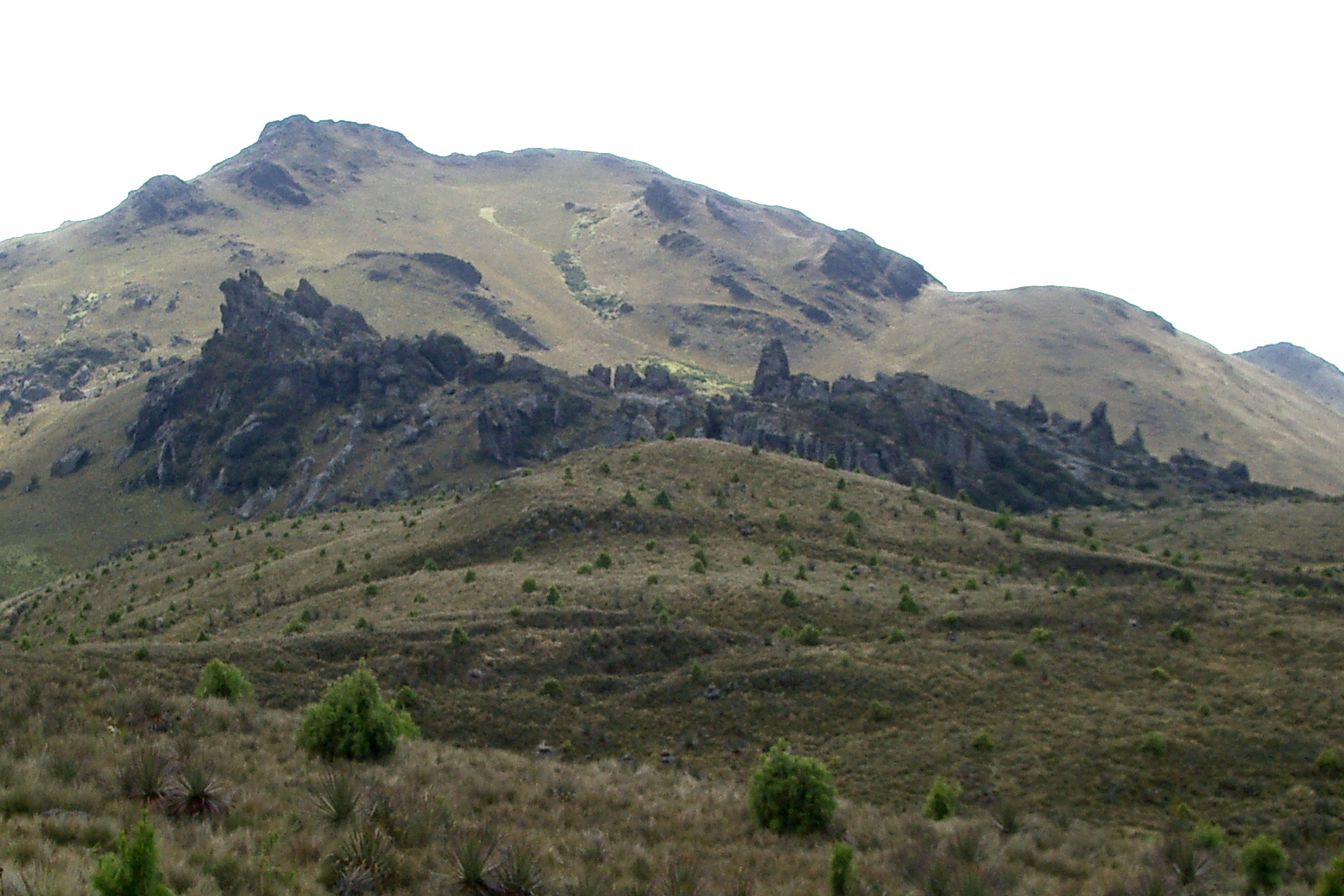
- A general view of the Cerro de Arcos (with Cerro de las Chinchas in the background)

Highest point
- Elevation: 3,700 m (12,100 ft)
- Coordinates: 03°33′51″S 79°28′10″W

Geography
- Location within Ecuador
- Location: Ecuador
- Parent range: Andes

Geology
- Rock age: Paleogene (Gomez 1994)
- Mountain type: Rock formation

Climbing
- Easiest route: Hiking

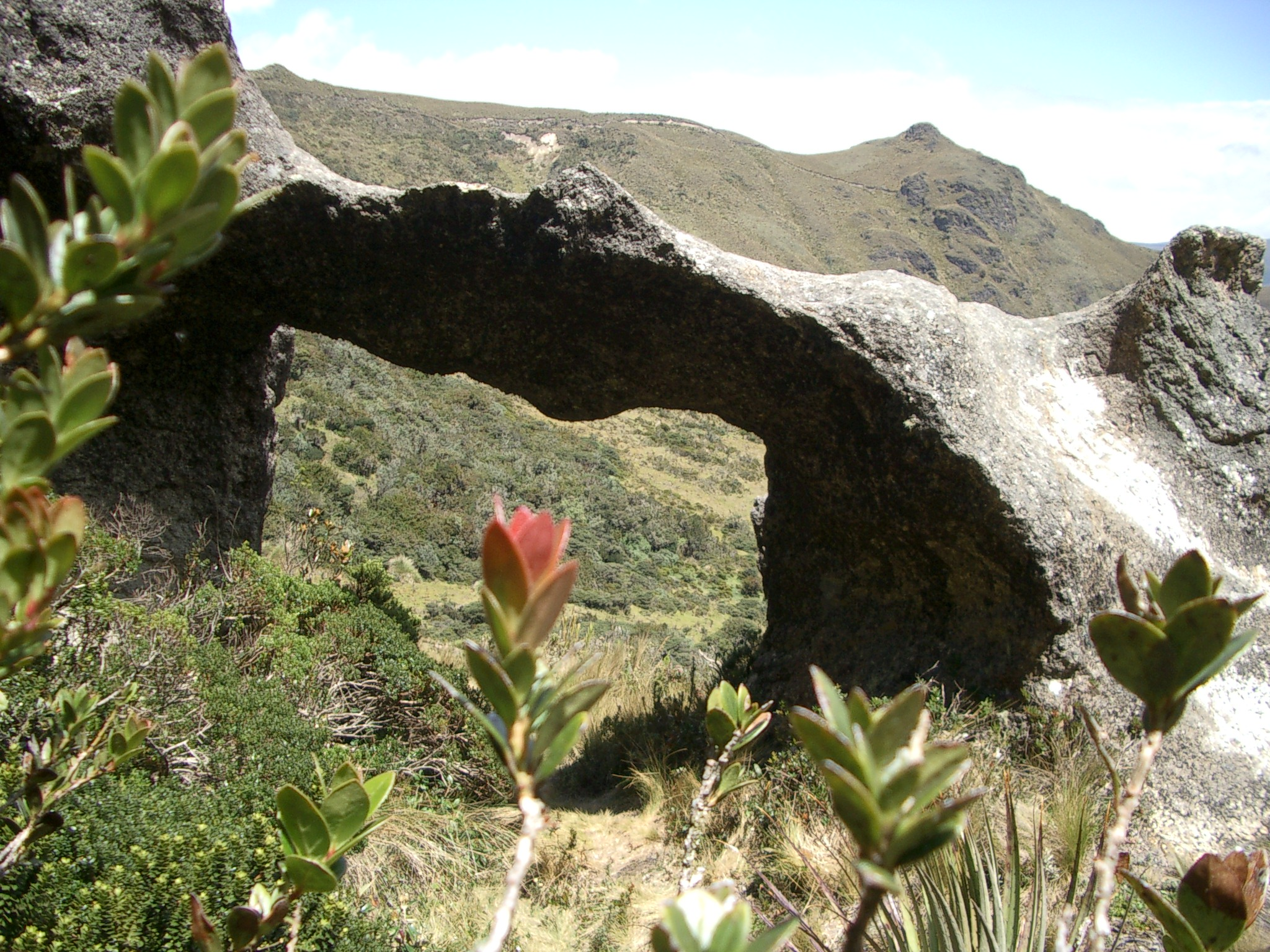
One of the arches

The Cerro de Arcos (English: Hill of arches) is a windswept rock formation in the high páramo of the Ecuadorian southern sierra. It is situated on the border between the provinces El Oro and Loja, on the elevated plain between the Cordillera de Chilla and the Cordillera de Timbayacu at an altitude of 3,700 m (12,140 ft).

The rock formation features towers, columns, and several of the eponymous arches formed by wind and weather erosion. The formation covers an area of about 300 m^{2} (3,200 ft^{2}).

Nearby populated places are Bellavista and Sabadel and the nearest villages or small towns are Zaruma and Manu.
