= Fuente de los Azulejos =

Rock formation on Gran Canaria, Canary Islands

Coordinates: 27.9218°N 15.7251°W

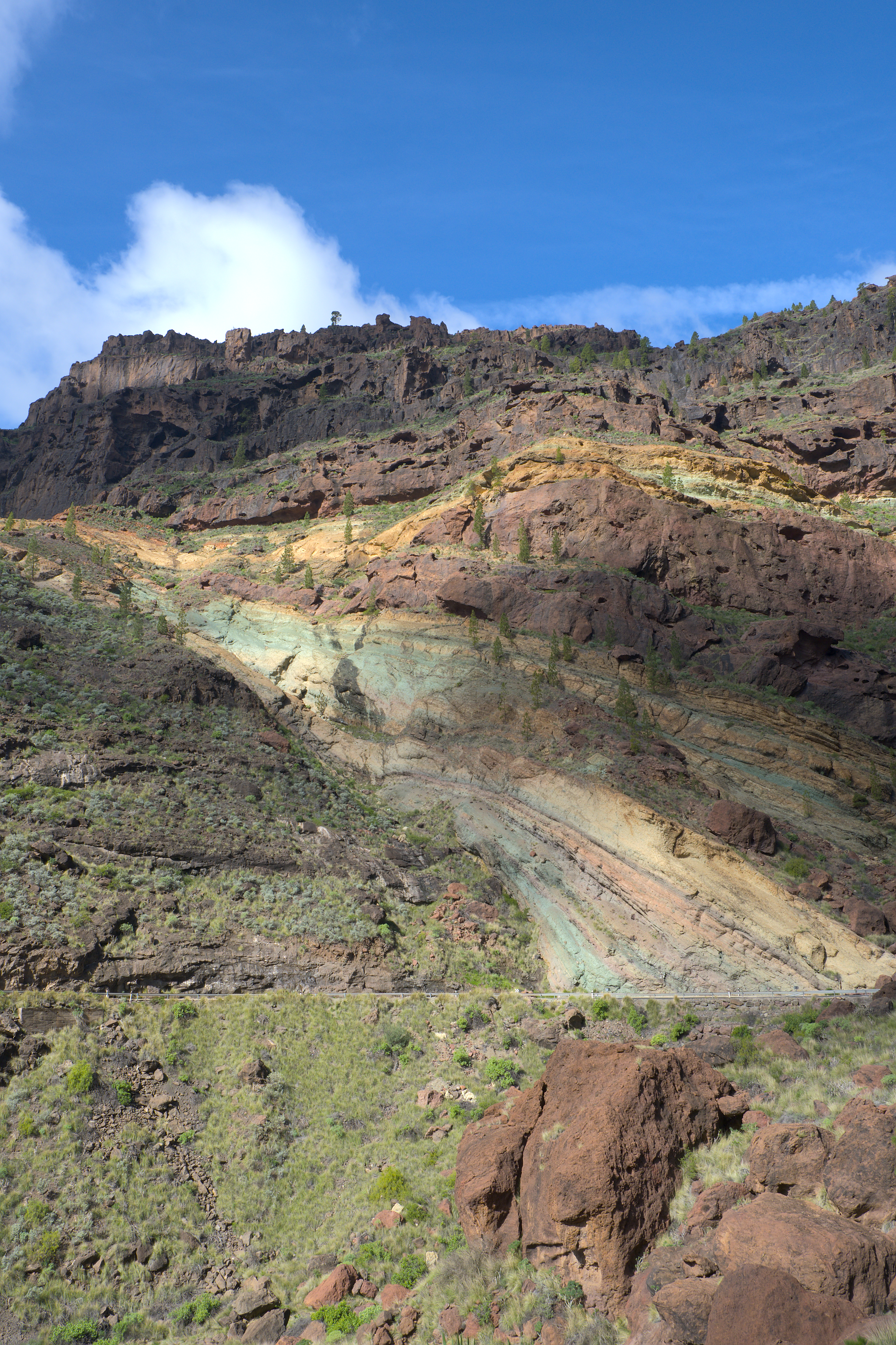
Fuente de los Azulejos rock formation

Fuente de los Azulejos is an unusual rock formation on the island of Gran Canaria. The name literally means "fountain of tiles", because of the colour of the rocks resembling Portuguese tiles. These colours are caused by the process of hydrothermal alteration and oxidisation.
