= Mushroom rock =

Mushroom-shaped rock formation

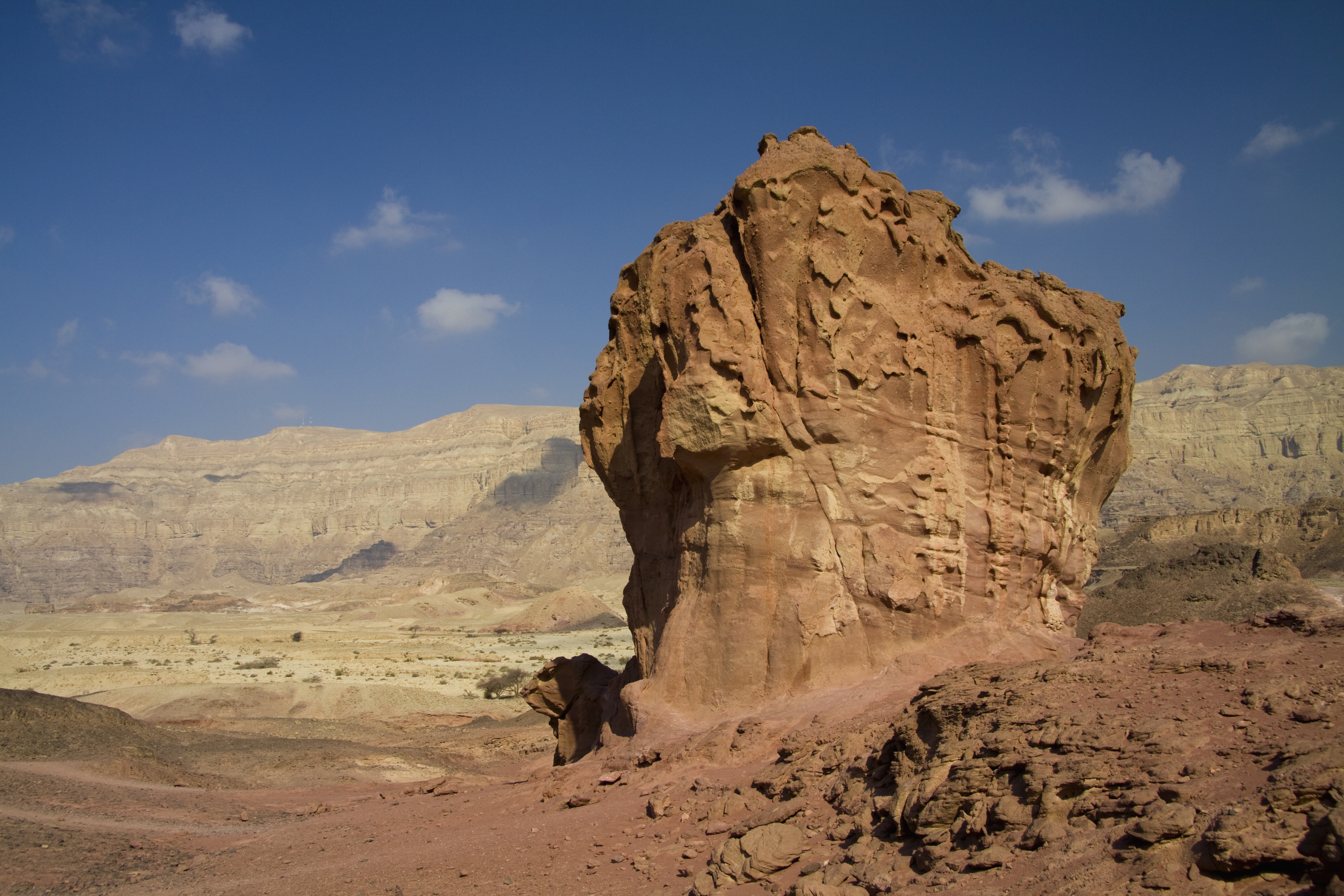
Mushroom rock in Timna Valley, Israel

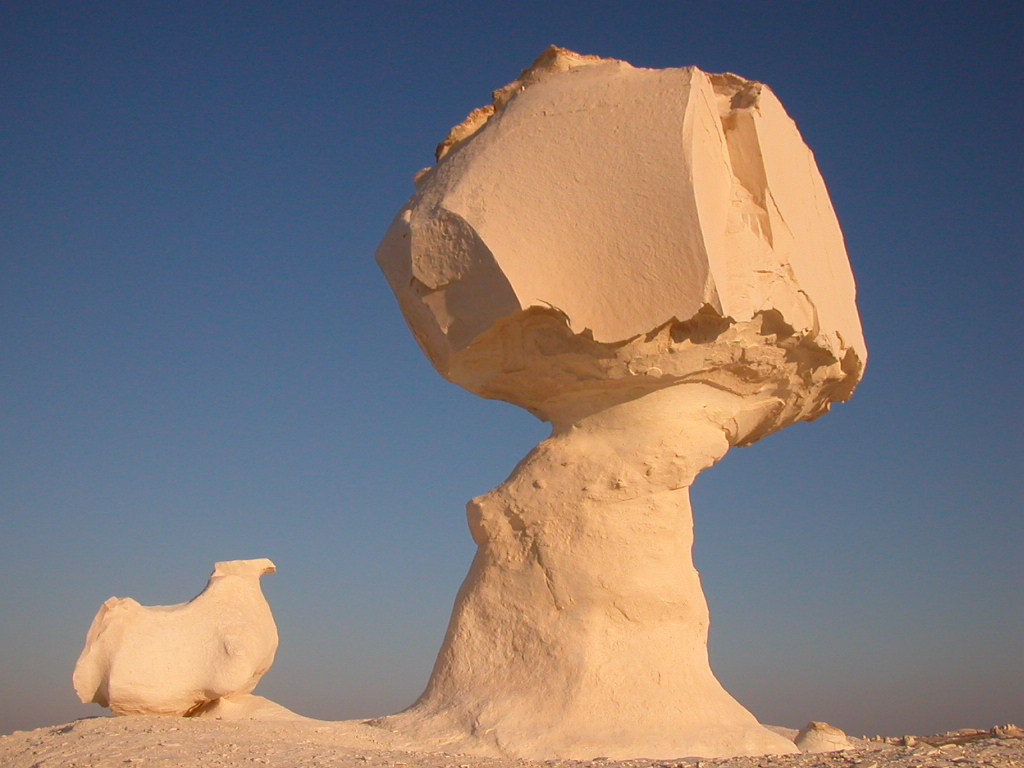
"Chicken and Mushroom" rocks in the White Desert, Egypt

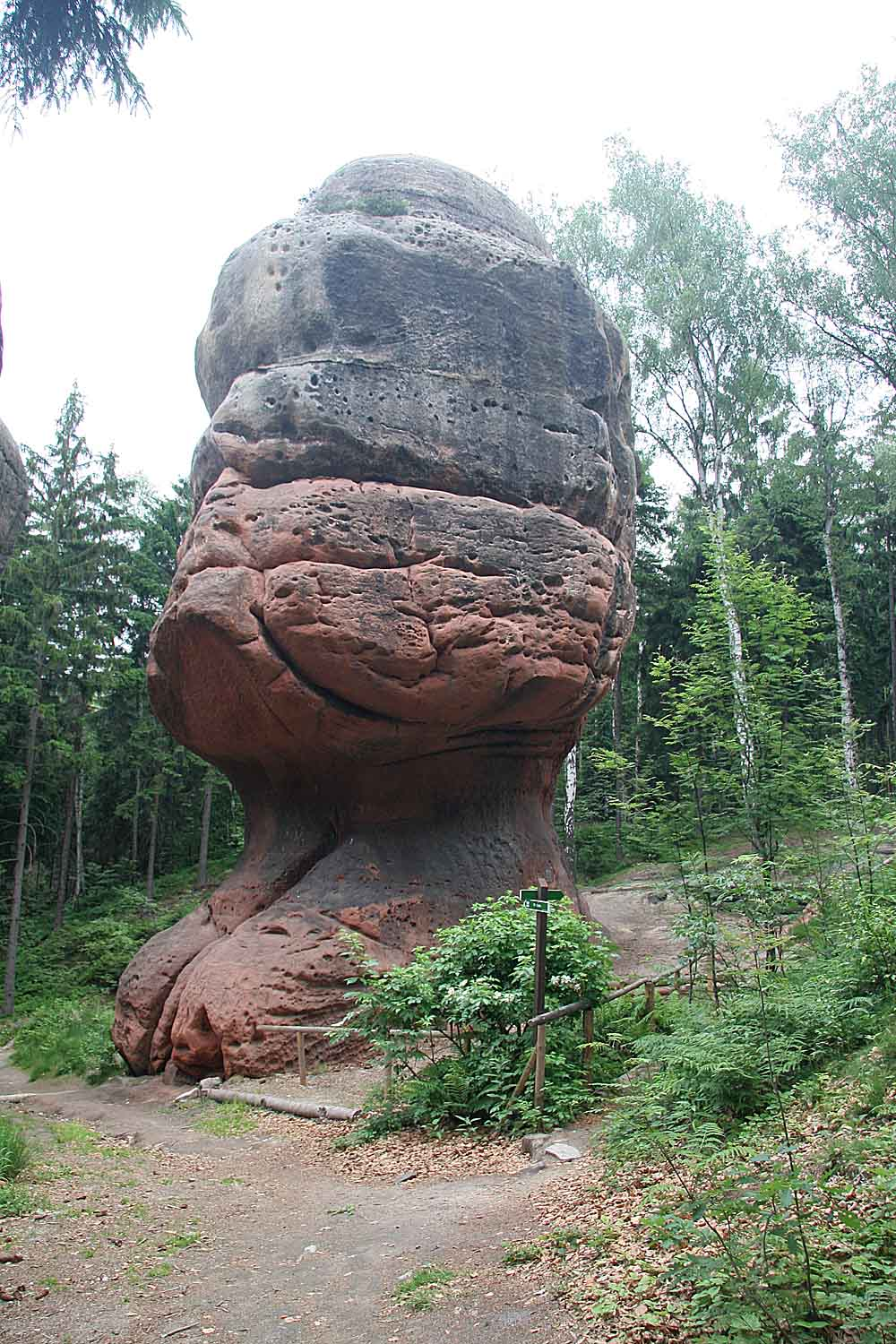
The Kelchstein ("Chalice Rock") near Oybin, Lusatian Mountains, Germany

A mushroom rock, also called a pedestal rock, rock pedestal, or gour, is a naturally occurring rock whose shape, as its name implies, resembles a mushroom. The rocks are deformed in a number of different ways: by erosion and weathering, glacial action, or from a sudden disturbance. Mushroom rocks are related to, but different from, yardang.

== Erosion ==
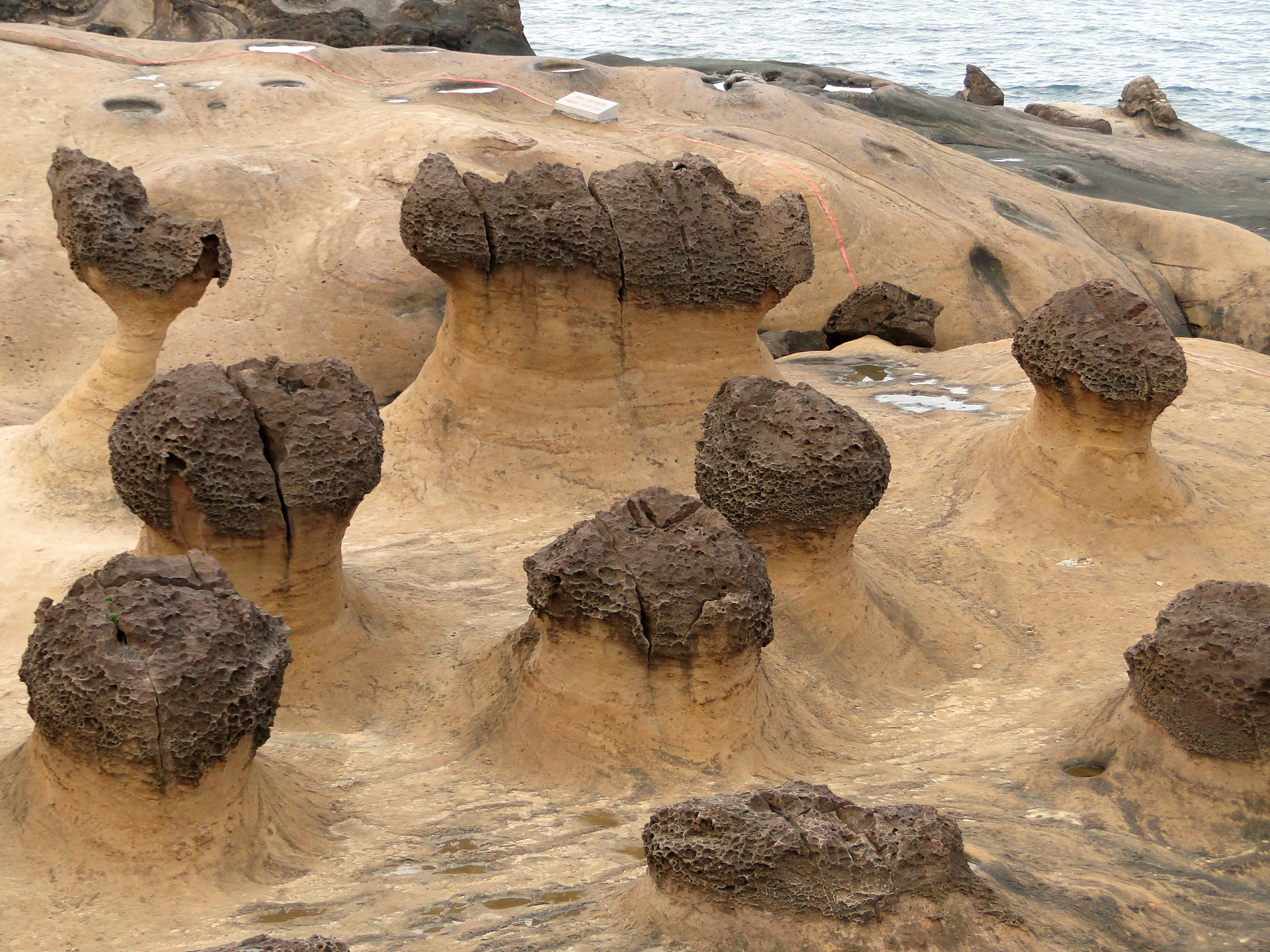
Mushroom rocks in Taiwan, Yehliu

Usually found in desert areas, these rocks form over thousands of years when wind erosion of an isolated rocky outcrop progresses at a different rate at its bottom than at its top. Abrasion by wind-borne grains of sand is most prevalent within the first three feet (0.9 m) above the ground, causing the bases of outcrops to erode more rapidly than their tops. Running water can have the same effect. An example of this type of mushroom rock is the one in Timna Park, Israel.

Occasionally, the chemical composition of the rocks can be an important factor; if the upper part of the rock is more resistant to chemical erosion and weathering, it erodes more slowly than the base. For example, erosion attributed to chemical weathering at the base of the rock due to the collection of dew near the surface.

A mushroom rock may ultimately form from an originally flat area of hard rock overlying soft rock, similar to the pattern of rocks that form a waterfall. Weathering of the exposed hard rock layer eventually exposes the lower rock to erosion from wind, water, salt intrusion, etc., depending on local conditions. The layer of softer rock is more readily eroded, leading to the formation of a depression or blowout. The overlying harder rocks are resistant to this process, and may ultimately end up as isolated mushroom rocks standing above the new, lower plain.

The nature of wind erosion is that it concentrates a few feet over the ground - wind speeds increase with height, but sediment load reduces. This means that the combination of highest sediment loads and fastest wind speed exist a few feet over the ground, leading to the characteristic narrowing of the support pedestal at this height.

== Glacial action ==
In contrast to a mushroom rock formed by erosion of a single rock, these mushrooms are a type of balancing rock that formed from two separate rocks, one of which came to rest on top of the other. Typically, the uppermost rock was transported and deposited by the slow action of a glacier. The lower part of the rock formation might or might not have also undergone a degree of erosion to accentuate the mushroom shape.

== Examples ==
- Sierra de Órganos National Park, Sombrerete, Mexico
- Ciudad Encantada, Cuenca, Castile-La Mancha, Spain
- Goblin Valley State Park, Utah, United States
- Gülşehir, Nevşehir, Turkey
- Mushroom Rock State Park, Kansas, United States
- Phae Mueang Phi, Thailand
- The stone mushrooms, Bulgaria
- Hopewell Rocks, New Brunswick, Canada
- White Desert, Egypt
- Wadi Rum, Jordan
- Chulyshman Valley, Russia

== See also ==
- Aeolian processes
- Hoodoo (geology)
- Precarious boulder
- Ventifact
