= Krishna's Butterball =

Monument in Mahabalipuram

- Balancing rock
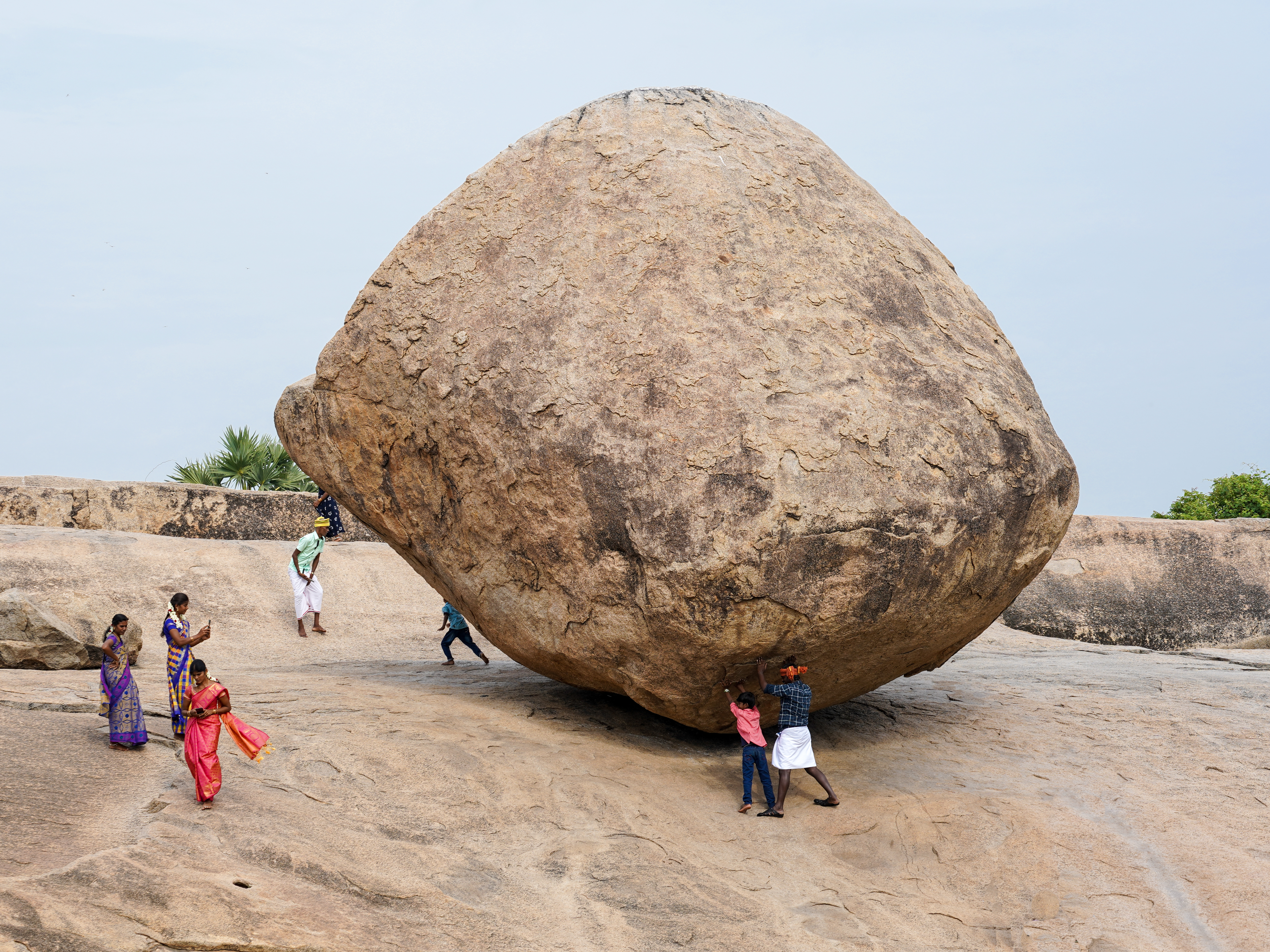
- Interactive map of Krishna's Butterball
- Coordinates: 12.6191°N 80.1923°E
- Location: Mamallapuram, Tamil Nadu, India
- Geology: Granite
- Designation: Centrally Protected Monument (Archeological Survey of India); Part of Group of Monuments at Mahabalipuram (UNESCO World Heritage Site)
- Other names: Vaan Irai Kal

Krishna's Butterball (also known as Vaan Irai Kal and Krishna's Gigantic Butterball) is a gigantic balancing rock, a granite boulder resting on a short incline in the historical coastal resort town of Mamallapuram in Tamil Nadu state, India.

Being part of the Group of Monuments at Mamallapuram, a UNESCO World Heritage Site built during the seventh- and eighth-century CE as Hindu religious monuments by the Pallava dynasty, it is a popular tourist attraction locally. It is listed as a protected national monument by the Archeological Survey of India.

== Etymology ==
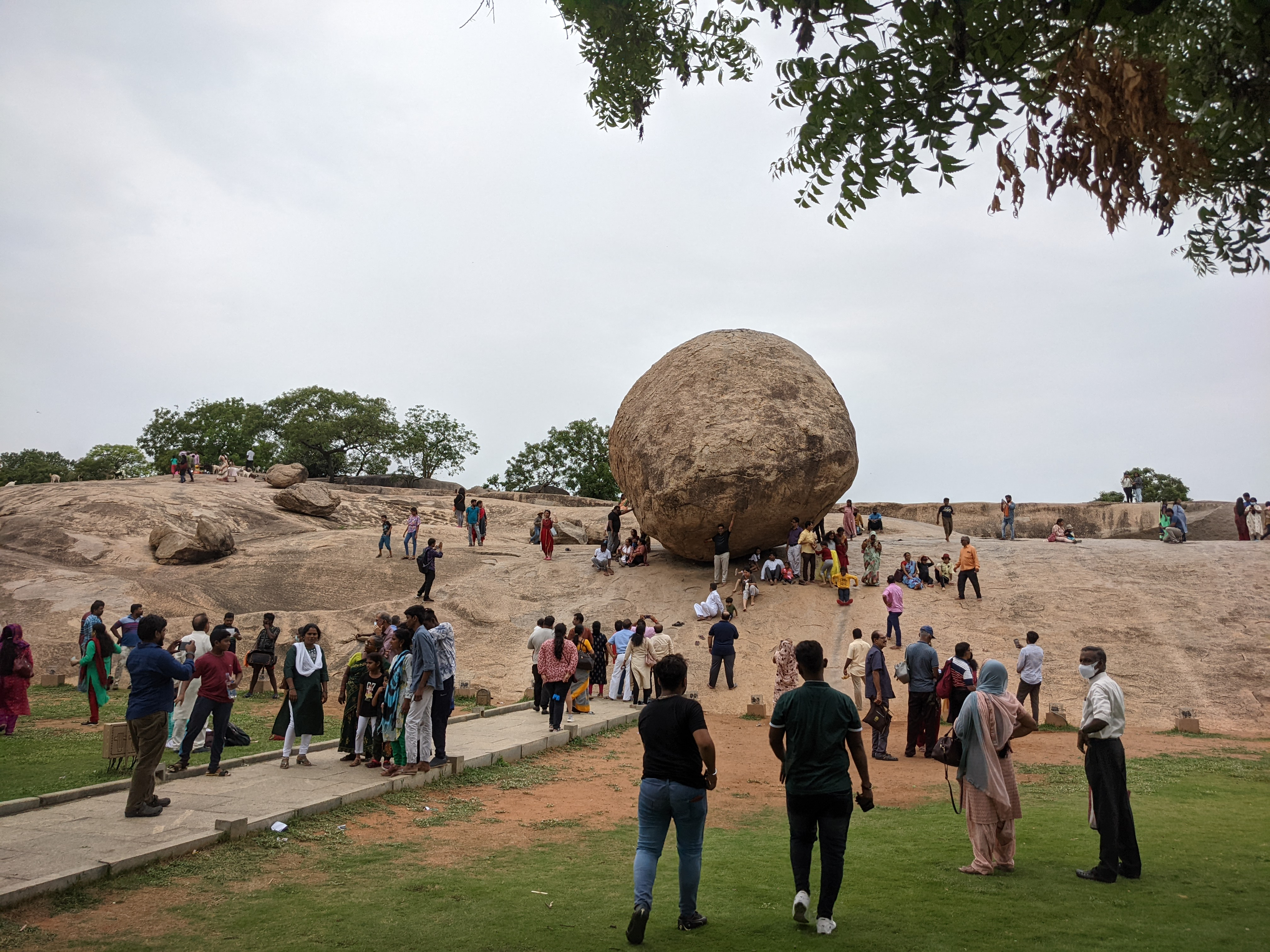
People visiting Krishna's Butterball

The original name, Vaan Irai Kal (வான் இறைக்கல்), according to the Atlas Obscura, translates from Tamil as "Stone of Sky God". According to Hindu scriptures, Krishna often stole butter from his mother's butter handi; this may have led to the namesake of the boulder. In 1969, a tour-guide is said to credit its present name, Krishna's Butterball, to Indira Gandhi who was on a tour of the city.

== History ==
The Pallava king Narasimhavarman (630–668 CE) made a failed attempt to move the boulder. The Indian Tamil king Raja Raja Chola (985 and 1014 CE) was inspired by the balance of this massive stone boulder and it led to the creation of never-falling mud dolls called Tanjavur Bommai, which having a half-spherical base tends to come back to its original position every time one tries to make it fall. In 1908, then-governor of the city Arthur Havelock made an attempt to use seven elephants to move the boulder from its position due to safety concerns but with no success. On 12 October 2019, Indian Prime Minister Narendra Modi and General Secretary of the Chinese Communist Party Xi Jinping took a photo in front of Krishna's Butterball holding hands during their second "informal summit".

== Details ==
Krishna's Butterball is located in the tourist town Mahabalipuram in Chengalpattu district in the state of Tamil Nadu in south India. It is easily accessible via the East Coast Road (ECR) at a distance of 55 km (34 mi) from Chennai Central railway station and 53 km (33 mi) from Chennai International Airport. To the south, Pondicherry is 95 km (59 mi) distant.

The boulder is approximately six metres (20 ft) high and five metres (16 ft) wide and weighs around 250 tonnes (250 long tons; 280 short tons). It seems to float and barely stand on a slope on top of a 1.2-meter (4 ft) high plinth which is a naturally eroded hill. The rock is estimated to be 1,200 years old. A part of the boulder on top back has broken away, making it look like a half-spherical rock from the back, while it appears round shaped from the other three sides.

== Gallery ==
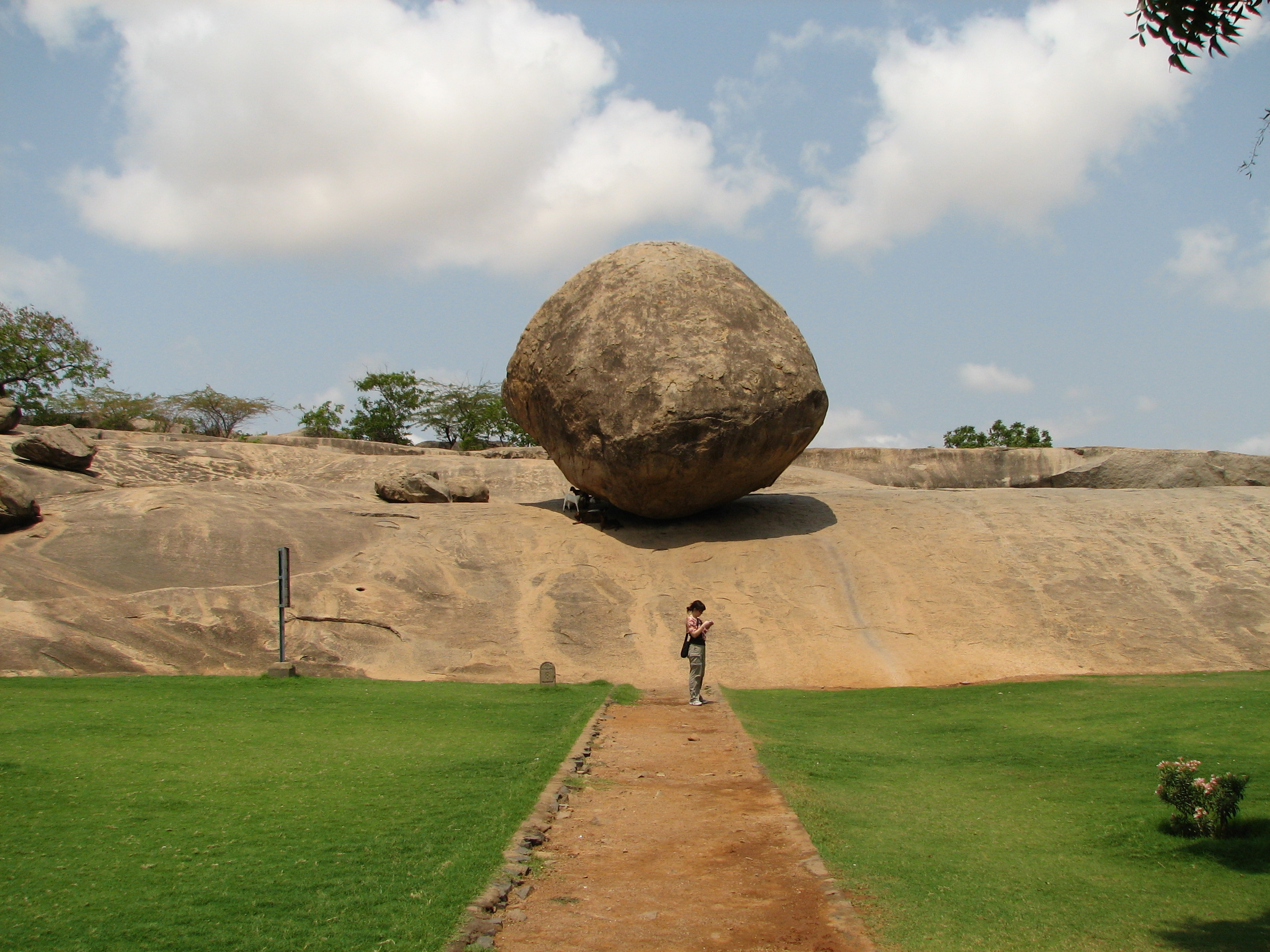
Viewed from south

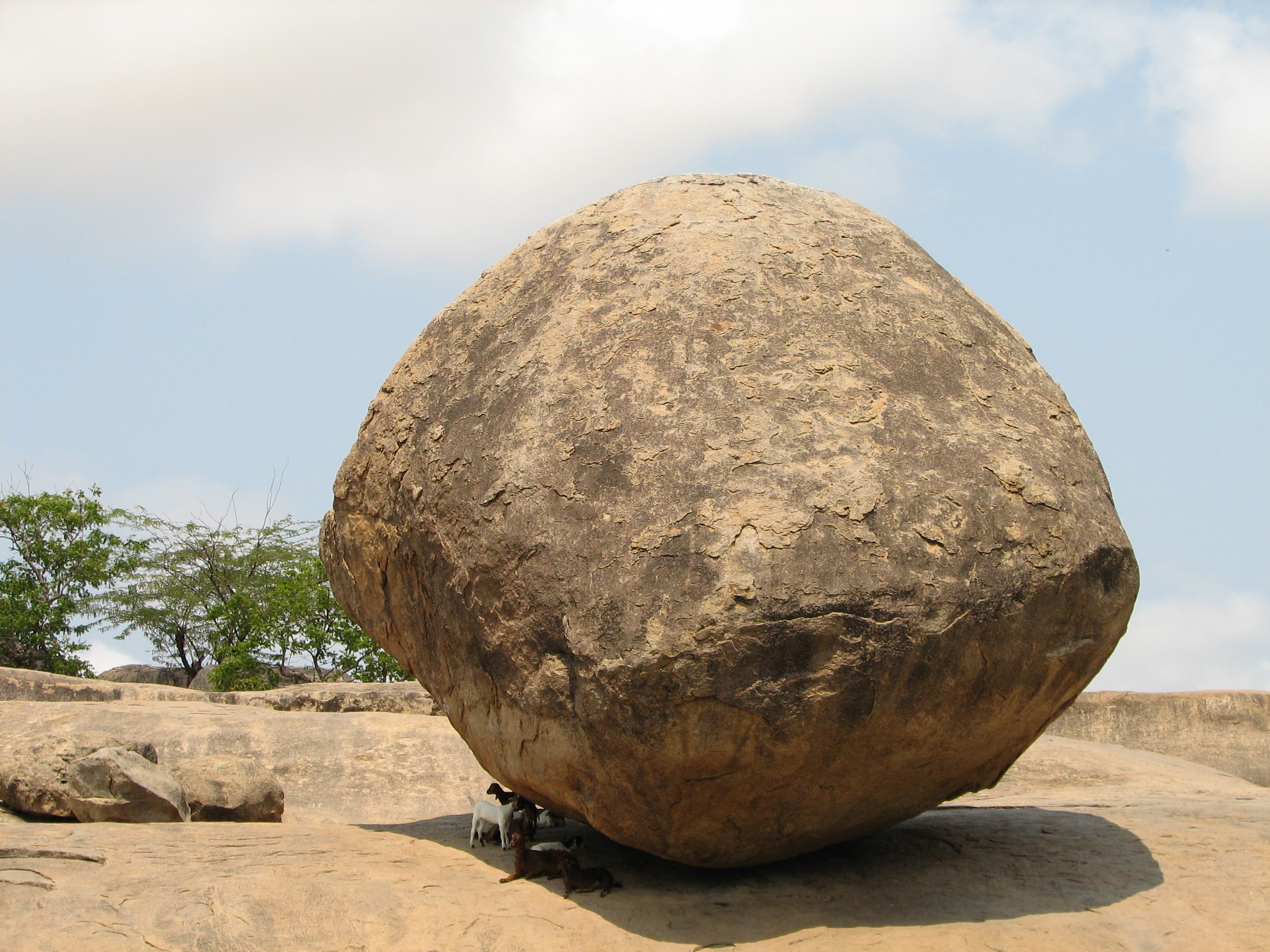
Viewed from southwest

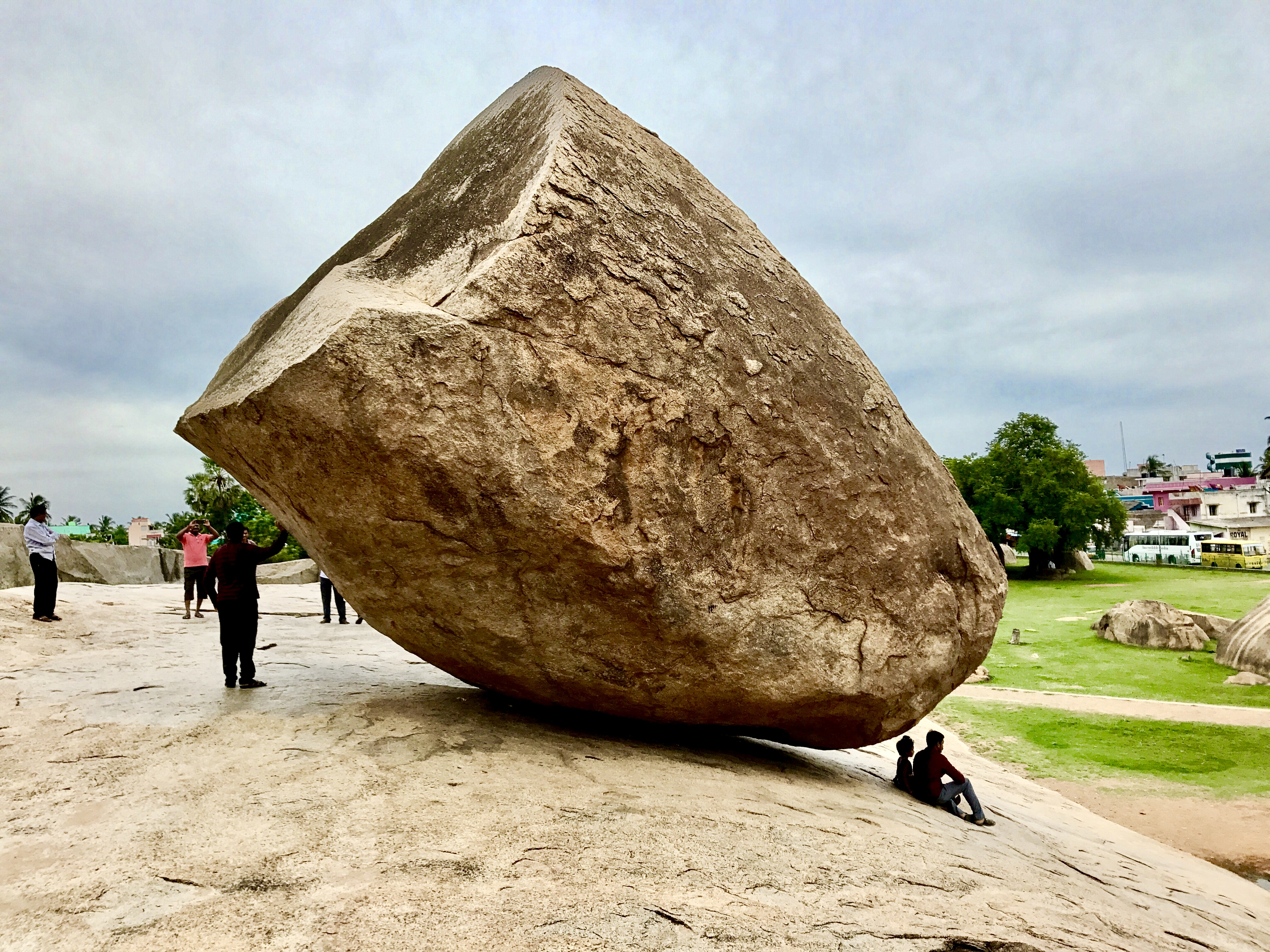
Viewed from west

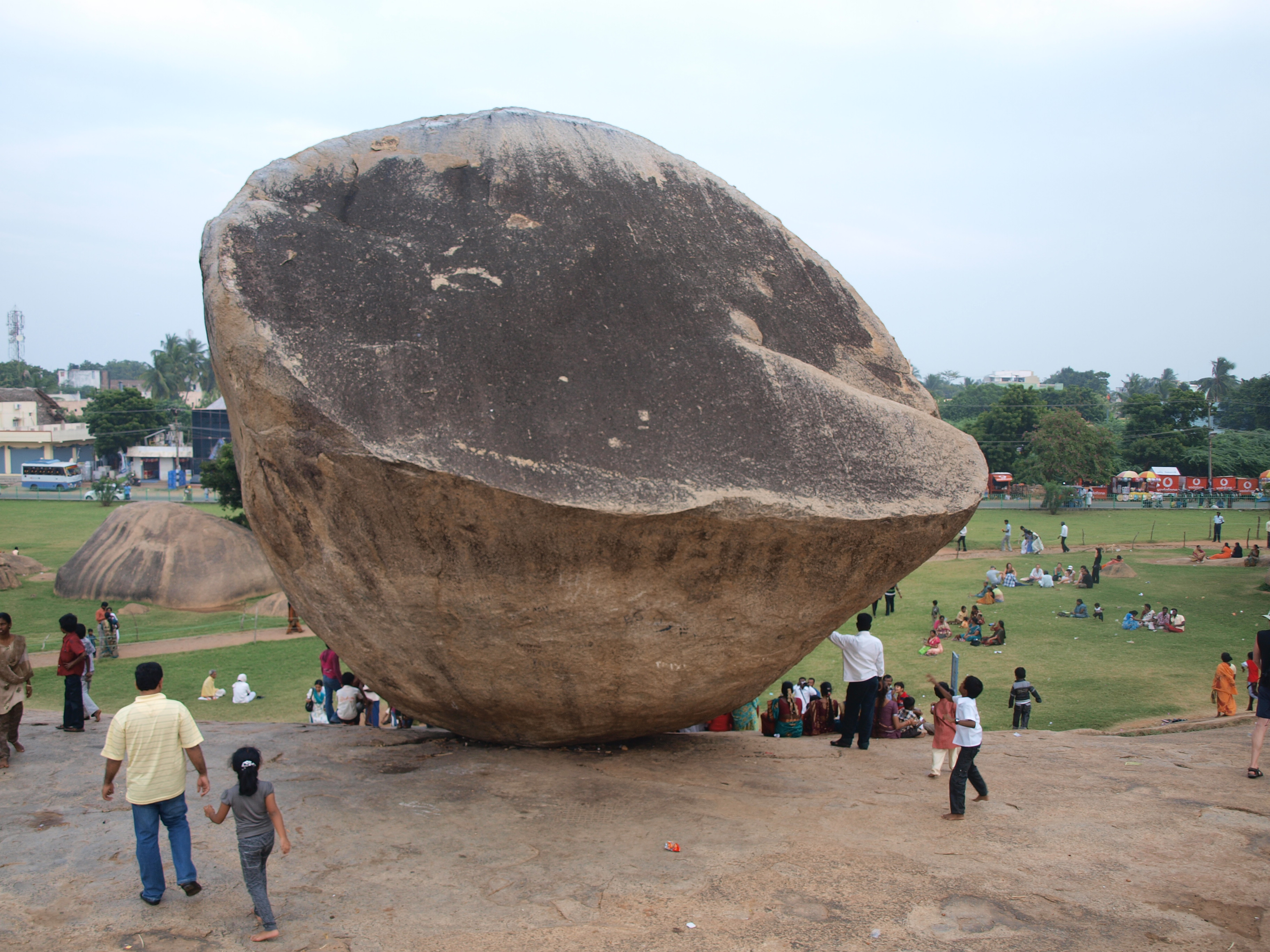
Viewed from north

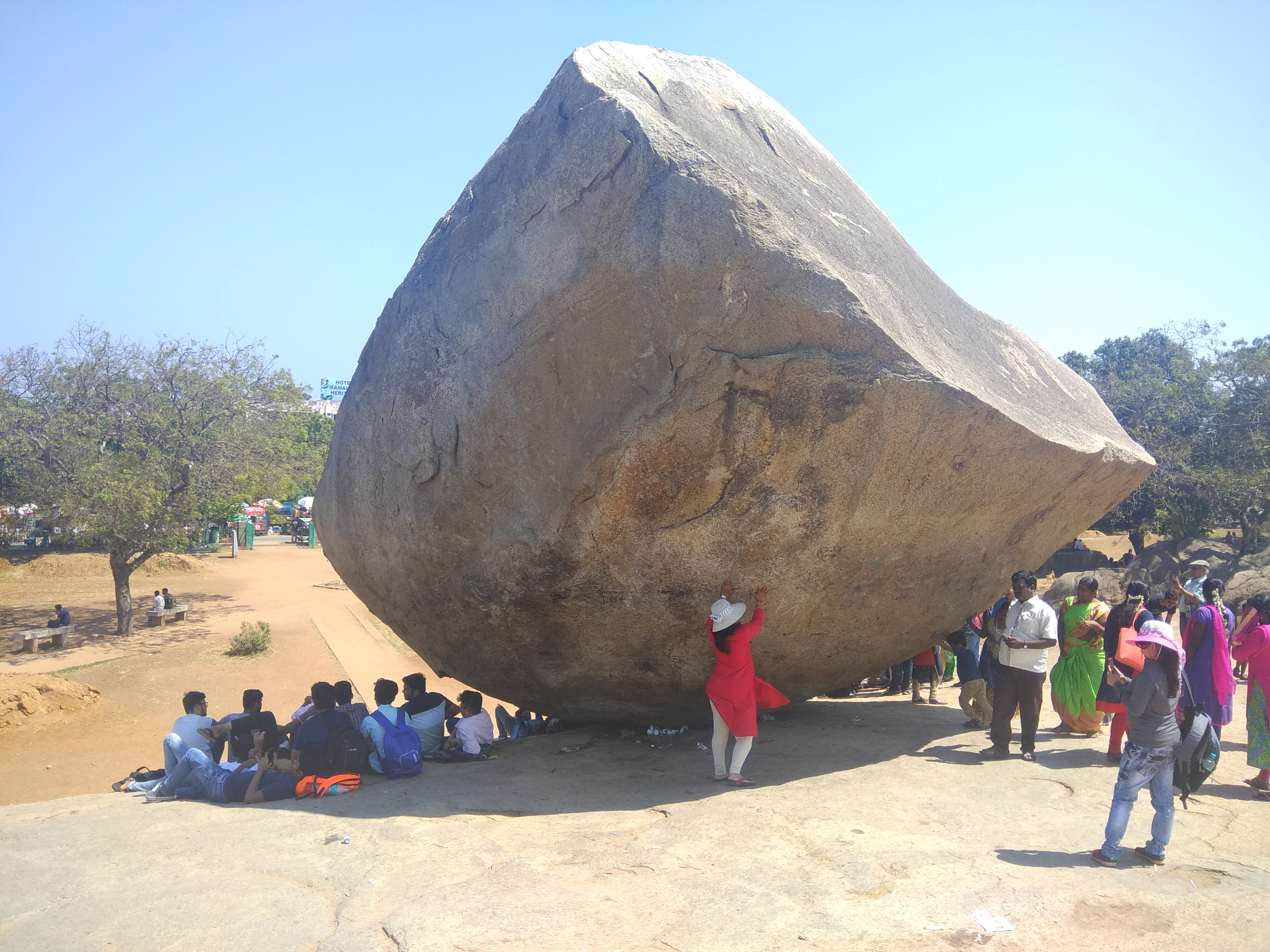
Viewed from northeast

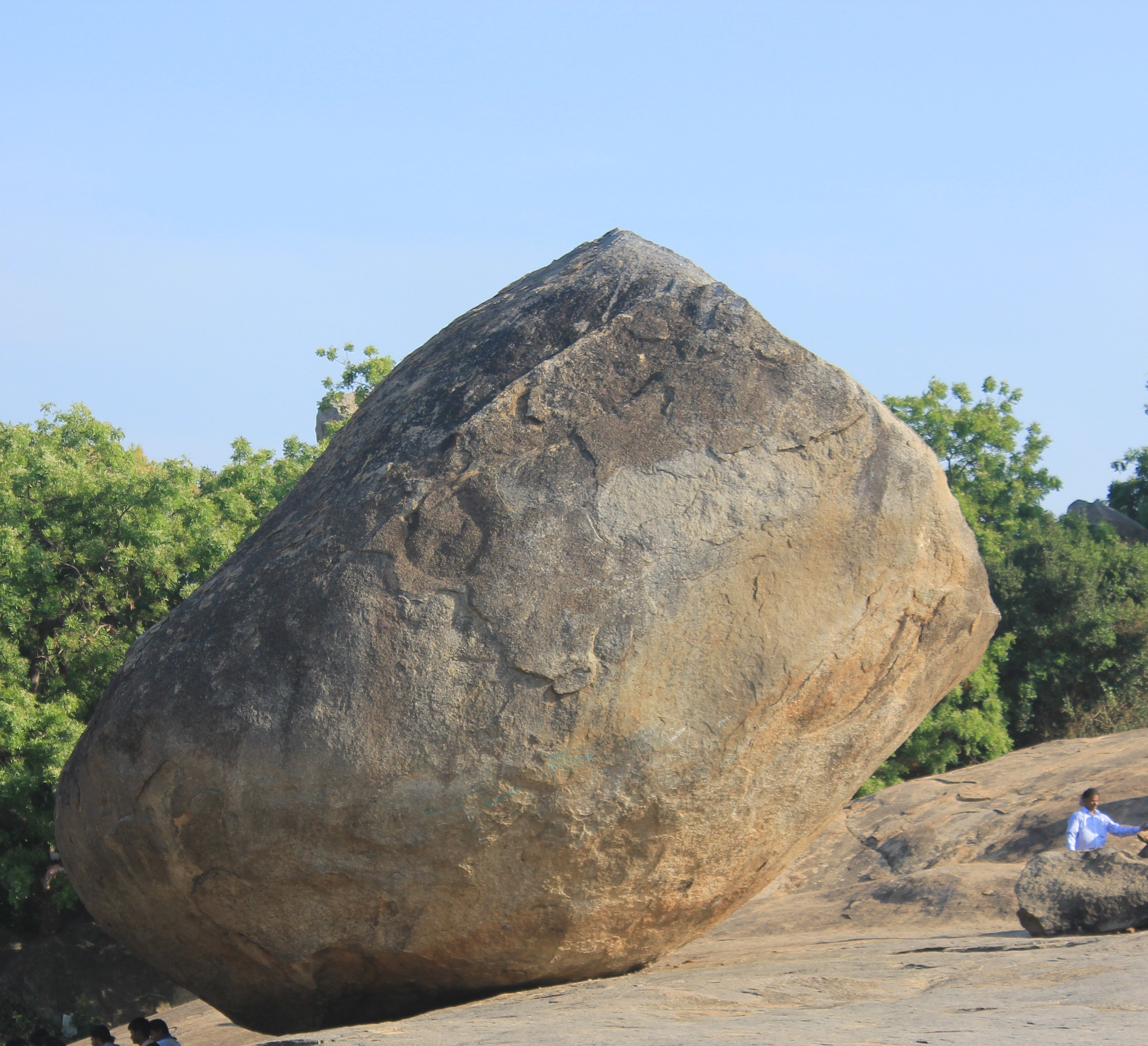
Viewed from east

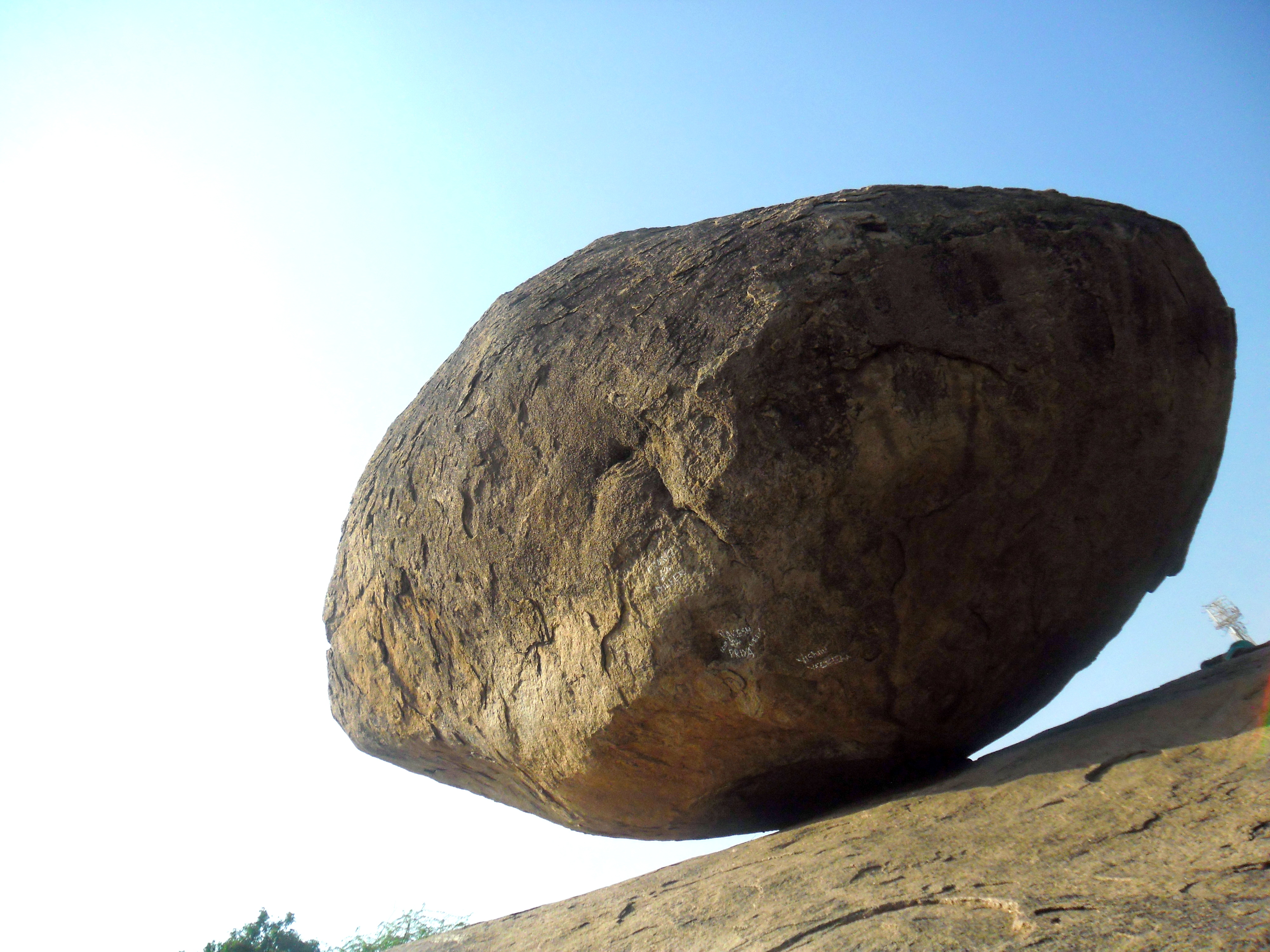
Viewed from southeast

== In media ==
- Krishna's Butterball was shown in an episode of History TV18's television infotainment show, OMG! Yeh Mera India, hosted by Krushna Abhishek.

== See also ==
- List of gravity hills in India
