= Kummakivi =

Natural landmark in Finland

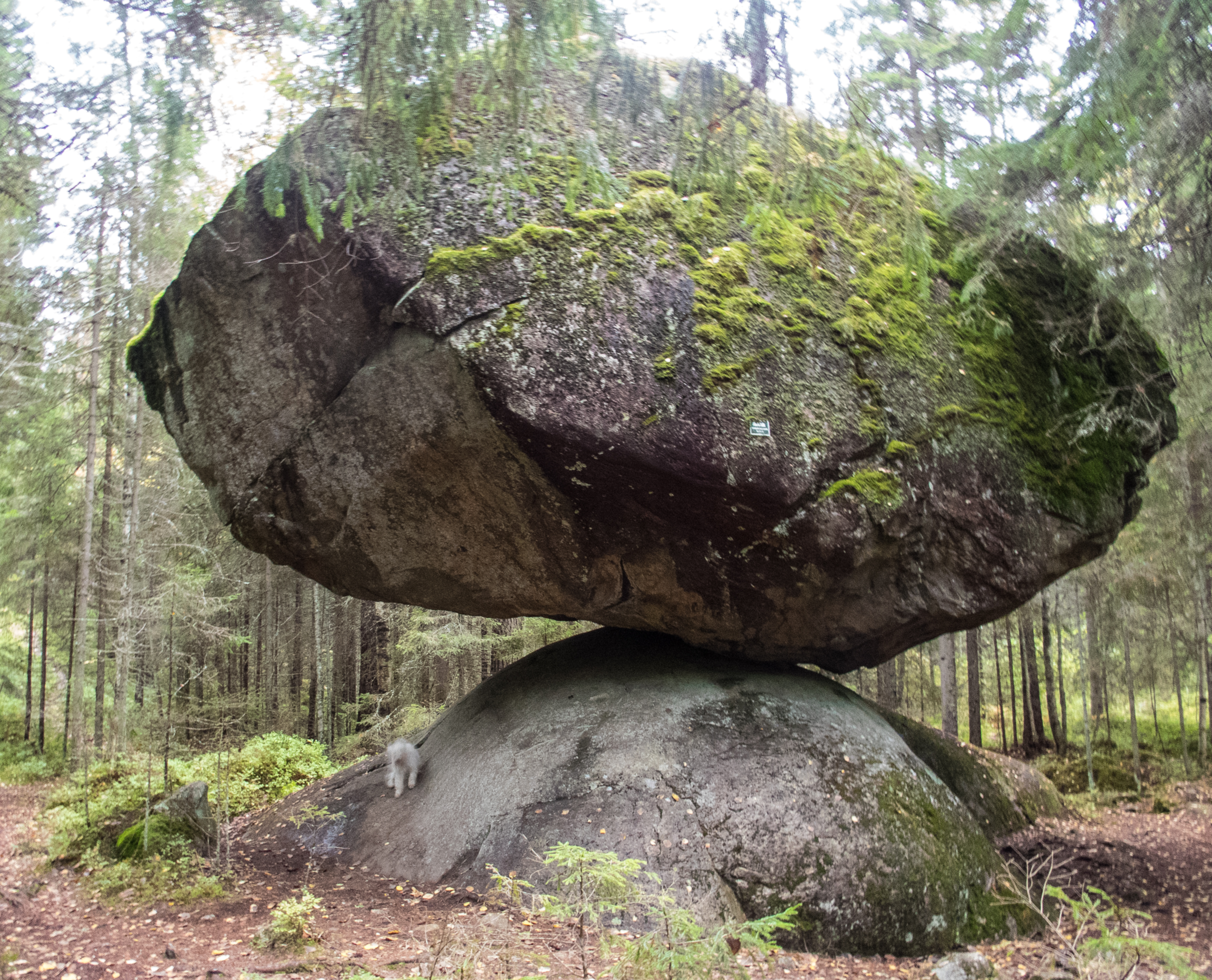
Kummakivi in September 2015.

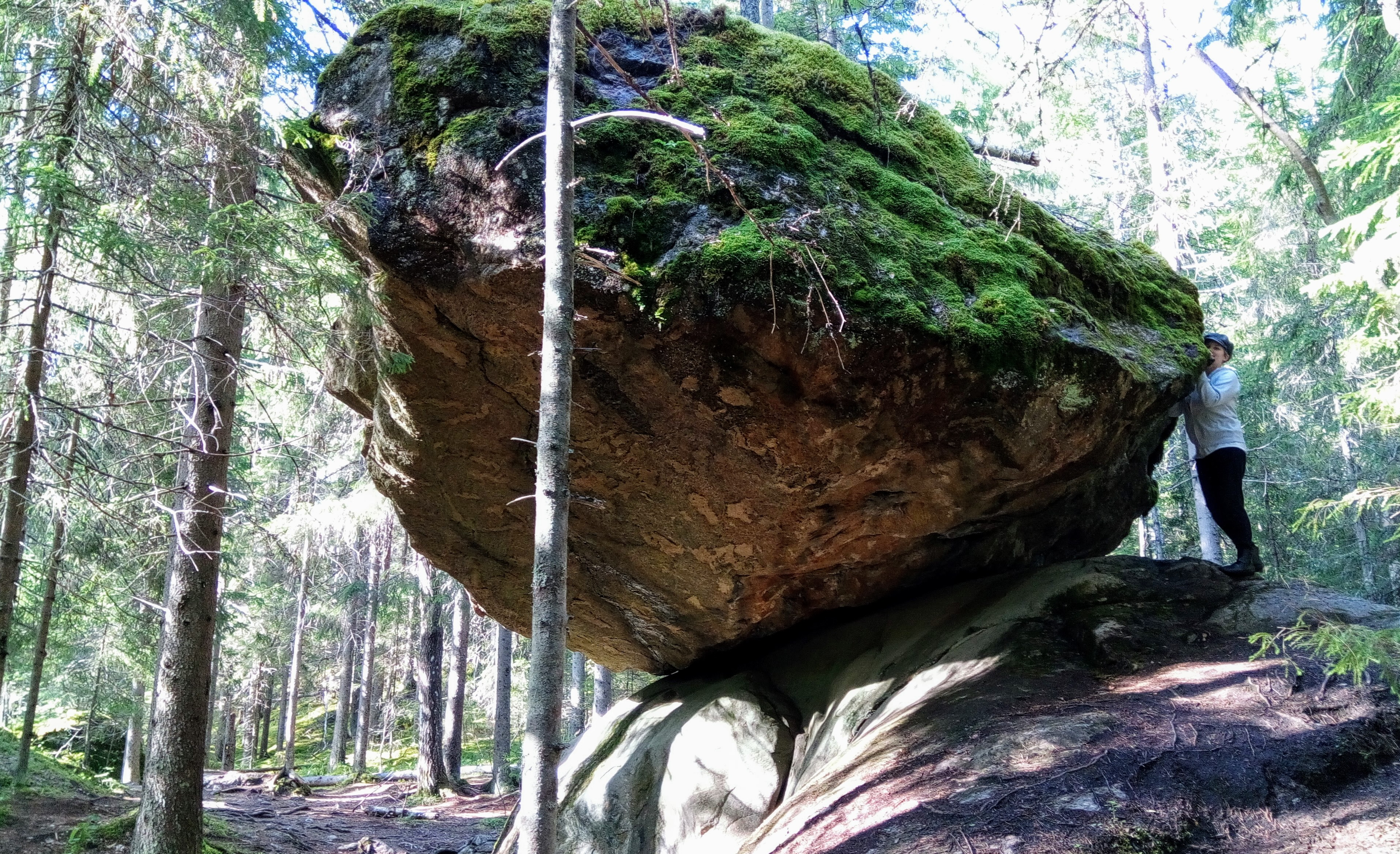
Another angle with person for scale

Kummakivi (lit. 'odd stone' or 'strange stone') is a large balancing rock in Ruokolahti, Finland. The 7-metre-long (23 ft) boulder is a glacial erratic that lies on a convex bedrock surface with such a small footprint that it almost appears to be moving, but so firmly that it cannot be rocked with human force.

The boulder is located in a forest in the western part of the Ruokolahti municipality, near the border of Puumala.

== See also ==
- List of individual rocks
