= Balancing rock =

Naturally occurring precariously balanced rock

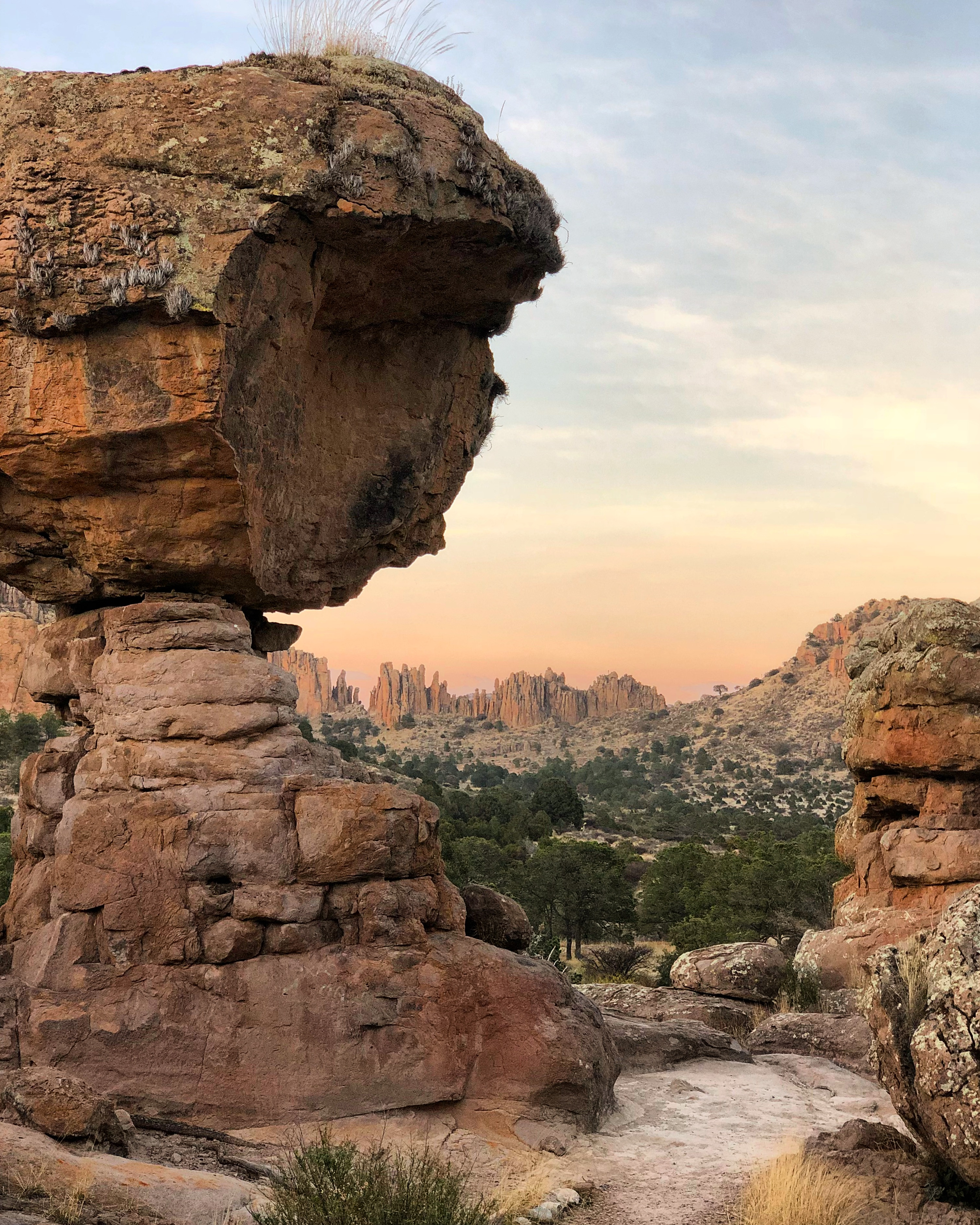
Sierra de Organos National Park, Mexico

A balancing rock, also called a balanced rock, precariously balanced rock (PBR), or precarious boulder, is a naturally occurring geological formation featuring a large rock or boulder, sometimes of substantial size, resting on other rocks, bedrock, or on glacial till. Some formations known by this name only appear to be balancing, but are in fact firmly connected to a base rock by a pedestal or stem.

No single scientific definition of the term exists, and it has been applied to a variety of rock features.

== Categories ==
Types of feature that the term has been applied to include:

Glacial erratic
A boulder that was transported and deposited by glaciers or ice rafts to a resting place on soil, on bedrock, or on other boulders. It usually has a different lithology from the other rocks around it. Not all glacial erratics are balancing rocks; some are firmly seated on the ground. Some balancing erratics have come to be known as rocking stones, also known as logan rocks, logan stones, or logans, because they are so finely balanced that the application of just a small force may cause them to rock or sway. A good example of a rocking stone is the Logan Rock in Cornwall, England, United Kingdom; another is the Trembling Rock in Brittany, France.
Perched block
Also known as a perched boulder or perched rock, this is a large, detached rock fragment that most commonly was transported and deposited by a glacier to a resting place on glacial till, often on the side of a hill or slope.Some perched blocks were not produced by glacial action, but were the aftermath of a rock fall, landslide, or avalanche.
Erosional remnant
A persisting rock formation that remains after extensive wind, water, and/or chemical erosion. To the untrained eye, it may appear to be visually like a glacial erratic, but instead of being transported and deposited, it was carved from the local bedrock. Many good examples of erosional remnants are seen in Karlu Karlu/Devils Marbles Conservation Reserve in the Northern Territory of Australia.
Pedestal rock
Also known as a rock pedestal or mushroom rock, this is not a true balancing rock, but is a single continuous rock form with a very small base leading up to a much larger crown. Some of these formations are called balancing rocks because of their appearance. The undercut base was attributed for many years to simple wind abrasion, but is now believed to result from a combination of wind and enhanced chemical weathering at the base where moisture would be retained longest. Some pedestal rocks sitting on taller spire formations are known as hoodoos.

== Notable balancing rocks ==
=== Africa ===
==== Zimbabwe ====
- The balancing rocks of Zimbabwe are a series of geological formations found in Zimbabwe. The Balancing Rocks of Epworth are famous for being featured on the nation's banknotes, including those issued during periods of hyperinflation, such as the Zimbabwean 100 trillion dollar note, one of the highest denomination banknotes ever issued.
- The Mother and Child balancing rocks are a well-known feature in Matobo National Park.
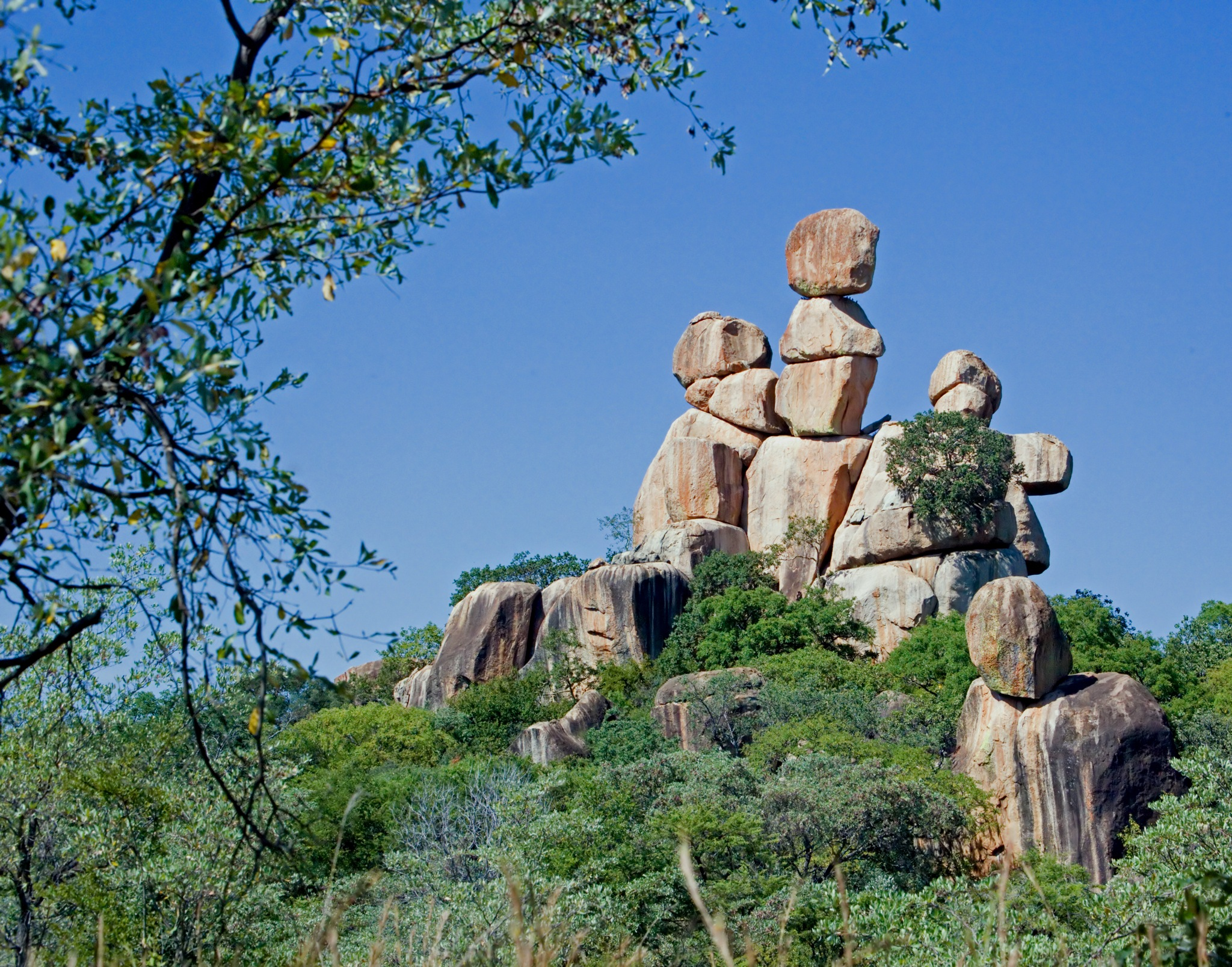
Mother and Child balancing rocks, Matobo National Park, Zimbabwe

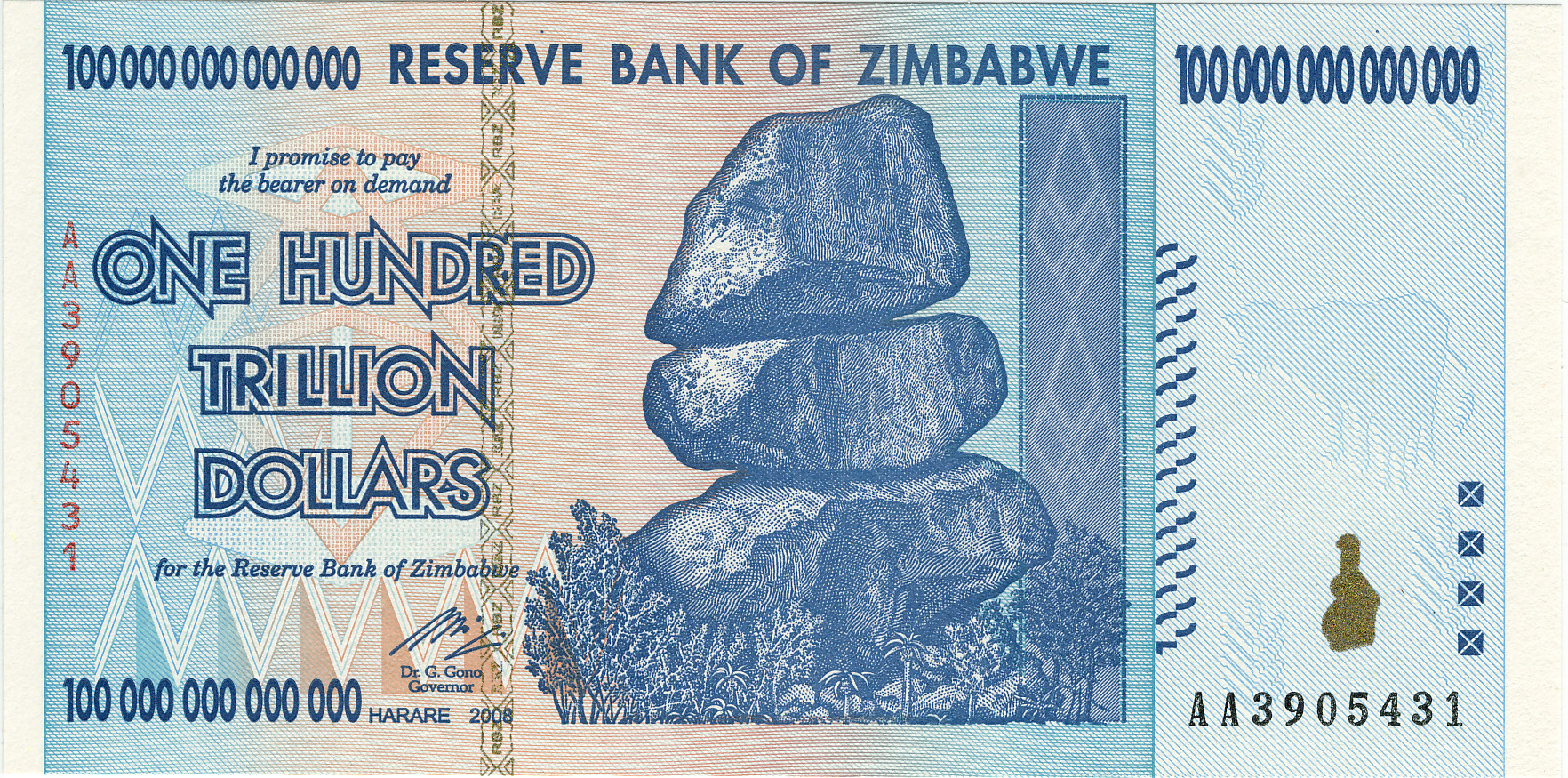
The Balancing Rocks of Epworth on the Zimbabwe $100 trillion note

=== Asia and Australia ===
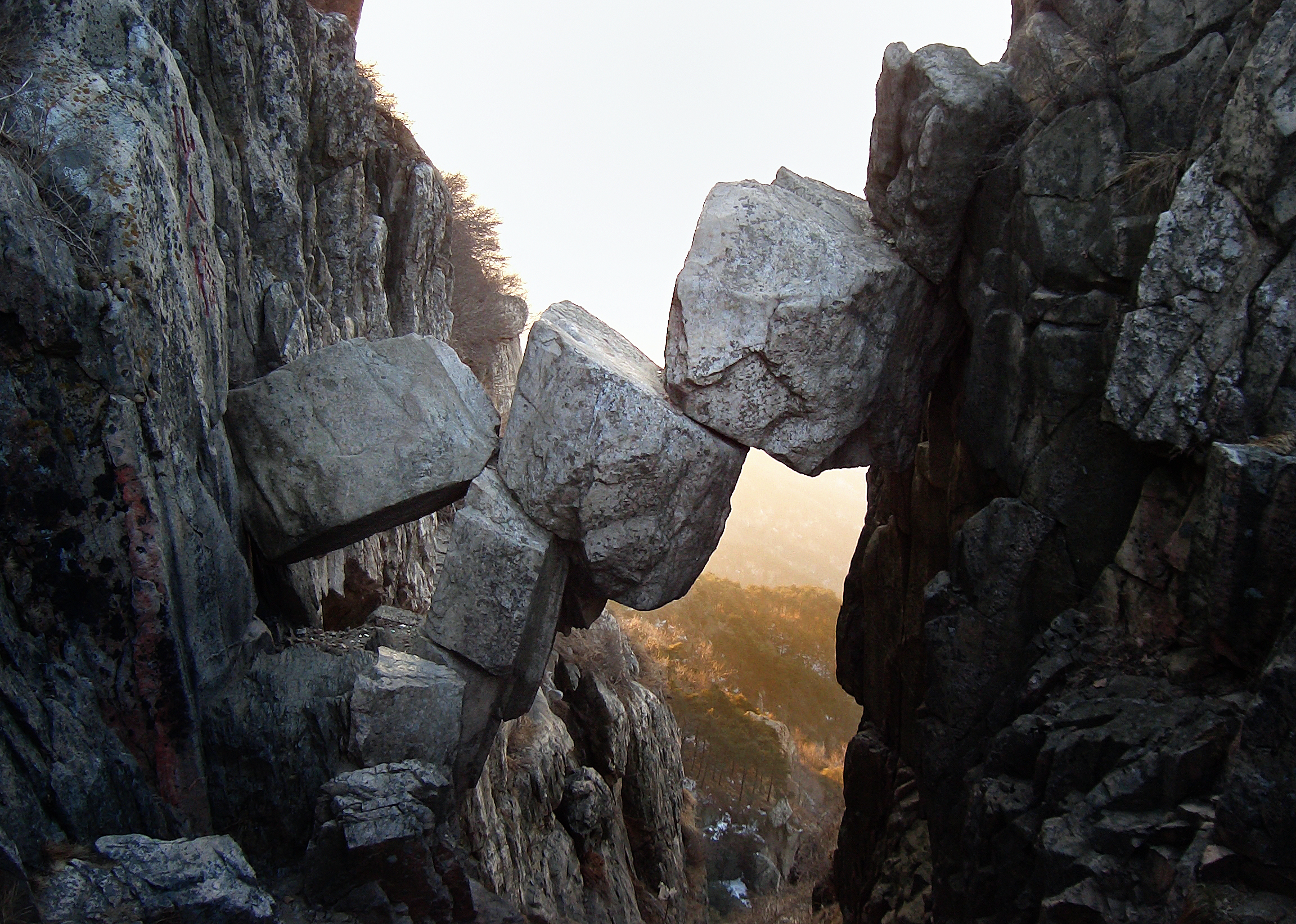
The Immortal Bridge, China

==== Australia ====
- Karlu Karlu/Devils Marbles Conservation Reserve is a vast field of erosional remnants.

==== India ====
- Krishna's Butterball is a huge boulder located in Mahabalipuram of Tamilnadu in India. It is situated on a steep rock surface. It is a local tourist attraction.
- The Balancing Rock of Mawlynnong is near the village of Mawlynnong in the East Khasi Hills district of Meghalaya. It is known as Maw Ryngkew Sharatia and is a tourist attraction.
- The Balancing Rock at Appukal village, Vellore district at Tamilnadu. This formation shows marked resemblance the balancing rock formation present in Zimbabwe. This rock formation appears like a bird and a baby alligator from specific angles.
- A balancing rock is located near Madan Mahal fort in Jabalpur city of Madhya Pradesh.
- A balancing rock, popularly known as Mama Bhagne, is situated in Dubrajpur on the Chota Nagpur Plateau in the state of West Bengal.
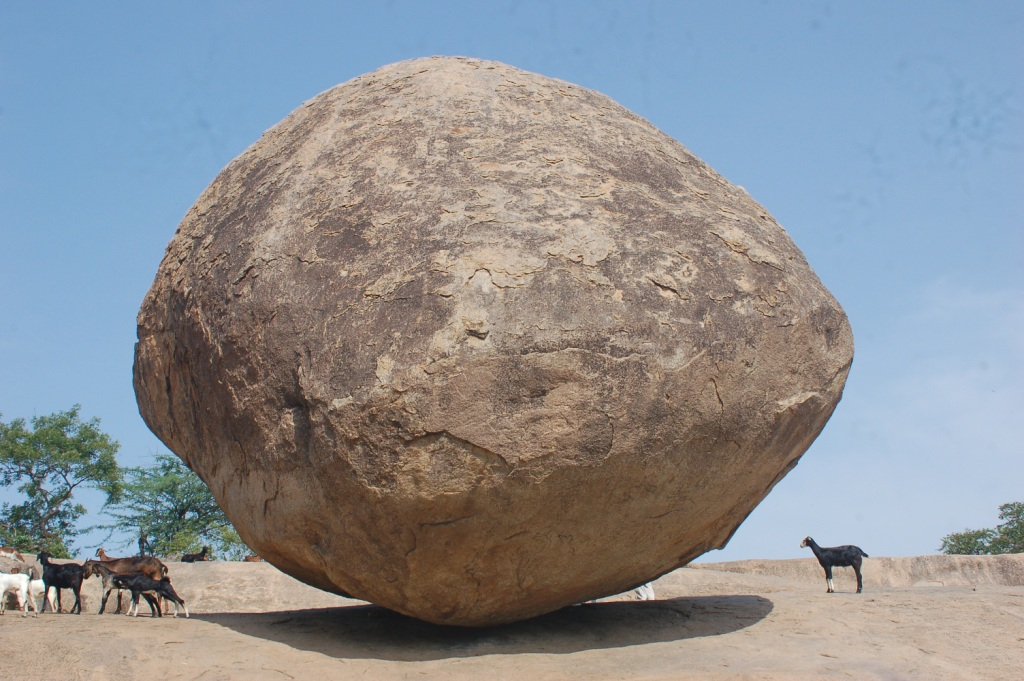
Krishna's Butterball in Mahabalipuram, India

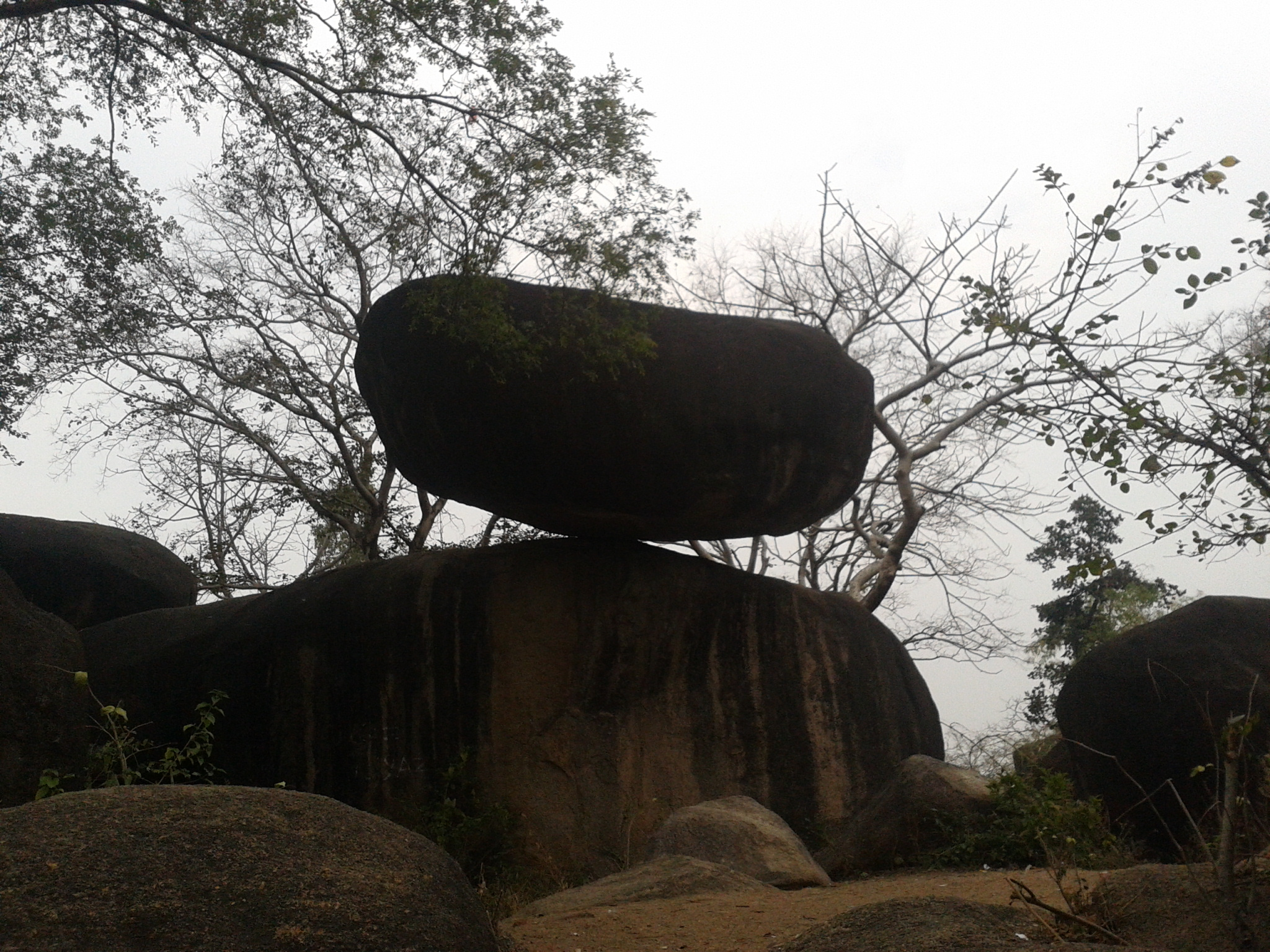
Balancing rock near Madan Mahal Fort, Jabalpur, Madhya Pradesh, India

==== Myanmar ====
- The boulder, which gleams golden and popularly known as the Golden Rock on which the small Kyaiktiyo Pagoda has been built, is about 25 ft (7.6 m) in height and has a circumference of 50 ft (15 m). The boulder sits on a natural rock platform that appears to have been naturally formed to act as the base to build the pagoda.

==== Philippines ====
- The Magpupungko limestone rock formation in Pilar, Siargao, which is also famous for its tide pools. The name "Magpupungko" means "the one who sits", from the root word pungkò ("to sit in a squatting position").
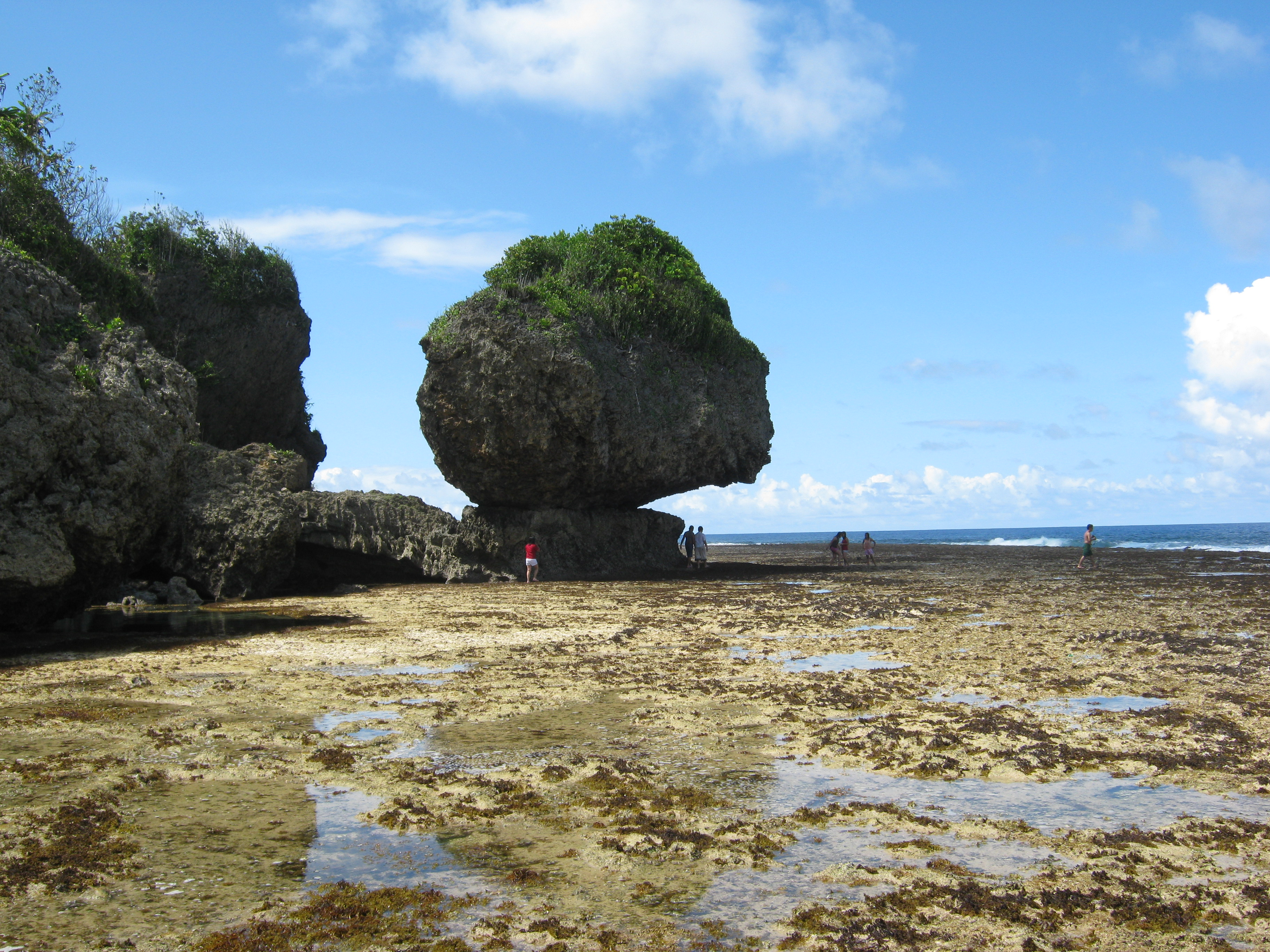
Magpupungko Rock in Pilar, Siargao, Philippines

==== Vietnam ====
- Hòn Đá Ba Chồng/Thị trấn Định Quán, Huyện Định Quán, Tỉnh Đồng Nai. Three rocks overlapping with a height of 36m, lying precariously right next to a highway.
- Hòn Chồng/Nha Trang, Tinh Khanh Hoa Rocks lay on top of each other next to the water's edge.

=== Europe ===
==== England ====
- The Brimham Rocks are a group of outstanding pedestal rock formations in North Yorkshire.

==== Finland ====
- Kummakivi is a balancing rock located in Ruokolahti.
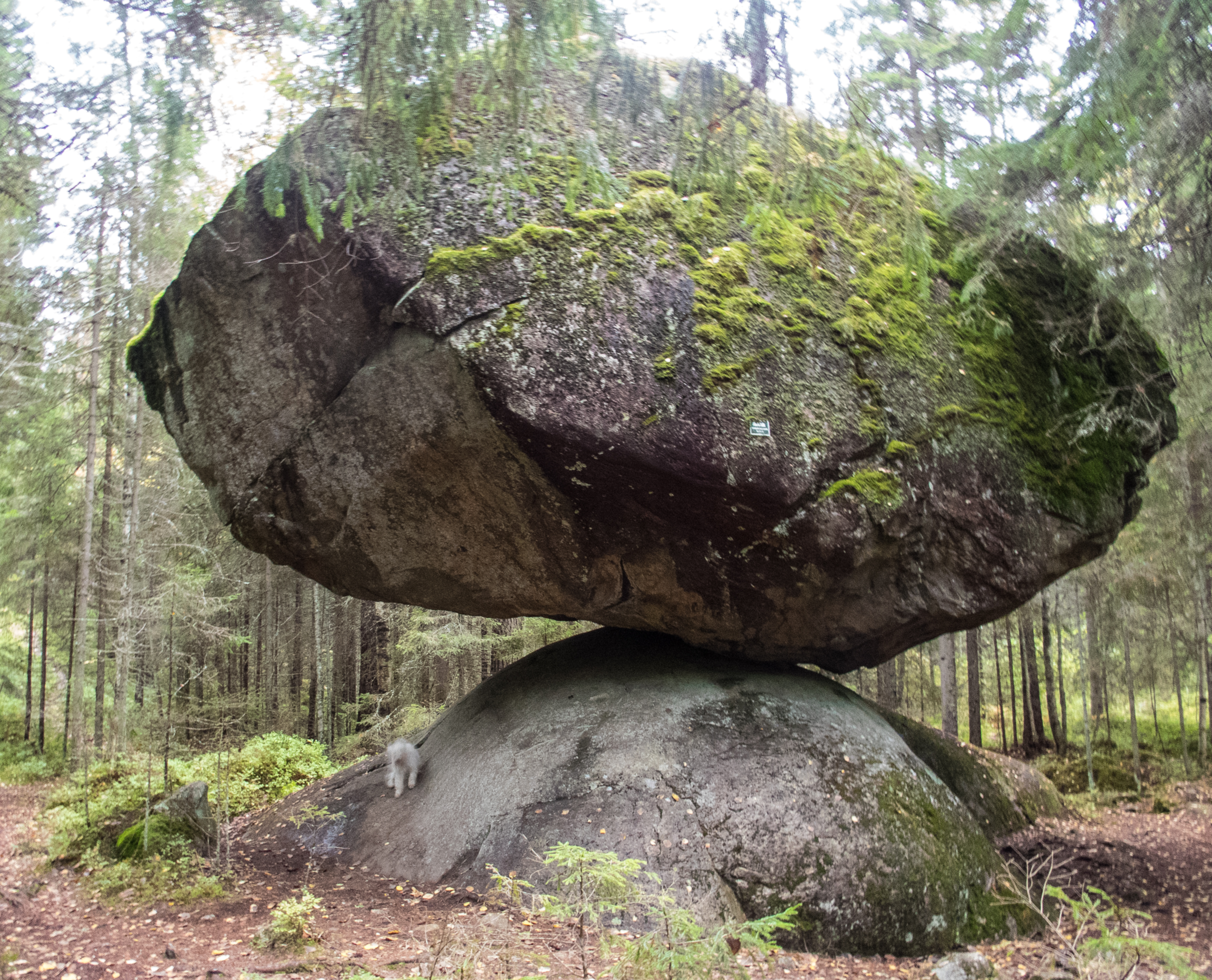
Kummakivi in Haukonsalo, Ruokolahti, Finland

==== Poland ====
- Chybotek – granite balancing rock in Giant Mountains
- Chybotek – granite balancing rock in Jizera Mountains.
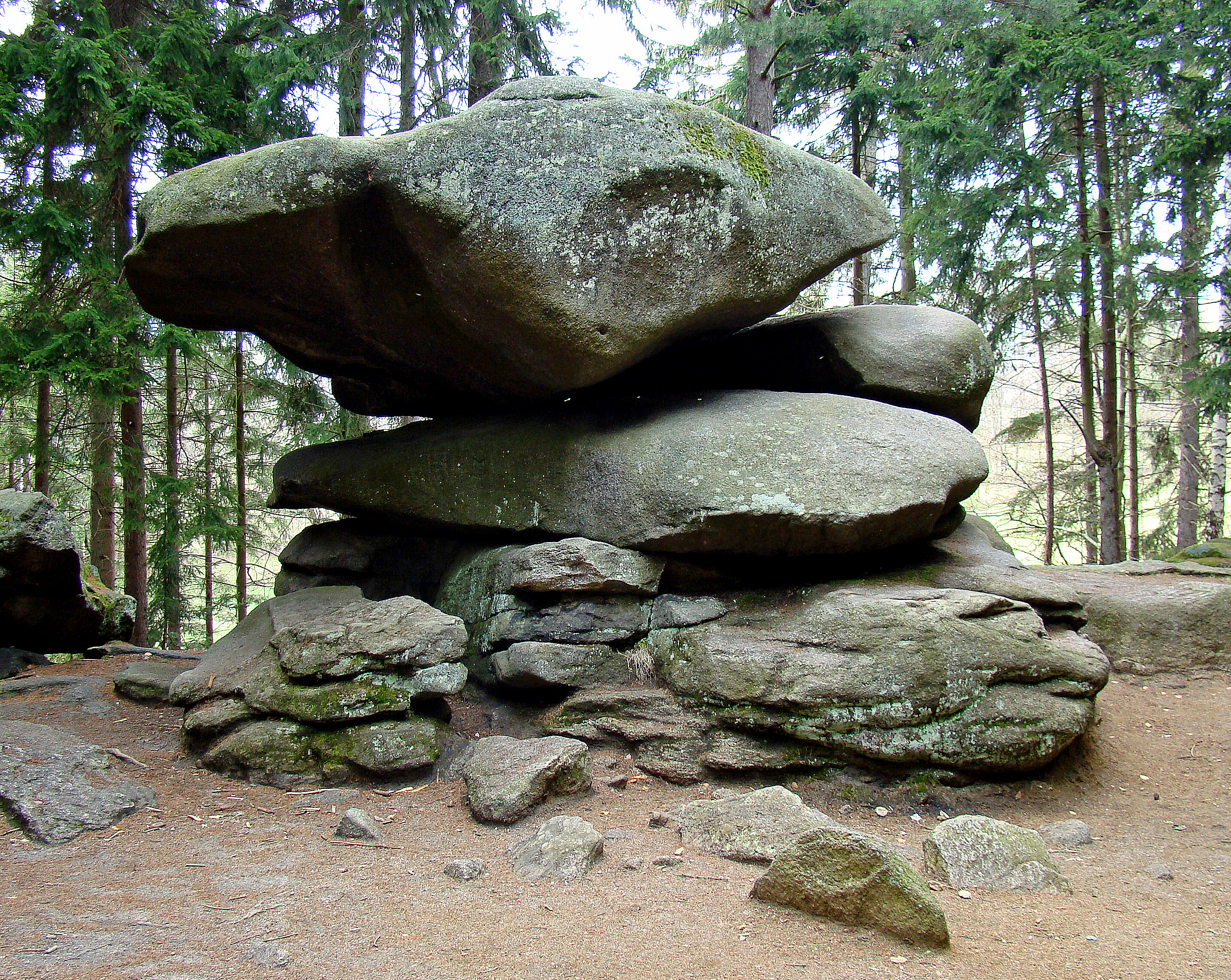
Chybotek, Giant Mountains, Poland

==== Spain ====
- Pedra de abalar – granite balancing rock in Muxía (Pedra da barca)
- El Tornillo (The Screw), El Torcal de Antequera, Antequera.
- Pena do Equilibrio – Giant granite balancing rock resulting from spheroidal weathering, located in Ponteareas (Pontevedra, NW Spain).
- El Tormo Alto, Ciudad Encantada, Cuenca.
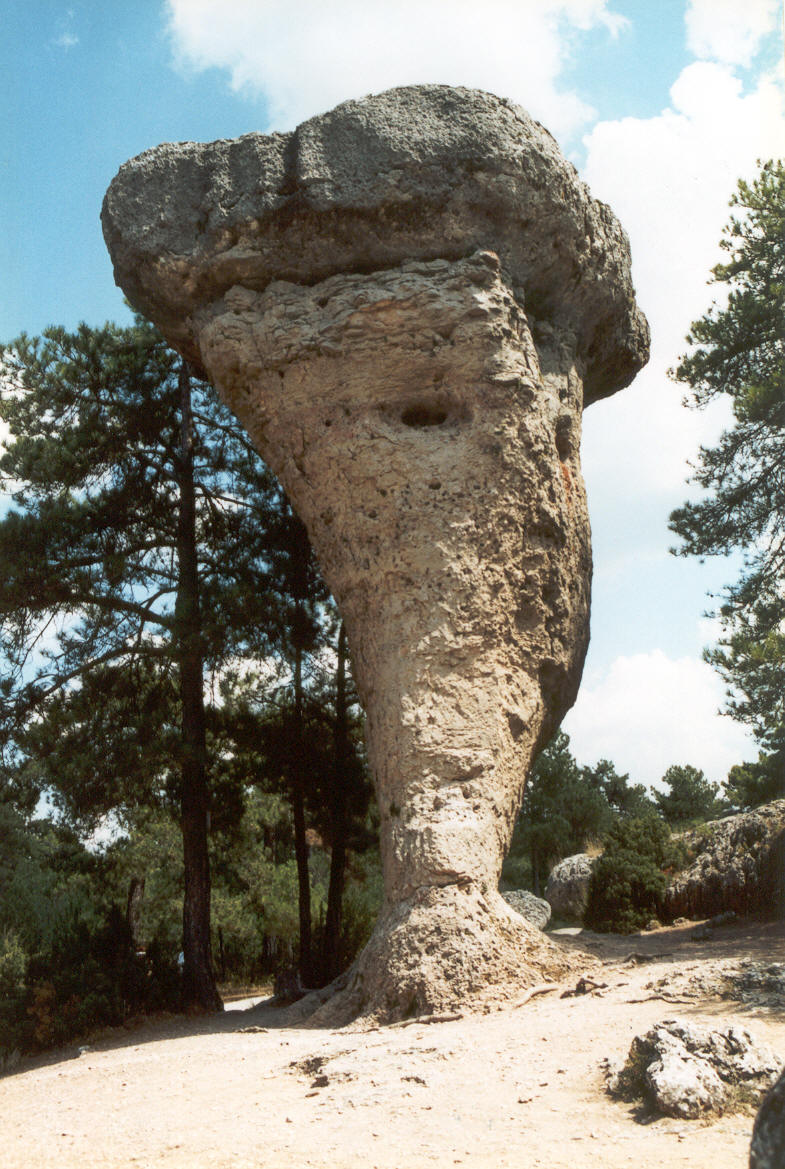
A mushroom rock, Ciudad Encantada

==== Norway ====
- Kjeragbolten, Norway

=== North America ===
==== Canada ====
- Nova Scotia

A tall basalt stack appears to balance precariously above the water near Digby, Nova Scotia.

- British Columbia

Located near Bear Beach on the Juan De Fuca Trail, this solid rock is perched upon eroded sandstone.

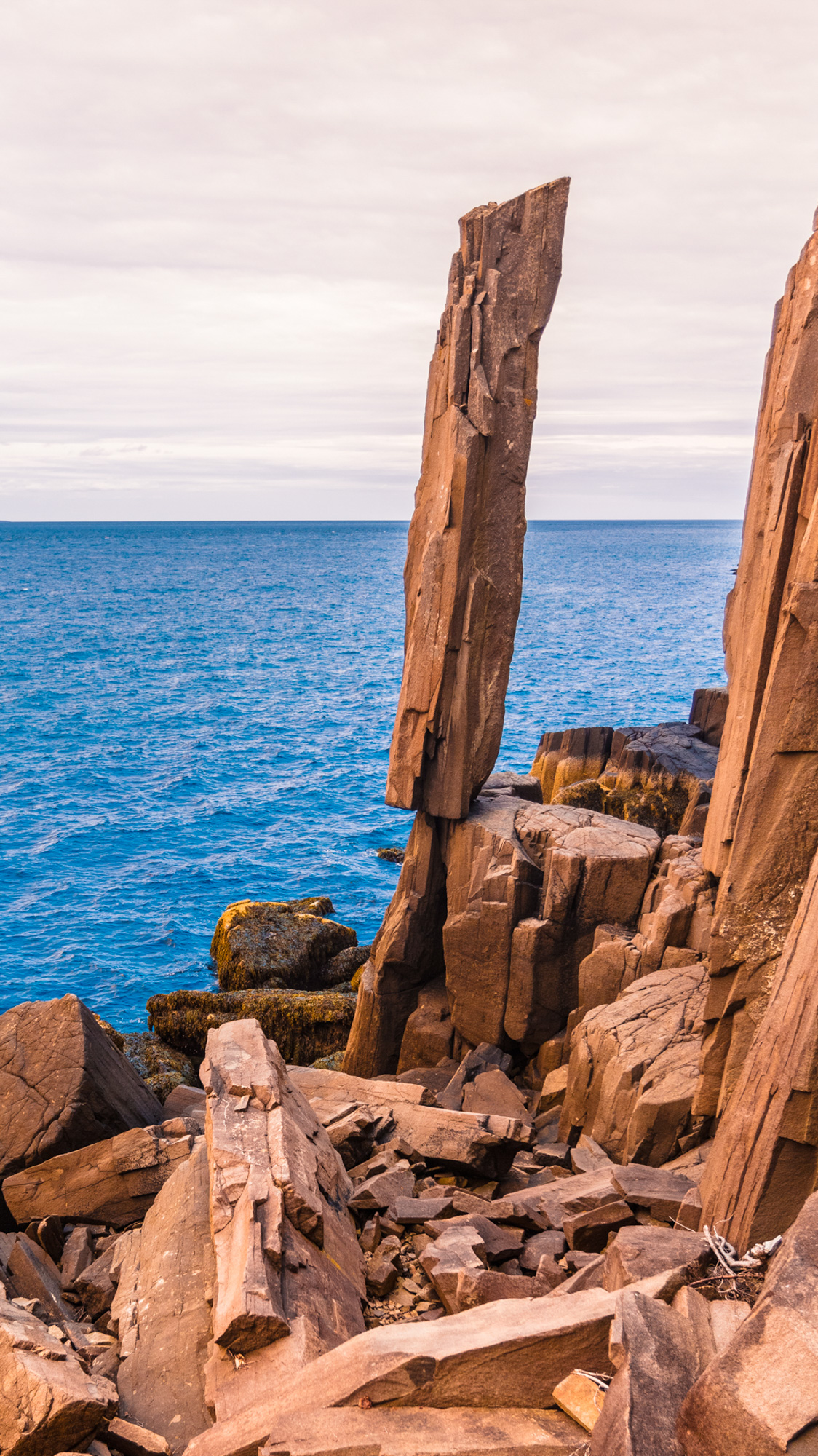
The Balancing Column near Digby, Long Island, Nova Scotia

==== United States ====
- Arizona

Several pedestal rocks are found within the boundaries of Chiricahua National Park, and two are easily accessible in Marble Canyon, between Navajo Bridge and Lee's Ferry.

- California

A large balancing rock may be easily seen at D.L. Bliss State Park on the west shore of Lake Tahoe.

- Colorado

A huge sandstone boulder hangs precariously near the roadway in Garden of the Gods park near Colorado Springs.

- Idaho

Balanced Rock is located south of Buhl in Salmon Falls Creek Canyon; created some 15 million years ago and comprising rhyolite lava, it stands 8 feet (2.4 m) tall, weighs 30 tons (27.215 metric tons), and is perched on a 3 foot by 17 inch (0.395 m^{2}) pedestal.

- Maine

A glacial erratic rests on the edge of a precipice on a mountain in Acadia National Park.
Balance Rock, a boulder beside the Shore Path in downtown Bar Harbor.

- Massachusetts

In Balance Rock Park, in Pittsfield State Forest, a field of massive boulders left on a hillside by receding glaciers is crowned by Balance Rock, a tremendous rock balancing almost unbelievably upon a smaller rock protruding from the ground.

- Oregon

A site near Lake Billy Chinook is known as Balancing Rocks or as the Metolius Balancing Rocks.

- New Mexico

Several sites around the state, including the Bisti Badlands, Kasha-Katuwe Tent Rocks National Monument, the Ah-Shi-Sle-Pah Wilderness, Chaco Canyon National Park, Red Rock State Park, and in private and BLM public lands throughout New Mexico .

- New York

Balanced Rock in North Salem, in Westchester County, New York. A glacial erratic that rests securely on five other rocks pointing upright, the Balanced Rock itself is a heavily weathered pink granite that is not local to the area, and is in fact found further north in the Hudson Highlands.

- North Carolina

The Devil's Head is a large boulder perched on the ledge of a cliff in the Chimney Rock State Park, North Carolina.

- Texas

Balanced Rock (also called Window Rock) is a large boulder suspended between two pedestals in the Grapevine Hills of Big Bend National Park.

- Utah

One of the most visited formations in the United States is the Balanced Rock in Arches National Park.

- Washington

A large glacial erratic is at the south end of Omak Lake in Okanogan County, known as the Omak Rock.

- Wisconsin

Located in Devil's Lake State Park. A big rock near the top of a trail with the same name with a view on the lake.

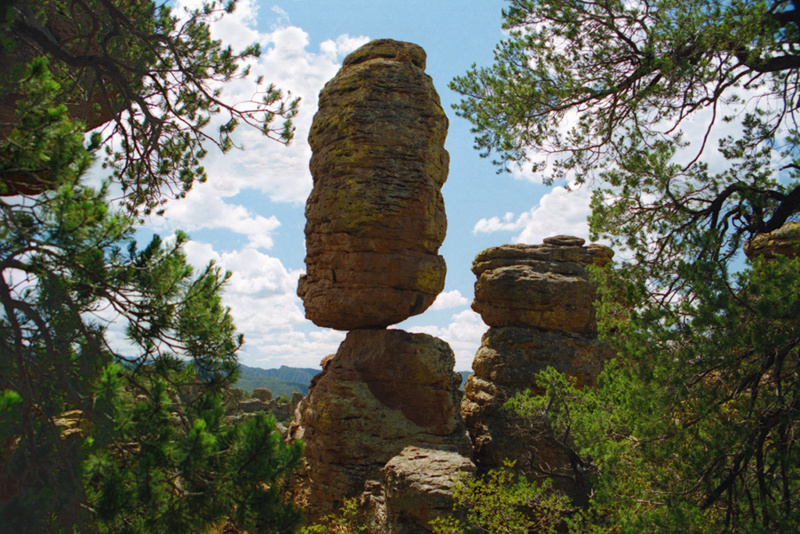
Pinnacle Balanced Rock, Chiricahua National Park, Arizona

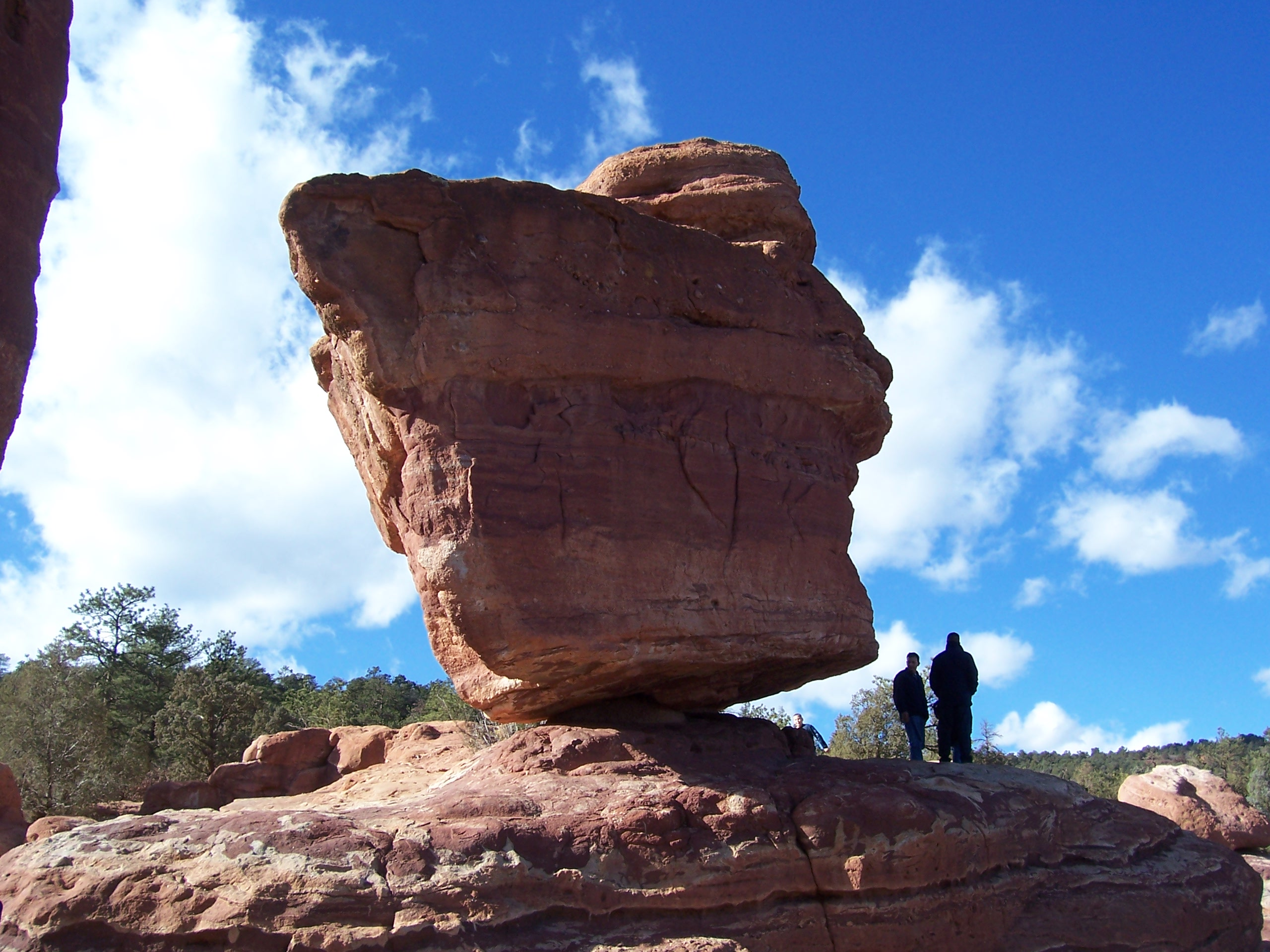
Garden of the Gods, Colorado Springs, Colorado

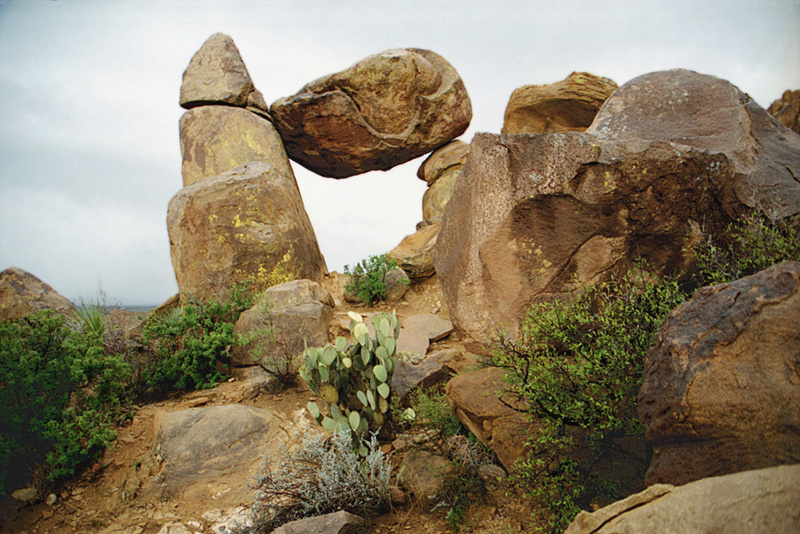
Balanced Rock, Big Bend National Park, Texas

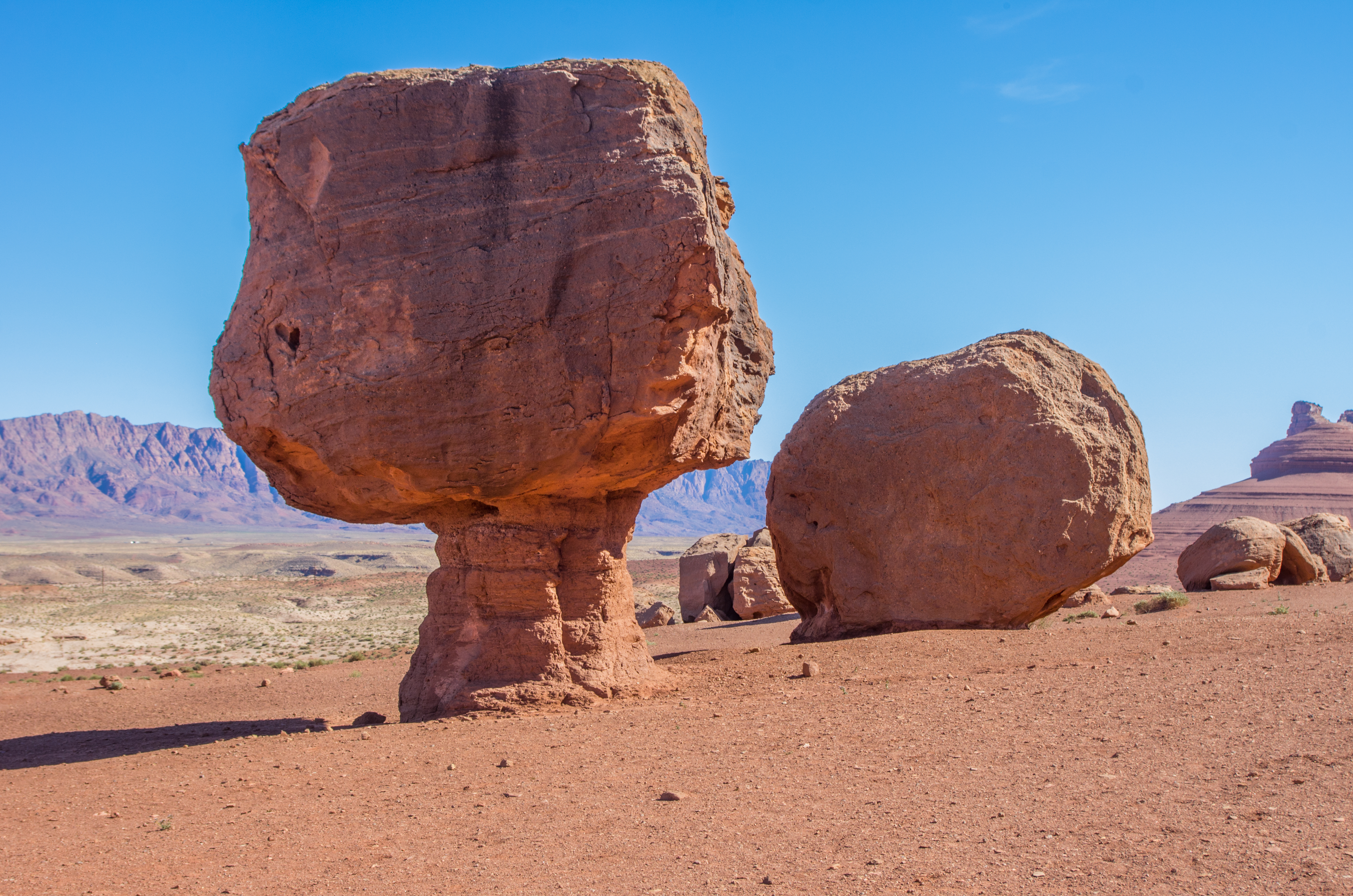
Balanced Rocks, Marble Canyon, Arizona

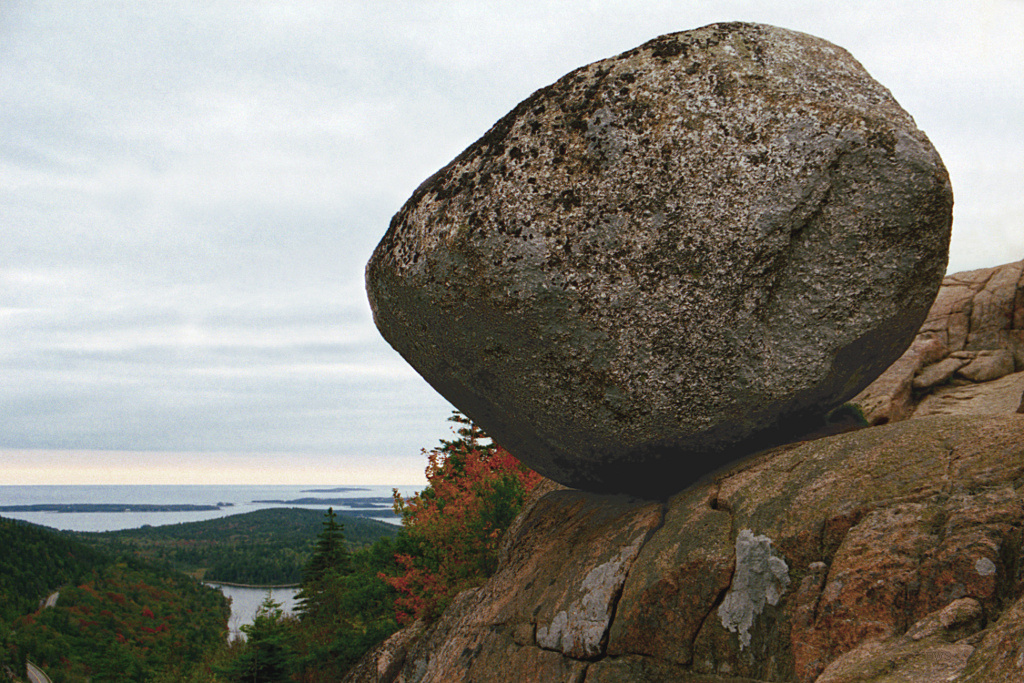
Bubble Rock, a glacial erratic in Acadia National Park, Maine

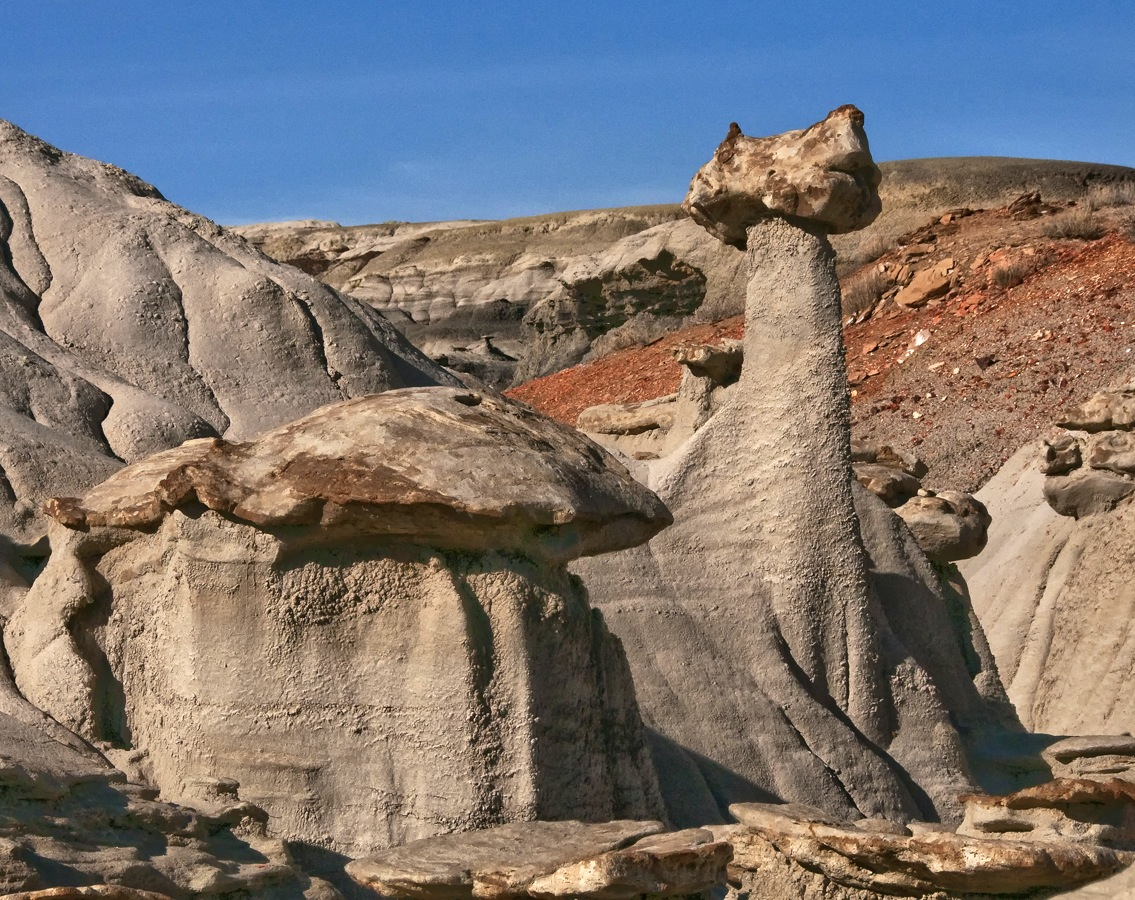
Balanced rocks atop the Sphinx in Bisti Badlands, Northwest New Mexico

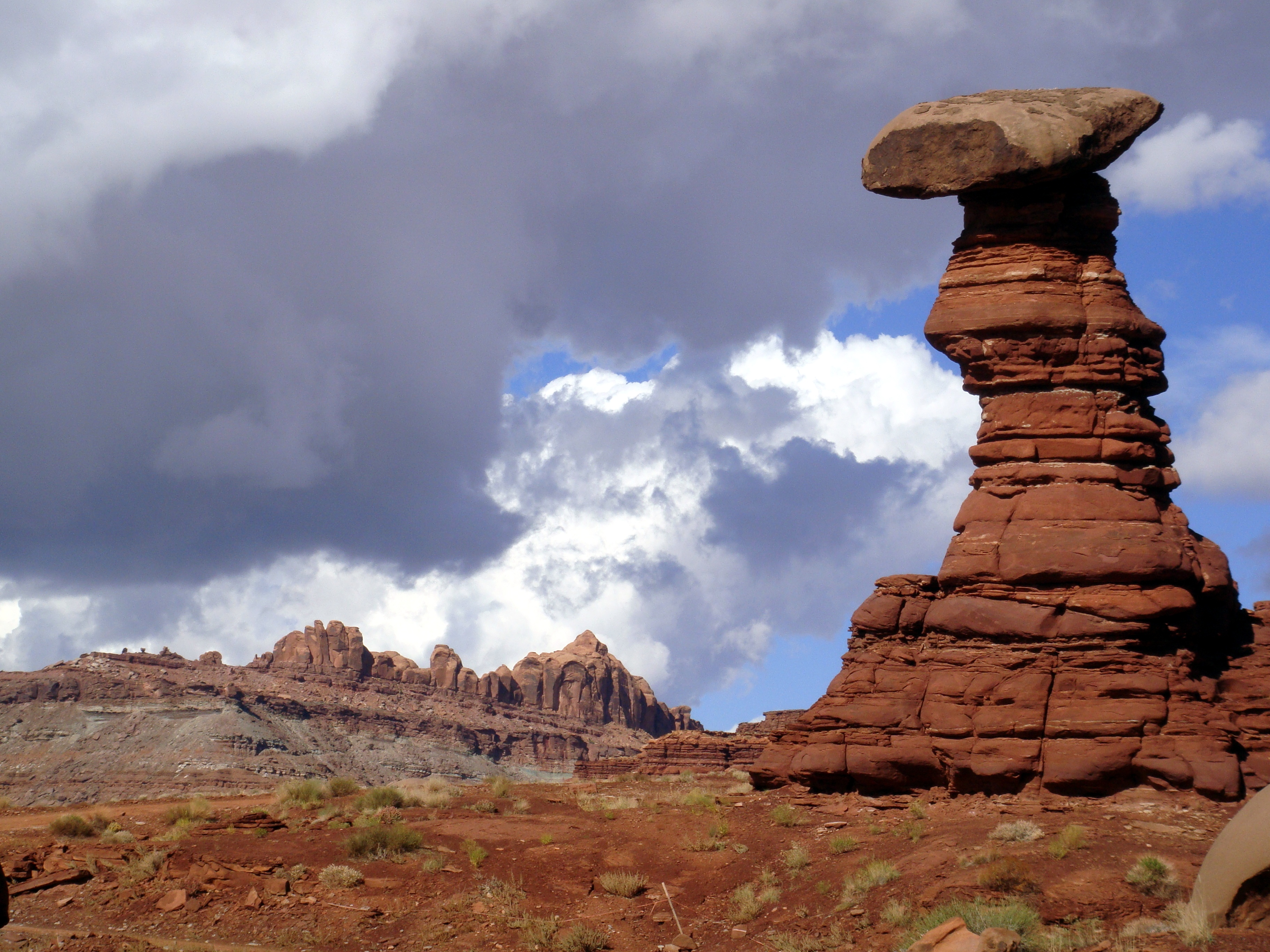
A pedestal rock, Chicken Corners trail, near Moab, Utah

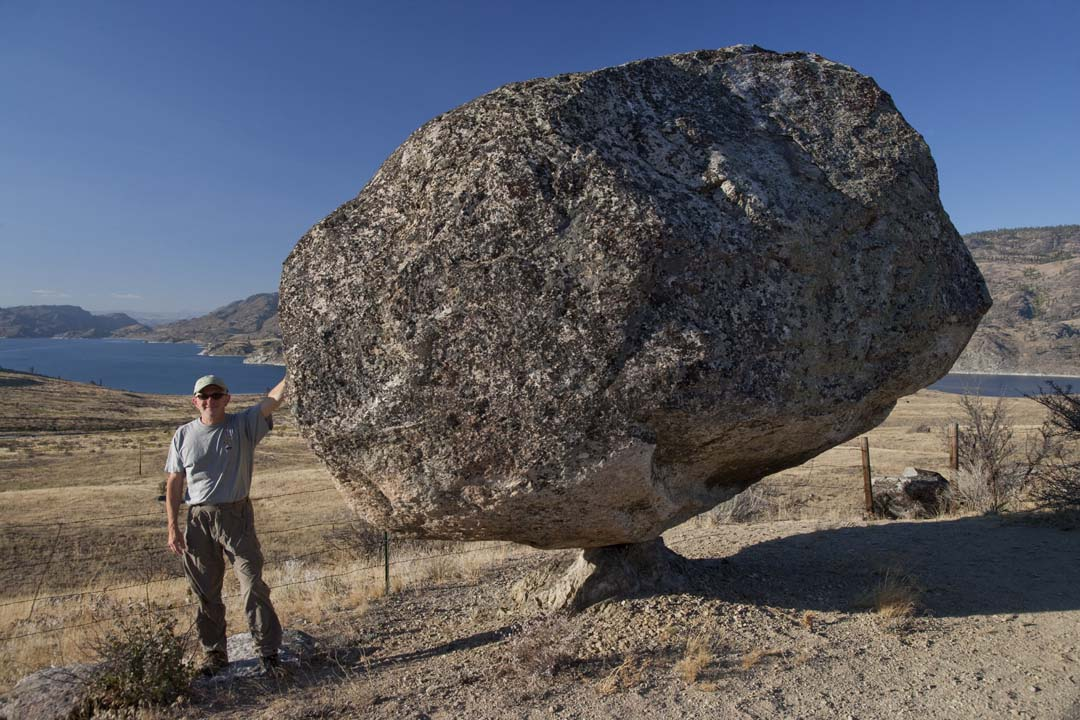
Omak Lake Balancing Rock, Washington

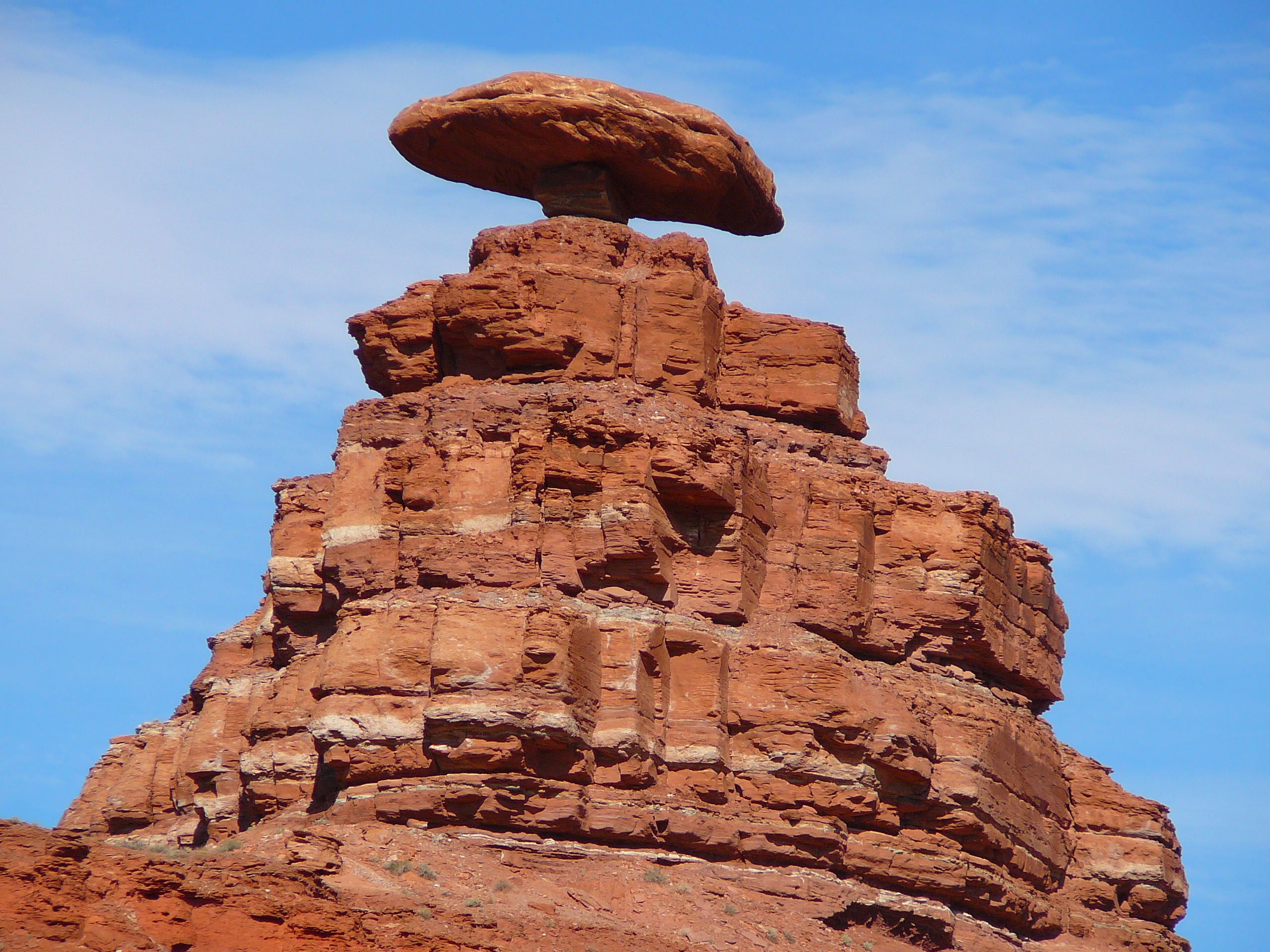
Mexican Hat Rock, near Mexican Hat, Utah

==== Mexico ====
- Zacatecas

At Sierra de Organos National Park in the municipality of Sombrerete there are two balancing rocks near each other.

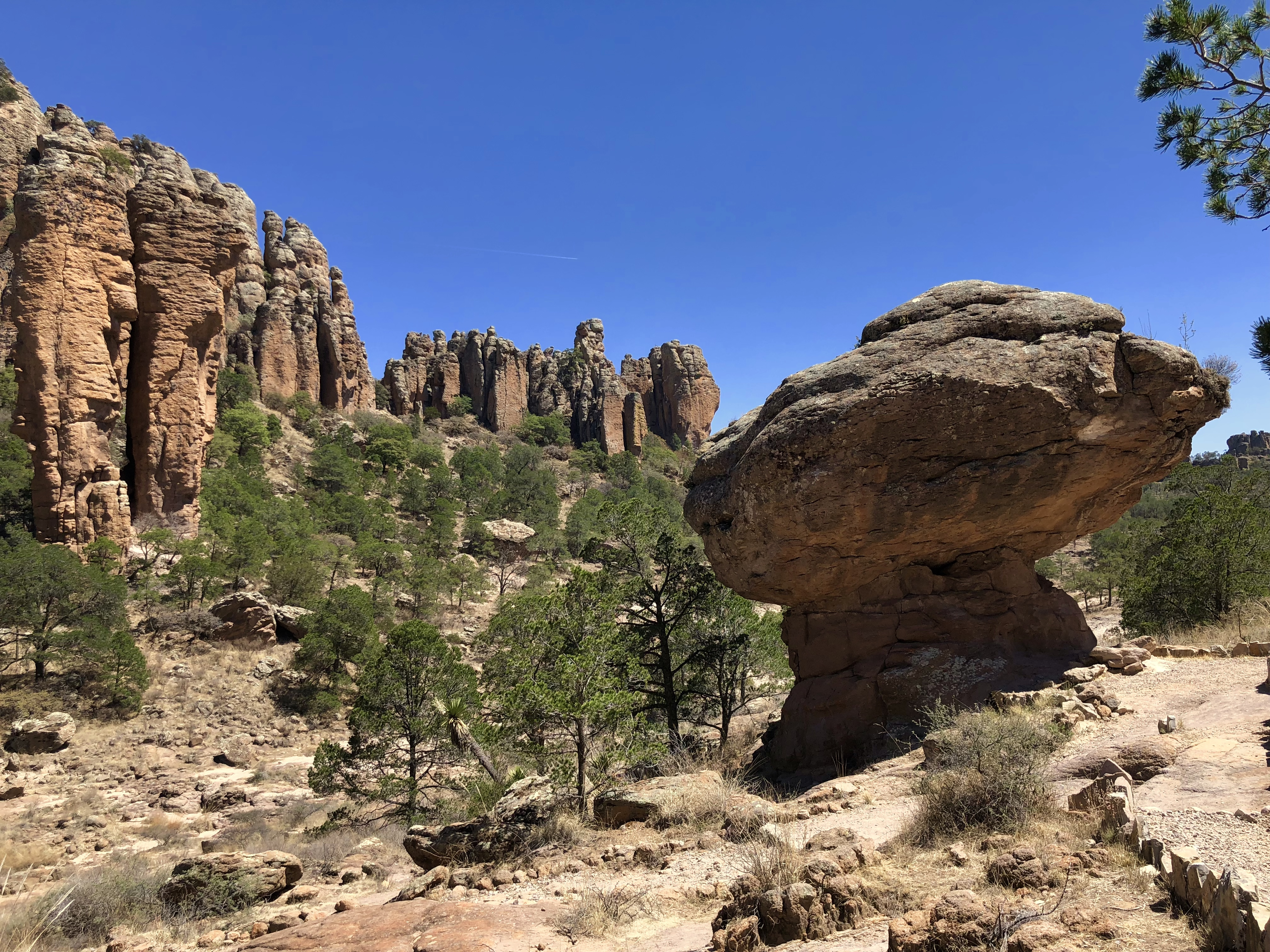
Sierra de Organos National Park in Mexico

=== South America ===
==== Argentina ====
- The Piedra Movediza was a balancing rock located close to the city of Tandil, Buenos Aires Province, Argentina. Its weight was about 300 tons, and its pedestal was so thin it moved with the wind. It attracted attention and tourists because of the way it was balanced on the edge of a cliff. The stone fell and broke on 29 February 1912, possibly due to human intervention. A replica of the stone was put in place in 2007.

== See also ==
- List of individual rocks
- Hoodoo
