= Ciudad Encantada =

Geological site in Castilla–La Mancha, Spain

- IUCN category III (natural monument or feature)
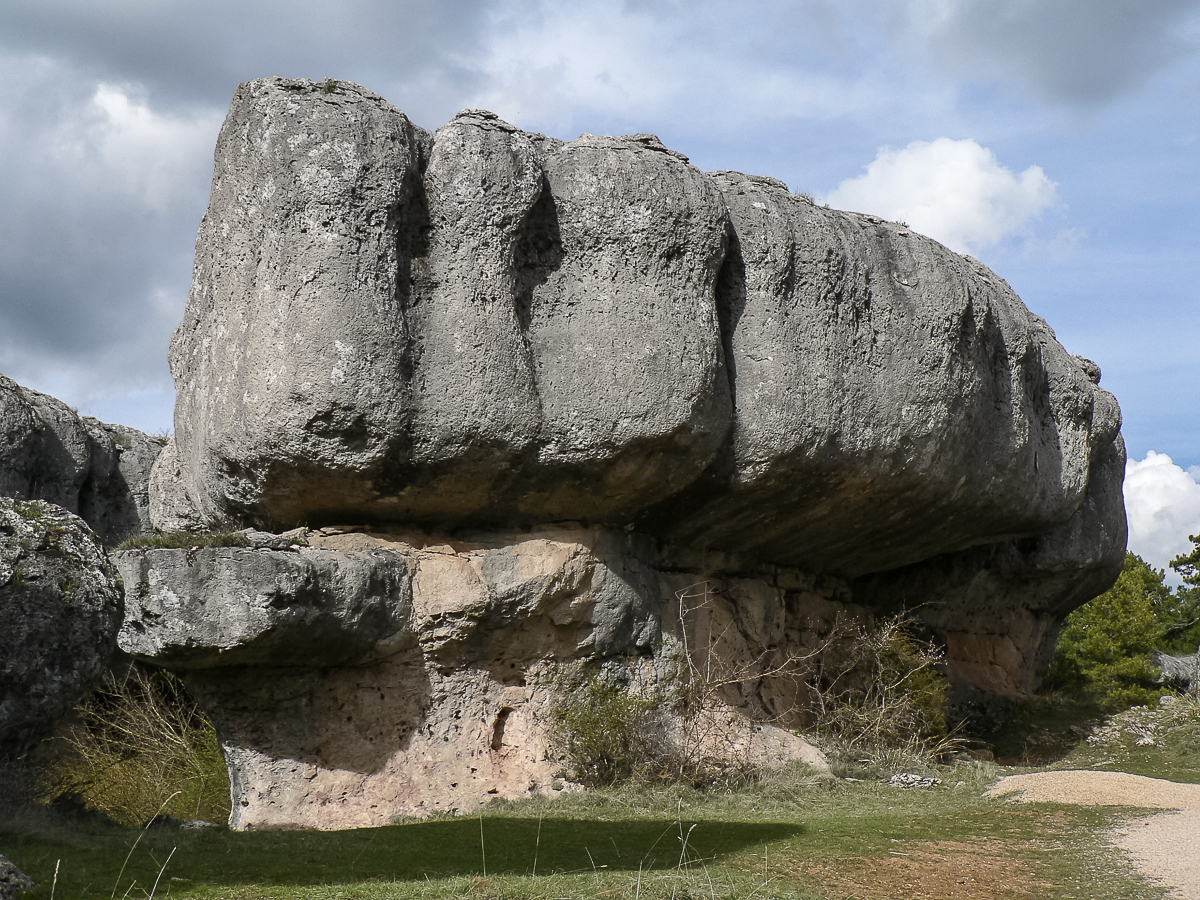
- Rock wall in Ciudad Encantada

- Location within Spain
- Location: Cuenca, Spain
- Coordinates: 40°12′29″N 2°0′35″W
- Area: 250 acres (100 ha)
- Established: 1929

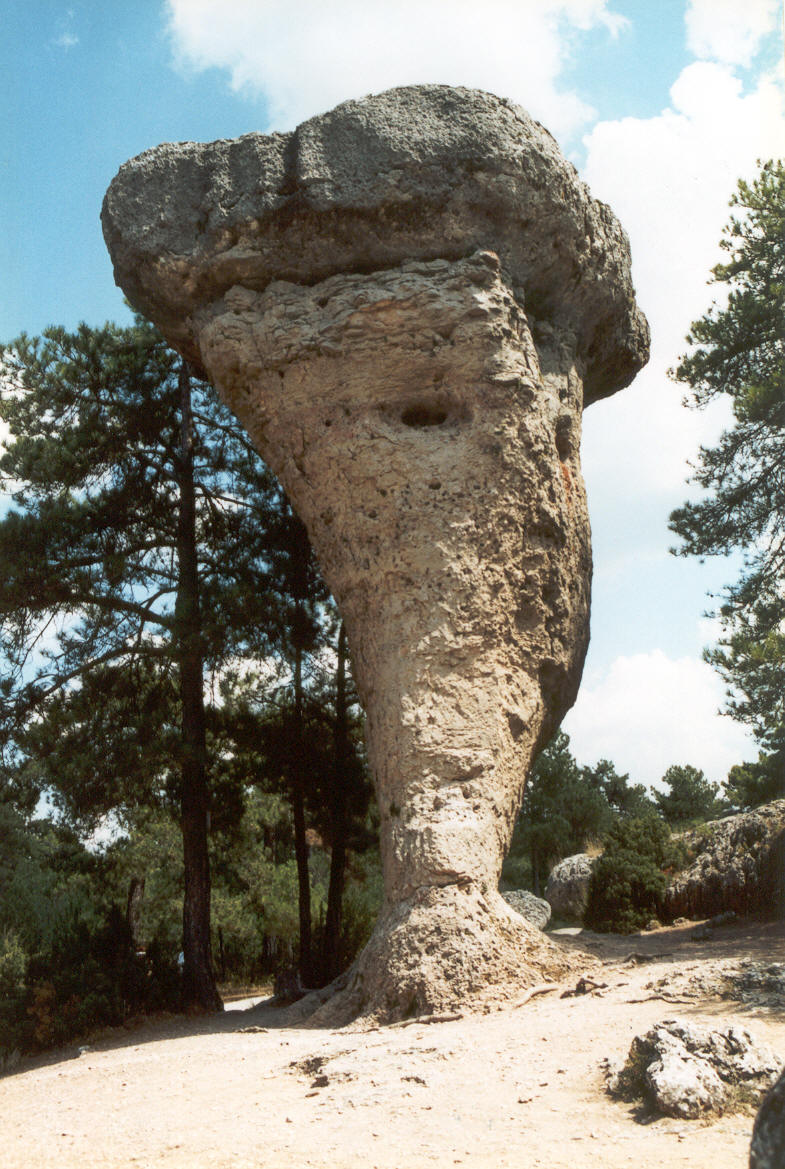
A mushroom rock, Ciudad Encantada.

The Ciudad Encantada (English: Enchanted City) is a geological site near the city of Cuenca, in the autonomous community of Castilla–La Mancha, Spain, in which the erosive forces of weather and the waters of the nearby Júcar river have formed rocks into distinctive and memorable shapes.

It was declared a Natural Site of National Interest on 11 June 1929.

== Origin of the formations ==
The rock formations of Ciudad Encantada are karst formations made of limestone and dolomite, which date back to the Cretaceous period, approximately 90 million years ago. Rain falling on the original limestone plateau wore down the porous limestone, leaving behind the more resistant dolomite. Because the dolomite was not always distributed evenly in the original rock, the result was the irregularly eroded shapes that form the Ciudad Encantada.

== Shapes of rocks ==
The rock formations that have been named include:

- Mushroom rocks Seta ('Mushroom')
- Puente ('Bridge')
- Cara ('Face')
- Convento ('Convent')
- El mar de piedra (The stone sea)
- Teatro ('Theatre')
- Hipopótamos ('Hippopotami')
- Amantes ('Lovers')
- La foca (The seal)
- La tortuga (the turtle)
- Los osos (the bears)

== In film and television ==
Ciudad Encantada appears as a location in the following films:

- The Pride and the Passion, 1957
- The Colossus of Rhodes, 1962
- The Mercenary, 1968.
- Johnny Hamlet, 1968.
- The Valley of Gwangi, 1969.
- Conan the Barbarian, 1982.
- The World Is Not Enough, 1999.

== Gallery ==
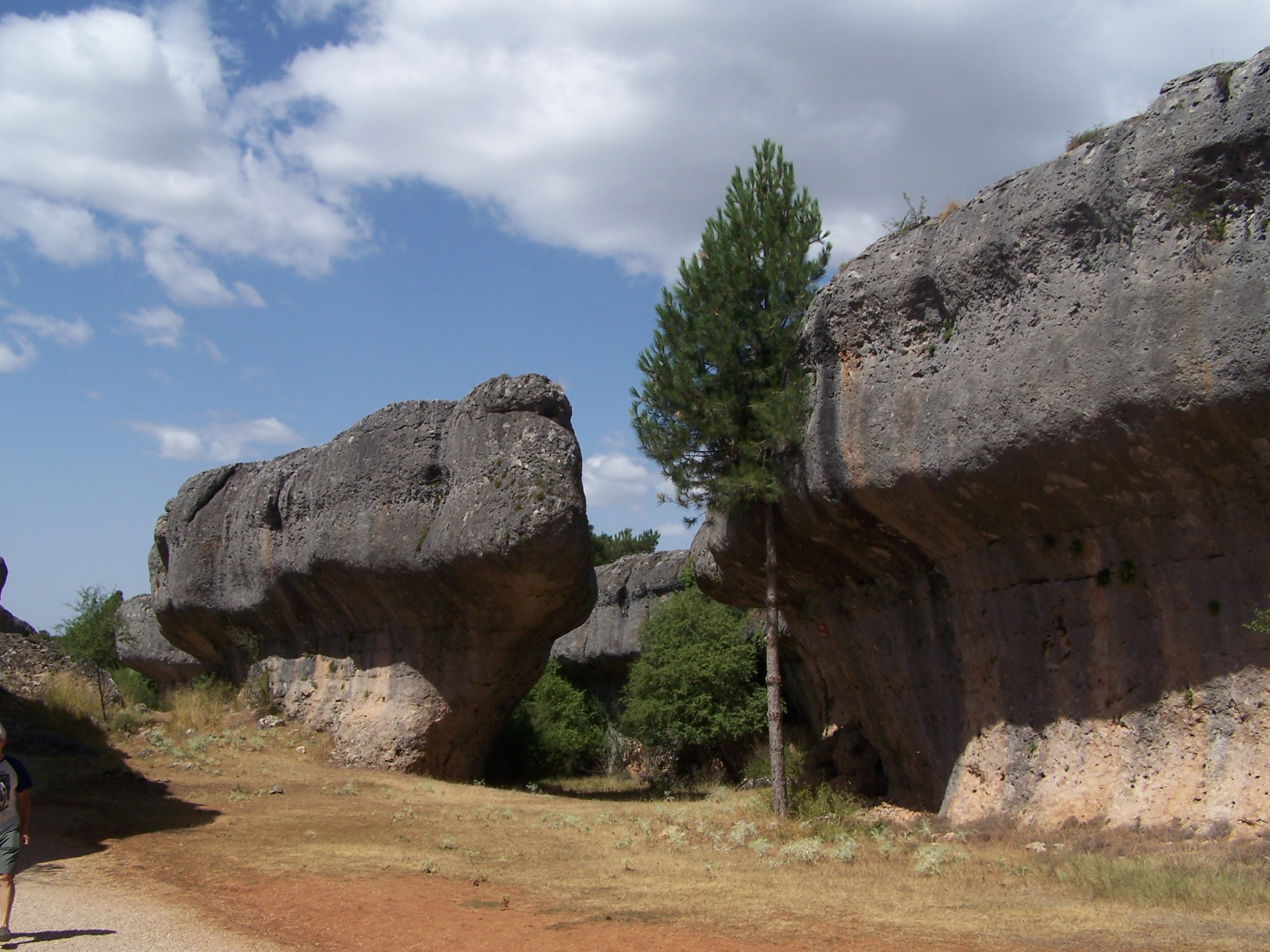
Rock walls

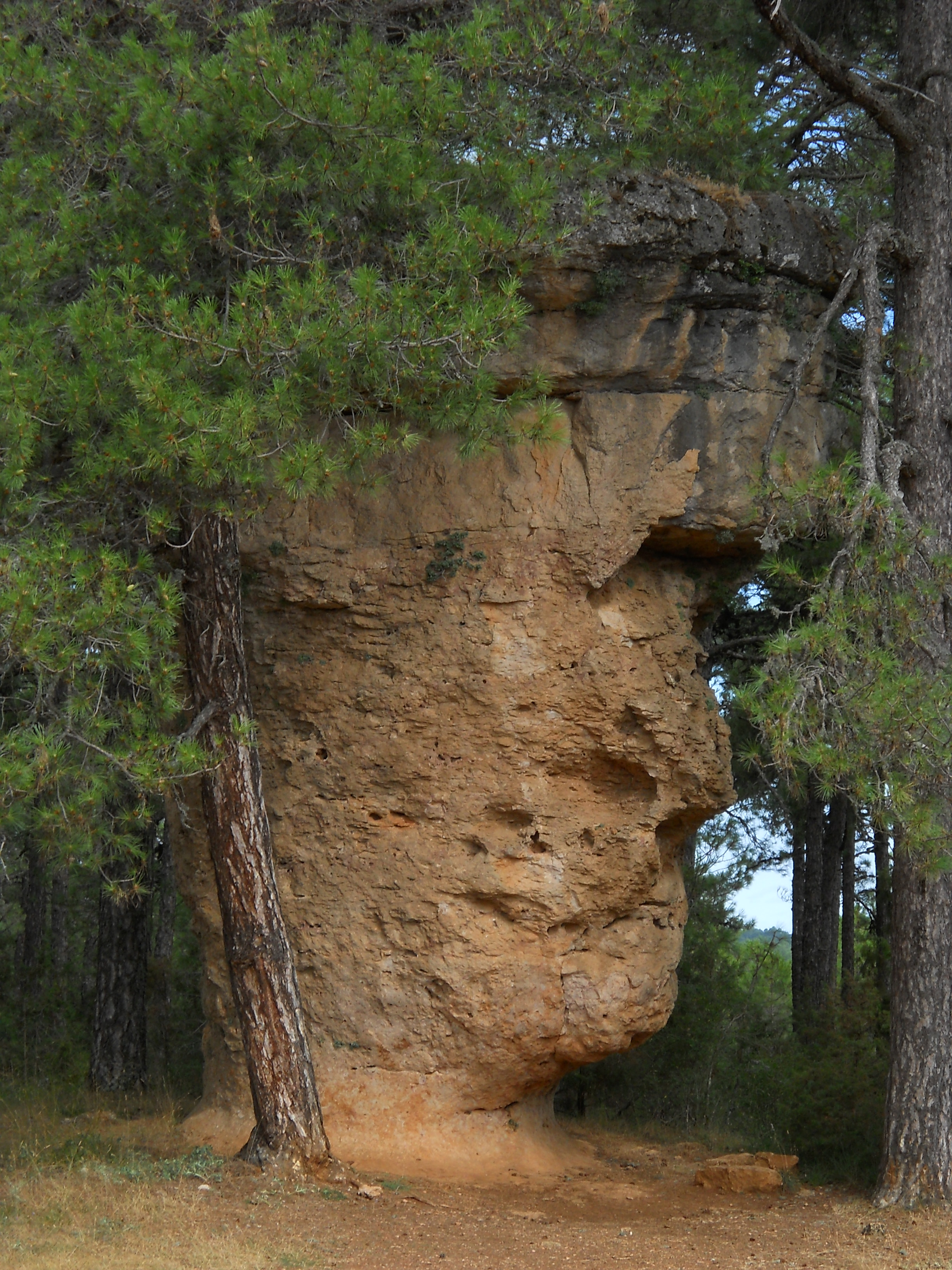
Man's face

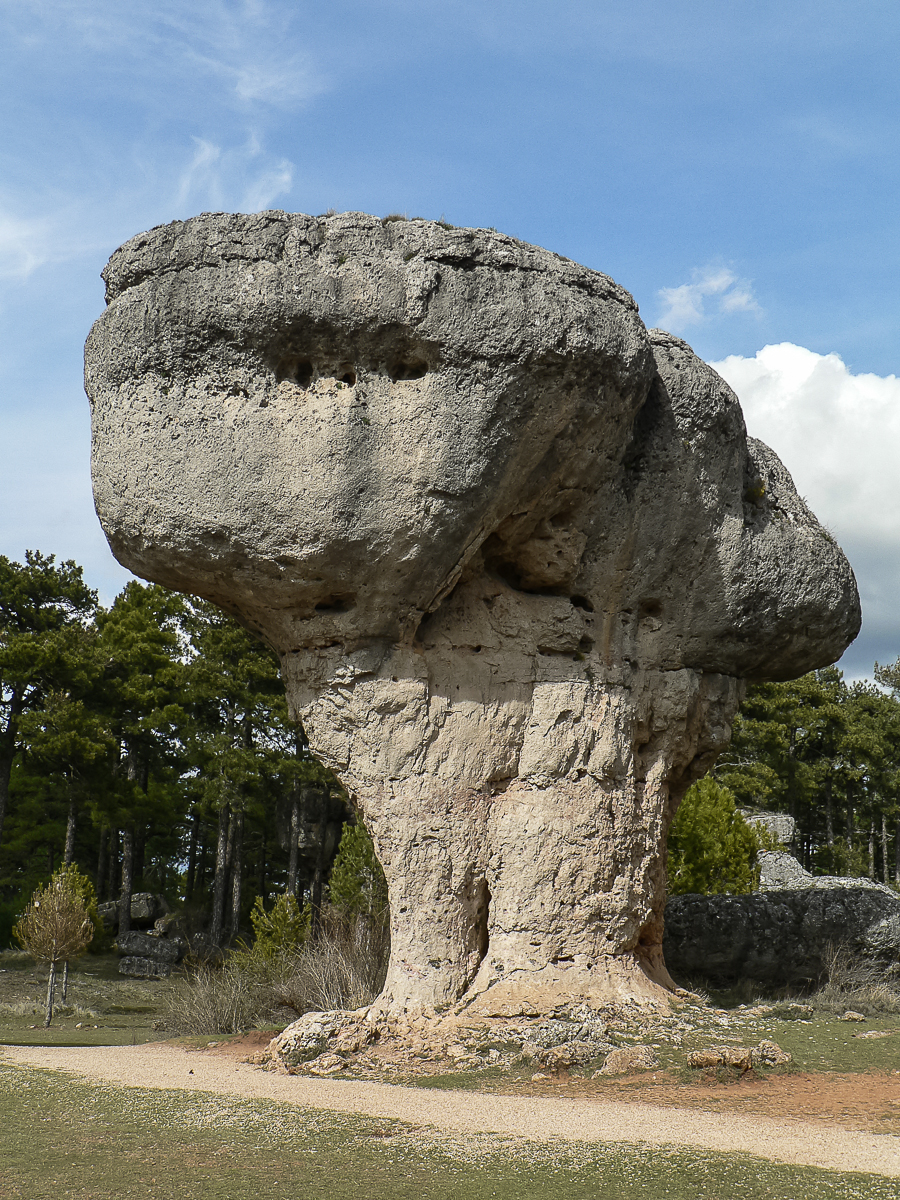
Other mushroom rock

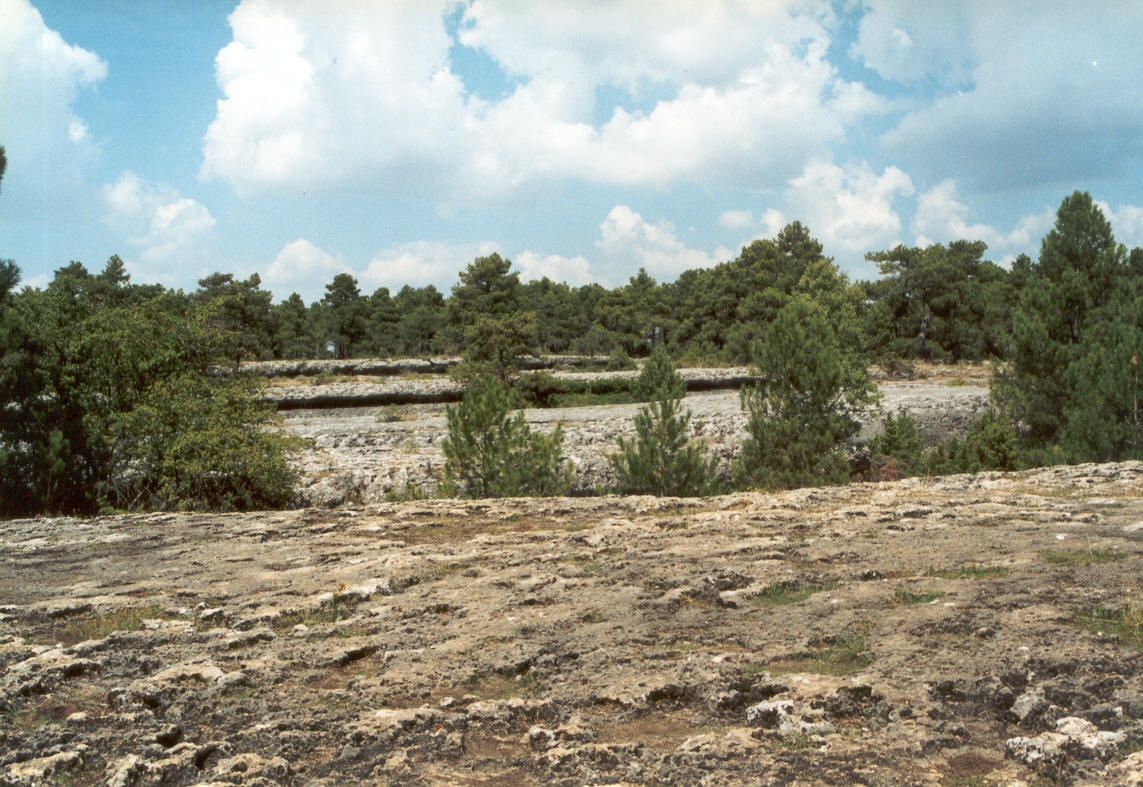
The stone sea

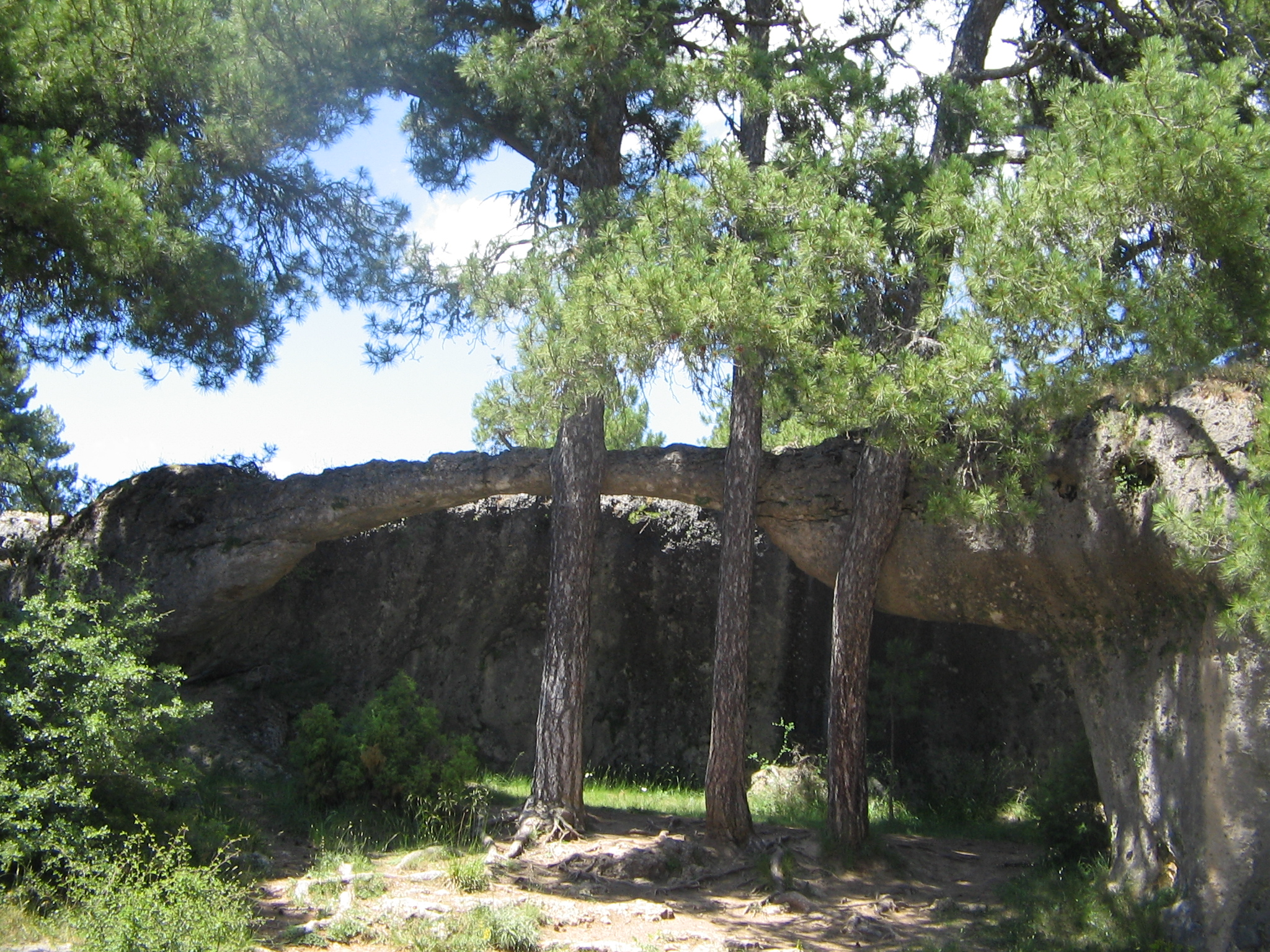
Battle of the crocodile and the elephant

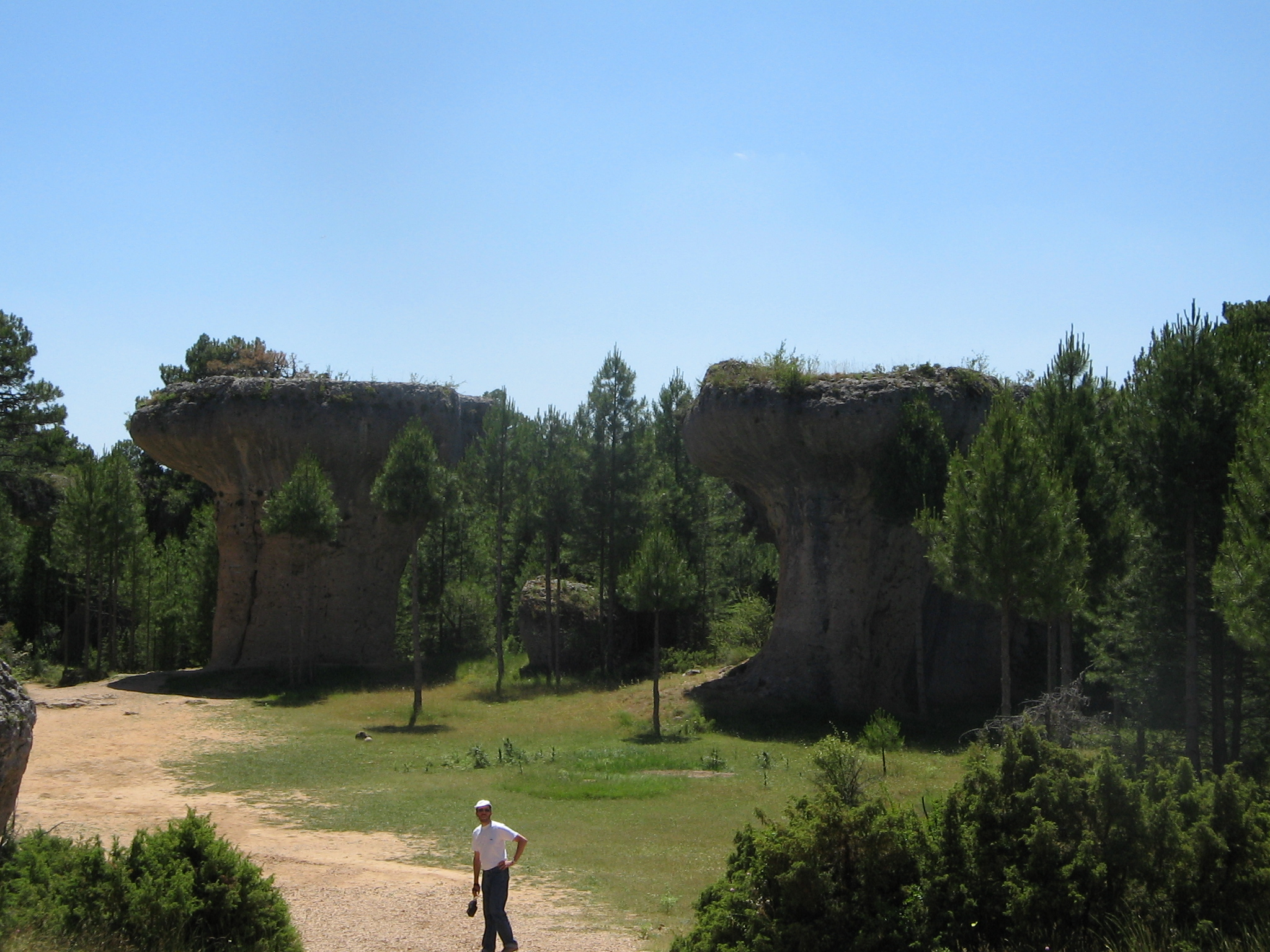
The mushrooms

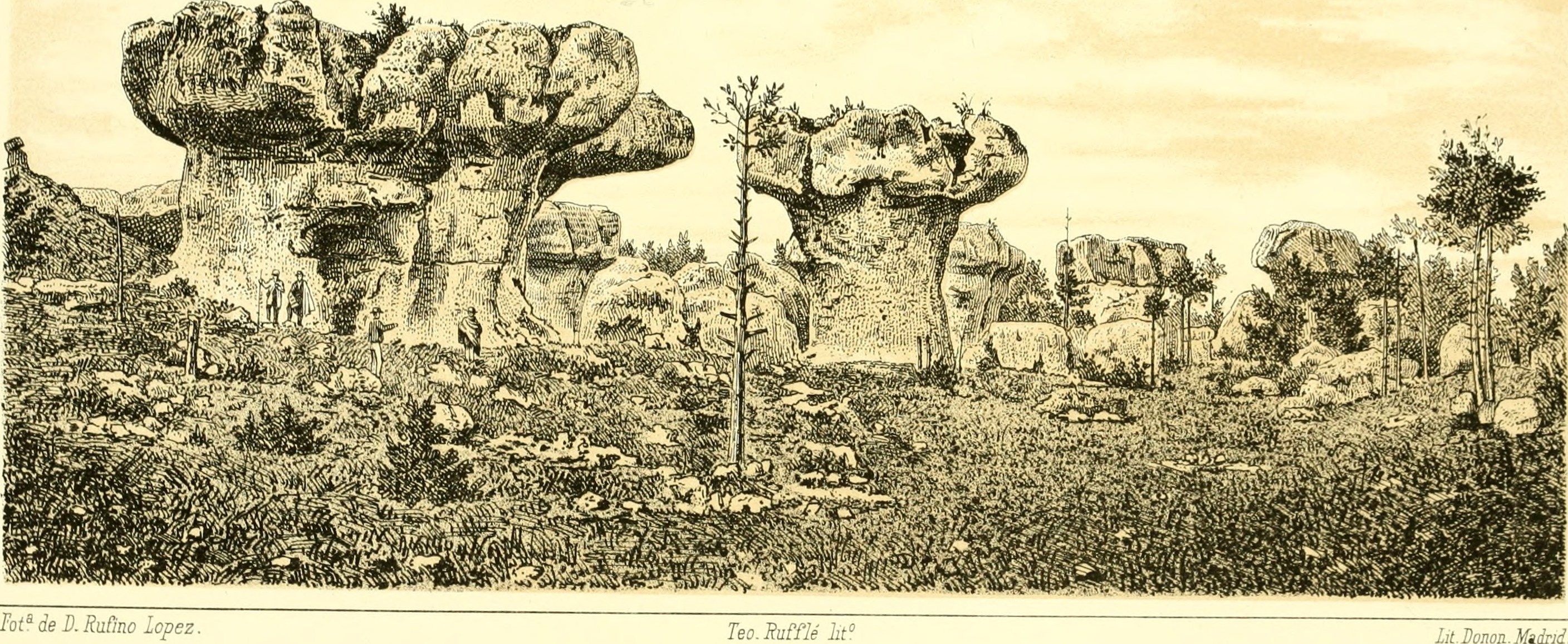
A drawing of Ciudad Encantada, circa 1875, published in Annals of the Spanish Society of Natural History

== See Also ==
- Hoodoo (geology)
