= La Hija de Dios =

- Municipality
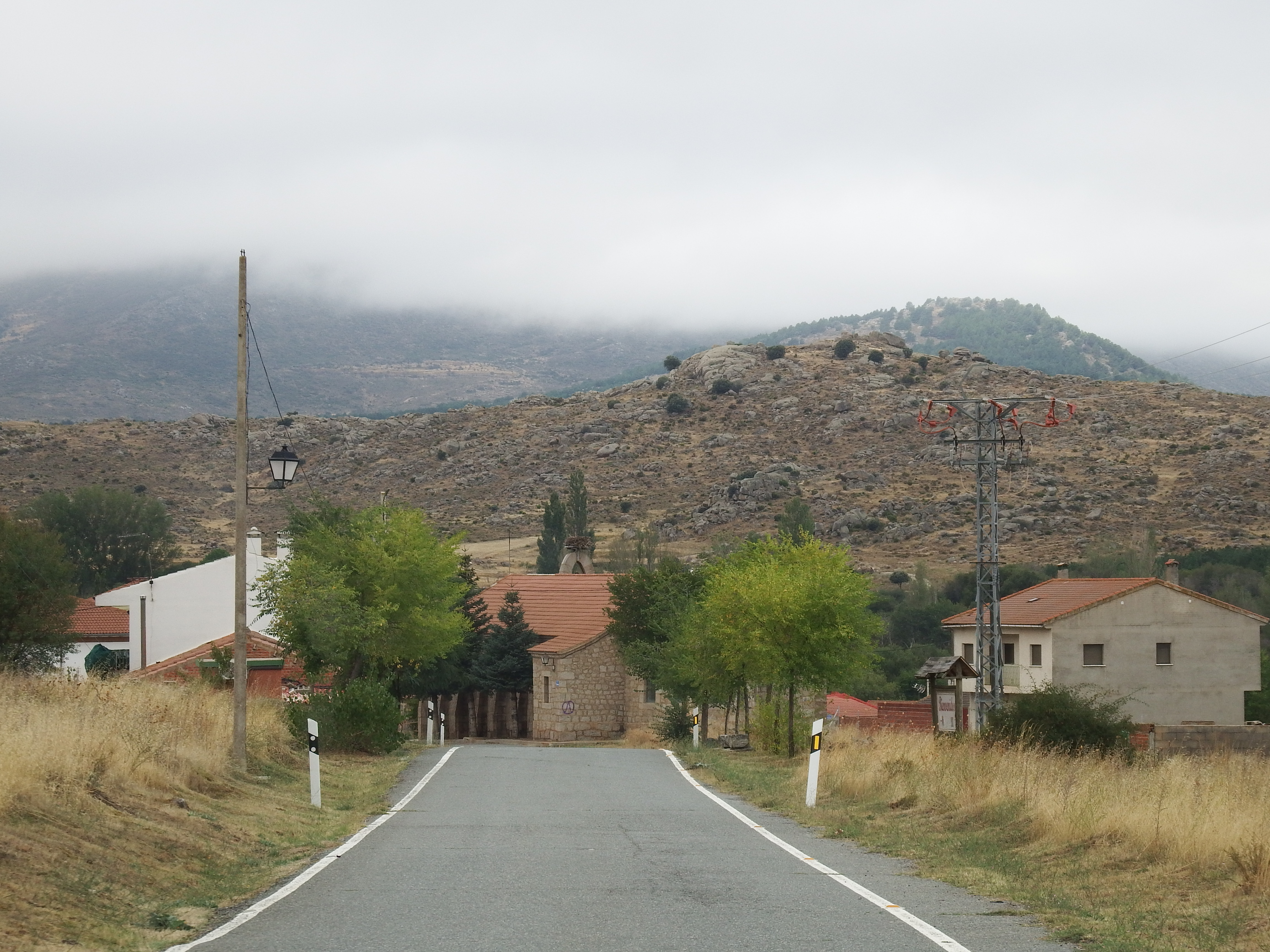

- Coat of arms

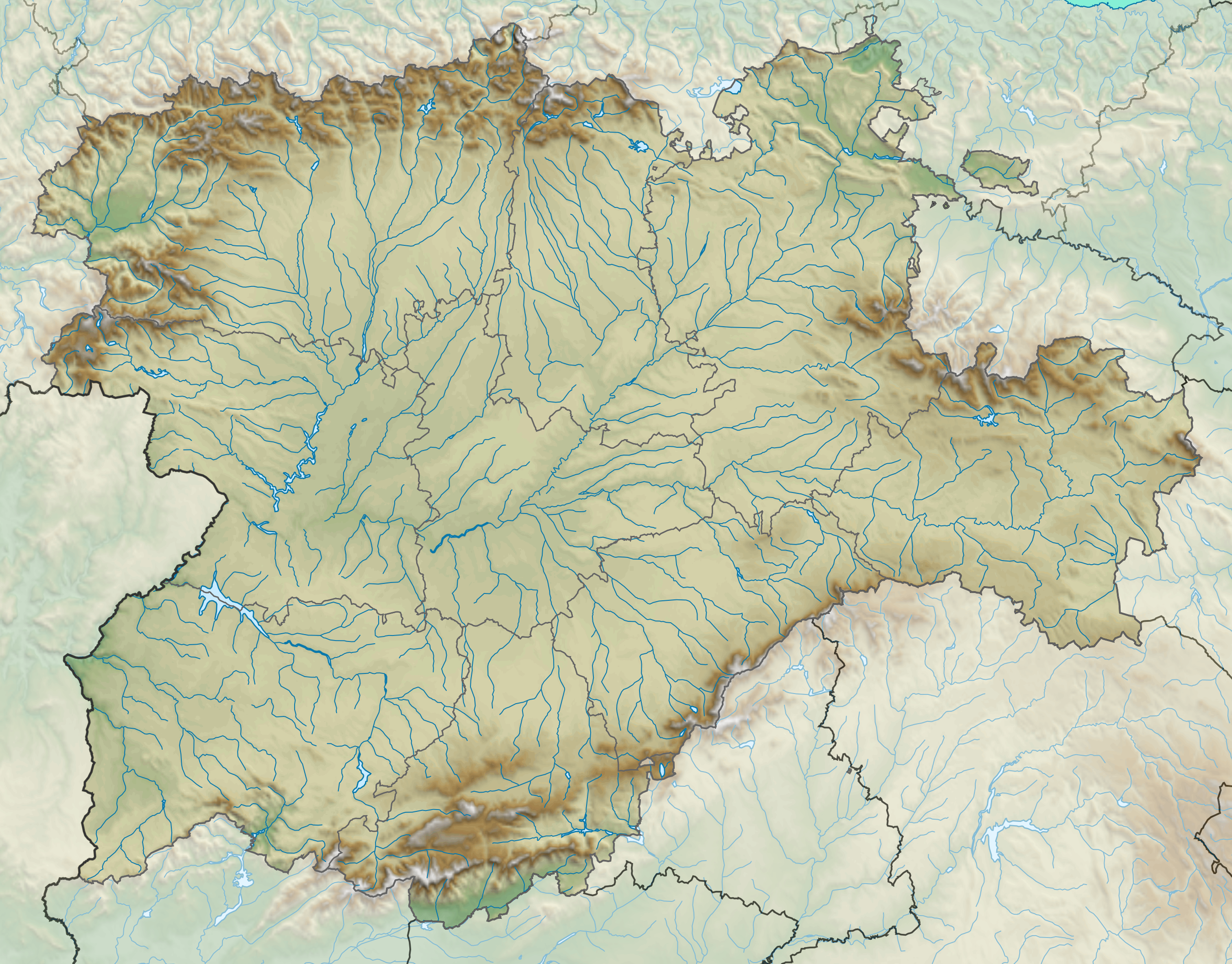
- Location within Castile and León Location within Spain
- Coordinates: 40°31′48″N 4°58′03″W
- Country: Spain
- Autonomous community: Castile and León
- Province: Ávila

Area
  - Total: 12.50 km^{2} (4.83 sq mi)
- Elevation: 1,179 m (3,868 ft)

Population (2025-01-01)
  - Total: 79
  - Density: 6.3/km^{2} (16/sq mi)
- Time zone: UTC+1 (CET)
  - Summer (DST): UTC+2 (CEST)
- Website: Official website

La Hija de Dios is a municipality of Spain located in the province of Ávila, Castile and León. The municipality has a total area of 12.50 km.

Towards the 13th century, the village, known as Filia Dei, was attached to the Archdeaconry of Ávila. Both the Spanish and the Latin name mean "God's daughter".

== Population ==
Historical population
Year	Pop.	±% p.a.
2023	80	—
2024	75	−6.25%
2025	79	+5.33%
Source: INE
