= List of assassinations in fiction =

Assassinations, the murder of a prominent person for a motive that is broadly ideological or political, have formed a major plot element in works of fiction.

Assassinations in fiction have attracted scholarly attention. In Assassinations and Murder in Modern Italy: Transformations in Society and Culture, Stephen Gundle and Lucia Rinaldi — as well as analyzing Italian assassinations in their historical and cultural contexts — explore films, plays, other forms of fiction, and works of art that have been inspired by the act of assassination. Nick Cullather has discussed "the movie version" of John F. Kennedy's assassination.

== Epic poems ==
- Judith (c. 800) – Old English, based on the Book of Judith (c. 100 BC)
- Das Nibelungenlied (c. 1200) – German
- Marko Marulić, Judita (1521) – Croatian

== Novels ==
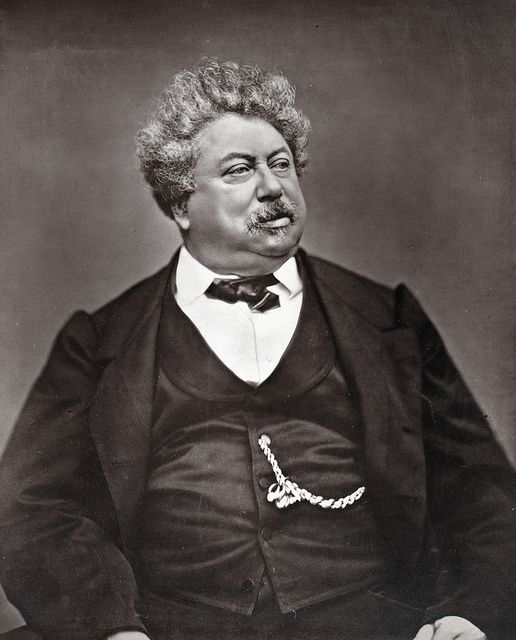
Alexandre Dumas, père

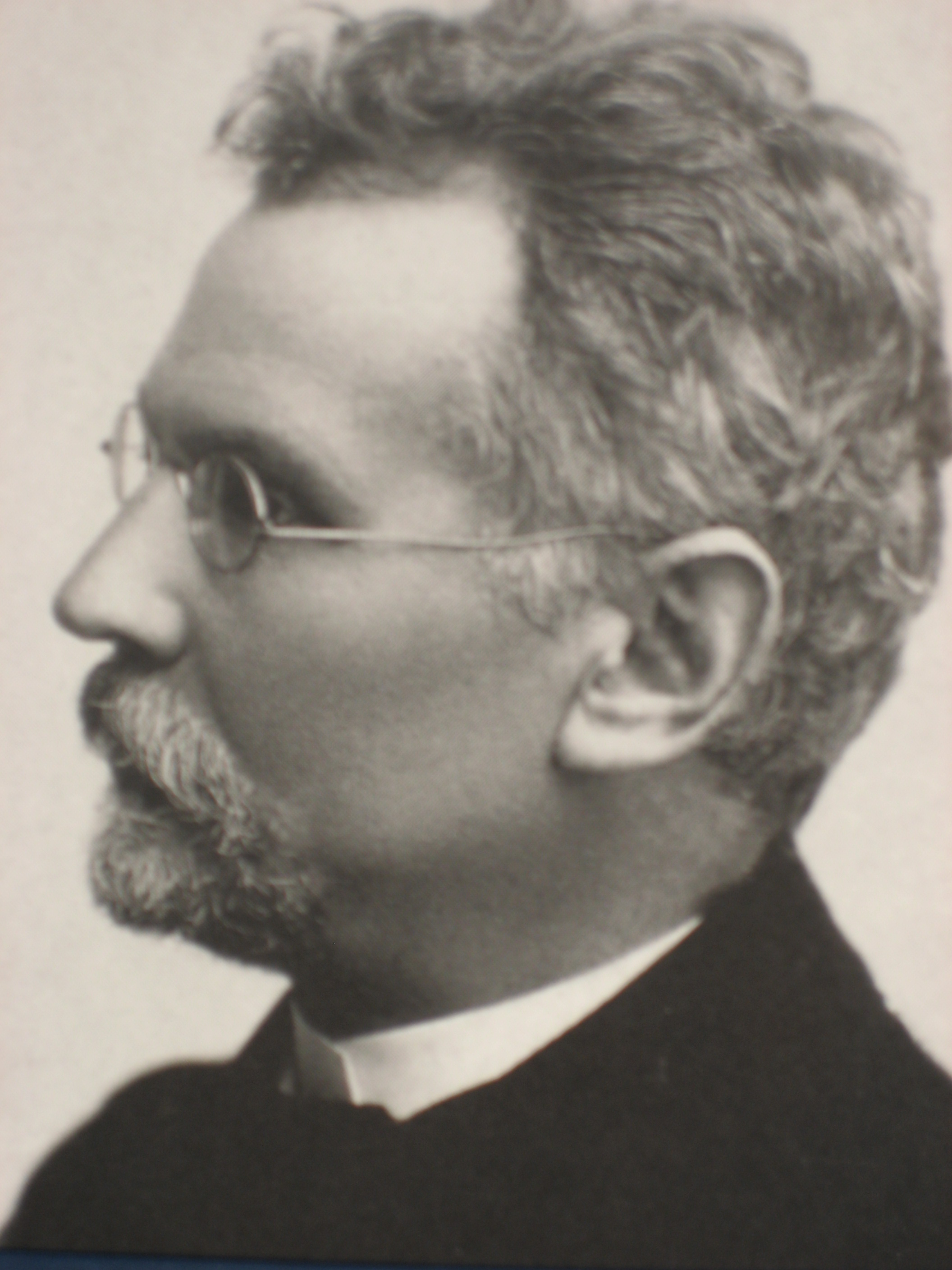
Bolesław Prus

Anthony Hope

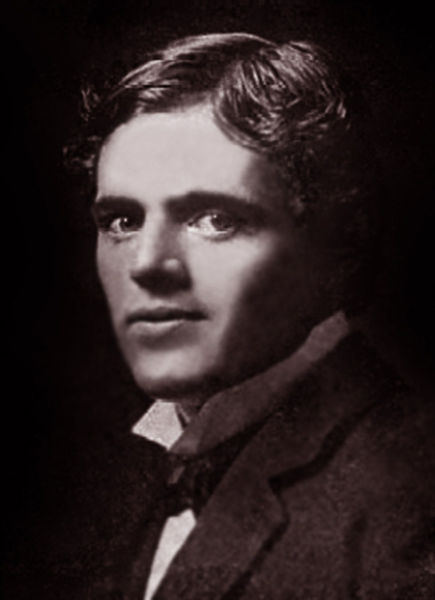
Jack London

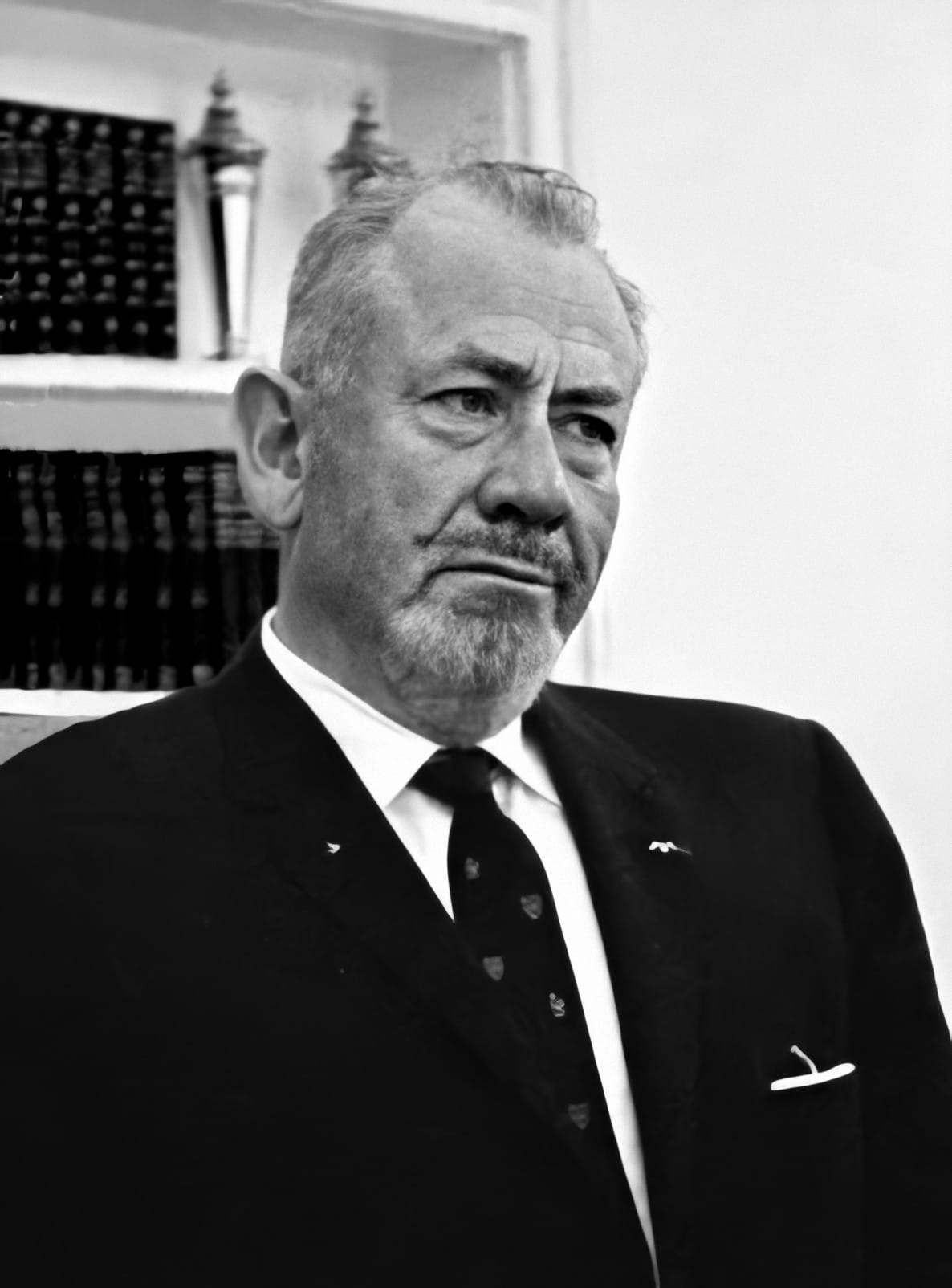
John Steinbeck

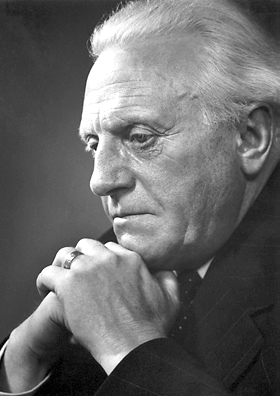
Pär Lagerkvist

- Alexandre Dumas, père, The Black Tulip (1850) – historical novel which features the assassination of Johan and Cornelis de Witt
- Bolesław Prus, Pharaoh (1895)
- Henryk Sienkiewicz, Quo Vadis: A Tale of the Time of Nero (1895) – historical novel about SS. Peter and Paul, Pisonian conspirators and Empress Poppaea, Emperor Nero
- Anthony Hope, Rupert of Hentzau (1898) – adventure novel and sombre finale to The Prisoner of Zenda (1894)
- J. M. Barrie, Better Dead (18??) – novella about a plot against Lord Randolph Churchill
- Frederick Rolfe, Hadrian the Seventh (1904)
- Jack London, The Iron Heel (1908) – violent dystopian novel
- Jack London, The Assassination Bureau, Ltd (c. 1910, published 1963) – novel half-written by London, completed by Robert L. Fish, possibly influenced by the J. M. Barrie novella, Better Dead.
- Joseph Conrad, Under Western Eyes (1911)
- Baroness Orczy, The Laughing Cavalier (1913) – historical novel about Maurice of Nassau
- John Buchan, The Thirty-Nine Steps (1915) – suspense novel; just the 1978 movie version features the attempted assassination of a fictional Greek Prime Minister
- André Malraux, Man's Fate (1933) – existential political novel
- Robert Graves, I, Claudius (1934), Claudius the God (1935) – historical novels about Roman Emperors Augustus, Tiberius, Caligula, Claudius, Nero
- John Steinbeck, In Dubious Battle (1936) – social realist novel about a Communist labour organizer supporting a strike by fruit pickers
- Sax Rohmer, President Fu Manchu (1936)
- Geoffrey Household, Rogue Male (1939)
- Arthur Koestler, Darkness at Noon (1940) – political novel about "Nikolai Rubashov" (Nikolai Bukharin, et al.)
- Robert A. Heinlein, "If This Goes On—" (serialized in 1940, published in the 1953 compilation Revolt in 2100)
- Pär Lagerkvist, The Dwarf (1944)
- Robert Penn Warren, All the King's Men (1946) – political novel about a Southern governor (Huey Long)
- Samuel Shellabarger, Prince of Foxes (1947) – historical novel about Cesare Borgia
- Josephine Tey, The Daughter of Time (1951) – historical novel about the Princes in the Tower
- Ian Fleming, James Bond series (1953–1966) – spy novel series featuring a licensed-to-kill protagonist who is described as having carried out assassinations, but rarely actually does so in the books themselves
  - From Russia, With Love (1957) – references Andrés Nin
- Philip K. Dick, Solar Lottery (1955) – science fiction novel with assassination as political system
- Graham Greene, The Quiet American (1955)
- Richard Condon, The Manchurian Candidate (1959)
- Elie Wiesel, Dawn (1961)
- Robert A. Heinlein, Stranger in a Strange Land (1961) – science fiction novel about a Messianic character
- Emeric Pressburger, Killing a Mouse on Sunday (1961) – filmed as Behold a Pale Horse
- Manuel Mujica Laínez, Bomarzo (1962) – historical novel about Pier Francesco Orsini
- Nick Carter (various authors), Run, Spy, Run (1964) – spy thriller featuring a foiled plot to kill President John F. Kennedy in September 1963; Temple of Fear (1968) – featuring a plot to assassinate Emperor Hirohito of Japan; Assault on England (1972) – spy thriller featuring multiple assassination attempts on the British cabinet, including Chancellor of the Exchequer, Minister of Defence and Foreign Secretary (all successful) and Prime Minister (unsuccessful); Agent Counter-Agent (1973) – featuring a foiled plot to assassinate the Vice President of the United States and President of Venezuela
- Mario Puzo, The Godfather (1969)
- Frederick Forsyth, The Day of the Jackal (1971) – suspense novel about Charles de Gaulle
- Loren Singer, The Parallax View (1972)
- Trevanian, The Eiger Sanction (1972)
- Michael Crichton (as John Lange), Binary (1972) – suspense novel about a U.S. President
- Trevanian, The Loo Sanction (1973)
- Richard Condon, Winter Kills (1974)
- Jack Higgins, The Eagle Has Landed (1975) – war novel about a plot by Himmler to capture Churchill
- Sjöwall and Wahlöö, The Terrorists (1975) – suspense novel about a Swedish Prime Minister (not Olof Palme)
- Trevanian, Shibumi (1979)
- Frederick Forsyth, The Devil's Alternative (1979) – complex novel involving a plot to start rebellion in Ukraine in which the KGB chief Yuri Ivanenko is murdered
- Stephen King, The Dead Zone (1979)
- Robert Ludlum, The Bourne Identity (1980)
- Mary Renault, Funeral Games (1981) – historical novel about Roxana, Alexander IV, and others
- Harry Mulisch, The Assault (1982)
- Alan Moore, V for Vendetta (1982–1988) – graphic novel featuring numerous assassinations of governmental and quasi-governmental officials by the eponymous character, V
- Jean Van Hamme (and William Vance), XIII (1984) – graphic novel about a U.S. President
- Tom Clancy, Patriot Games (1987) – suspense novel about the Prince and Princess of Wales
- Don DeLillo, Libra (1988)
- Frederick Forsyth, The Negotiator—complex novel, in which Simon Cormack, son of President of the United States John Cormack is kidnapped for ransom (which protagonist Quinn has to deliver) and is then murdered during his return
- Jack Higgins, The Eagle Has Flown (1991) – war novel about a plot by Himmler to assassinate Hitler, Rommel and Canaris
- John Grisham, The Pelican Brief (1992) – suspense novel which opens with the assassinations of two Supreme Court justices in one night
- Tom Clancy, Debt of Honor (1994) – war novel that ends with the bombing of the Capitol Building, wiping out the entire U.S. government except for the newly confirmed Vice President
- Frederick Forsyth, The Fist of God (1994) – factual novel about supergun designer Gerald Bull
- Nicholas Shakespeare, The Dancer Upstairs (1995)
- James Ellroy, American Tabloid (1995) – novel about John F. Kennedy and the Bay of Pigs invasion
- Tom Clancy, Executive Orders (1996)
- Vince Flynn, Term Limits (1997)
- Philip Kerr, The Shot (1999) Alternate take on Kennedy assassination
- Vince Flynn, Transfer of Power (1999) – suspense novel about a U.S. President and the White House
- Boris Akunin, The State Counsellor (2000) – historical mystery novel about a Moscow governor
- Tom Clancy, The Bear and the Dragon (2000)
- Günter Grass, Crabwalk (2002) – investigative novel about Wilhelm Gustloff
- Lee Child, Without Fail (2002)
- Tom Clancy, Red Rabbit (2002) – suspense novel about Pope John Paul II and Georgi Markov
- Ismail Kadare, The Successor (2003) – novel about Mehmet Shehu
- Barry Eisler, Hard Rain (2003)
- Nicholson Baker, Checkpoint (2004) – political novel about George W. Bush
- Jack Higgins, Dark Justice (2004) – suspense novel about a U.S. President
- J. K. Rowling, Harry Potter and the Half-Blood Prince, a fantasy novel in which Draco Malfoy is under orders to assassinate the headmaster of Hogwarts School of Witchcraft and Wizardry
- Brent Weeks, The Night Angel Trilogy (2008) – fantasy series
- Barbara Kingsolver, The Lacuna (2009) – novel about Leon Trotsky
- Leonardo Padura Fuentes, The Man Who Loved Dogs (2009) – novel about Leon Trotsky
- David Baldacci The Innocent (2012)— features professional killer Will Robie who is an American covert operative specializing in assassinating high profile targets

== Short stories ==
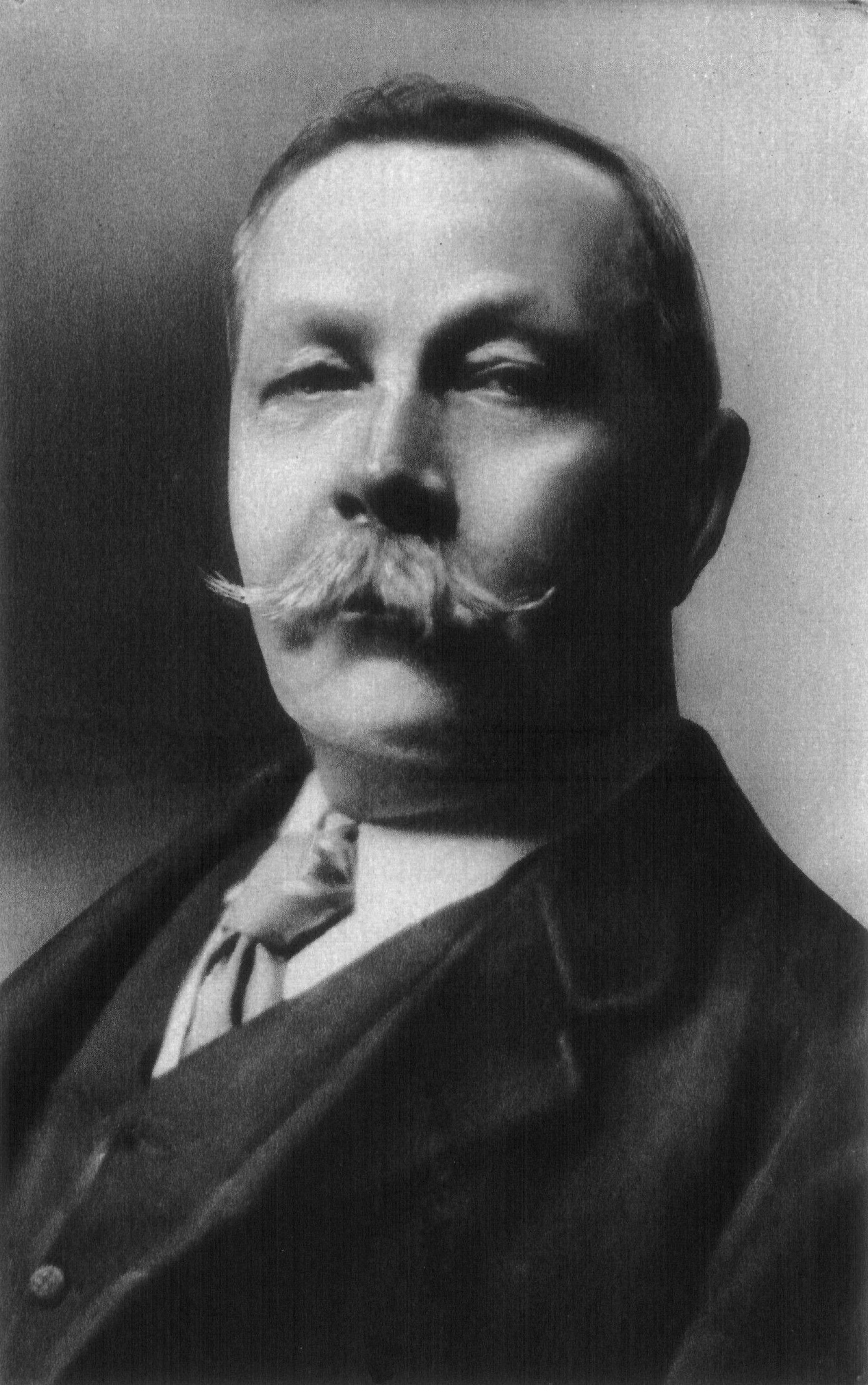
Conan Doyle

- Sir Arthur Conan Doyle, "The Adventure of the Red Circle" (1911) – Sherlock Holmes short story about a New York mob hit in London
- Liam O'Flaherty, "The Sniper" (1923)
- Agatha Christie, "The Kidnapped Prime Minister" (1924) – Hercule Poirot short story about the kidnapping of a fictional British prime minister, which includes a deliberate attempt on his life
- Ernest Hemingway, "The Killers" (1927)
- Robert A. Heinlein, Revolt in 2100 (serialized in 1940, published as a book in 1953)
- Philip K. Dick, "The Last of the Masters" (1954) – science fiction novella in which the last dictator on earth is assassinated by anarchists, successfully overthrowing the last government
- Hilary Mantel, “The Assassination of Margaret Thatcher” (2014)

== Plays and operas ==
Shakespeare

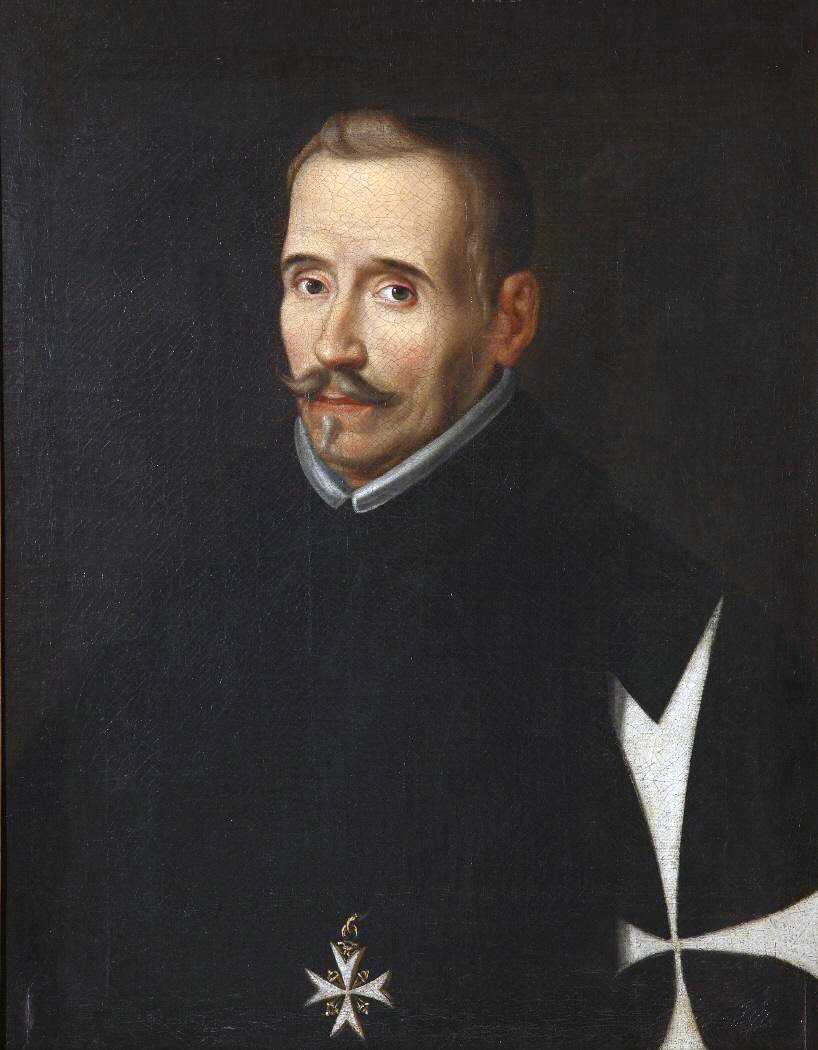
de Vega

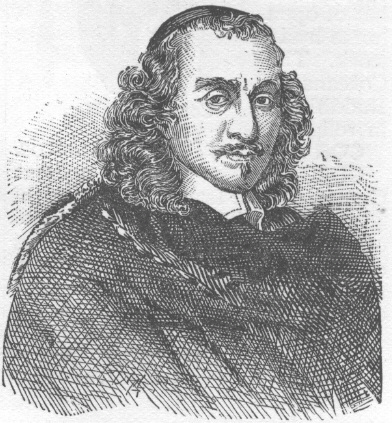
Corneille

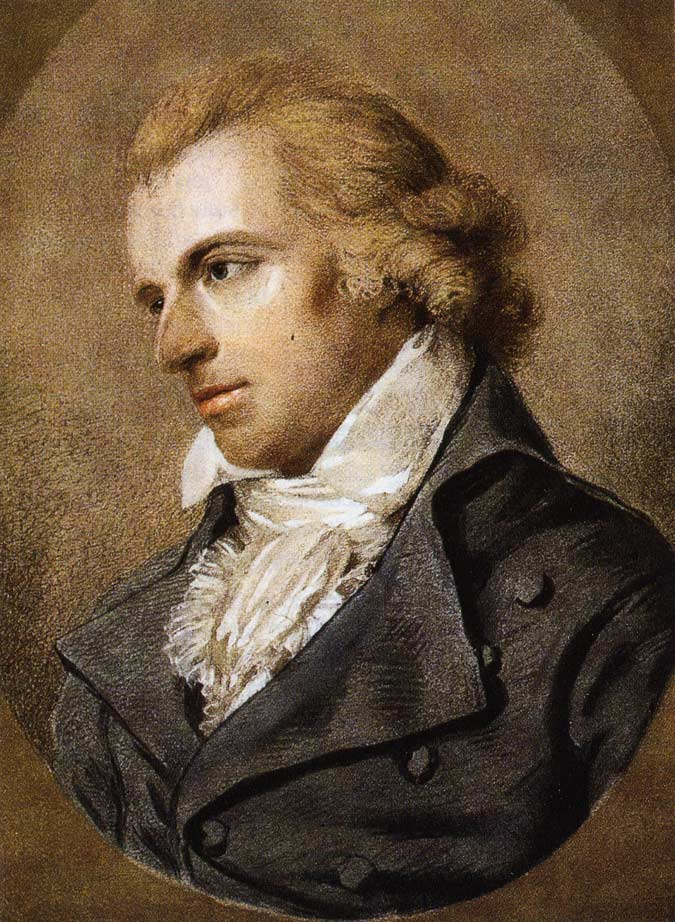
Schiller

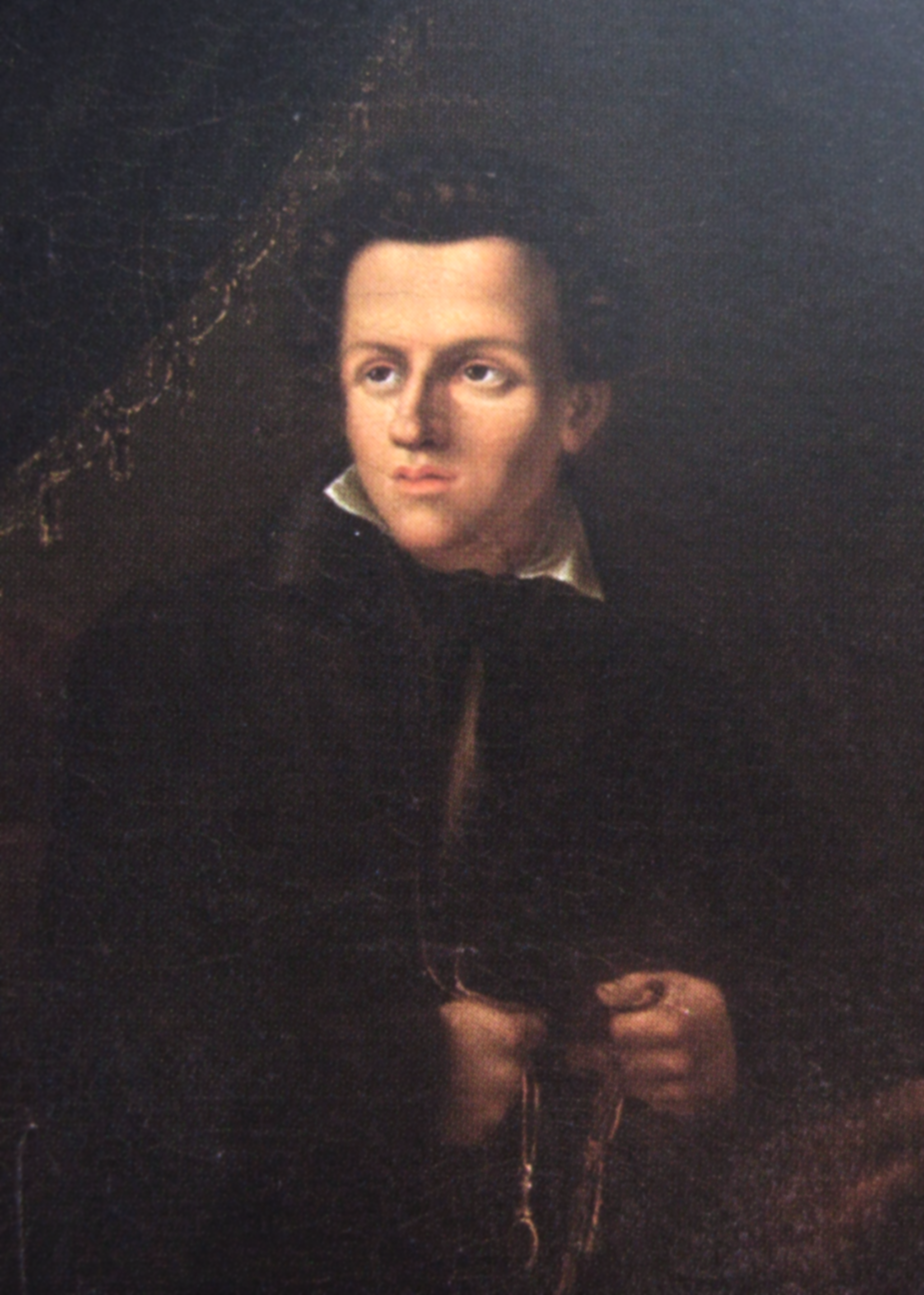
Słowacki

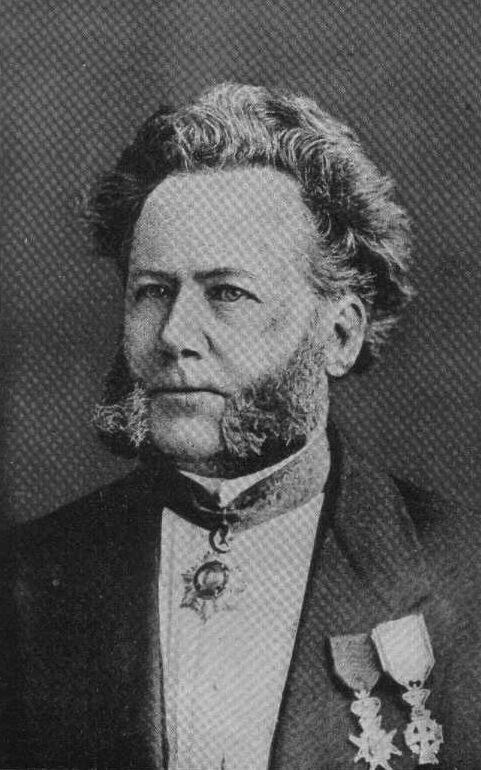
Ibsen

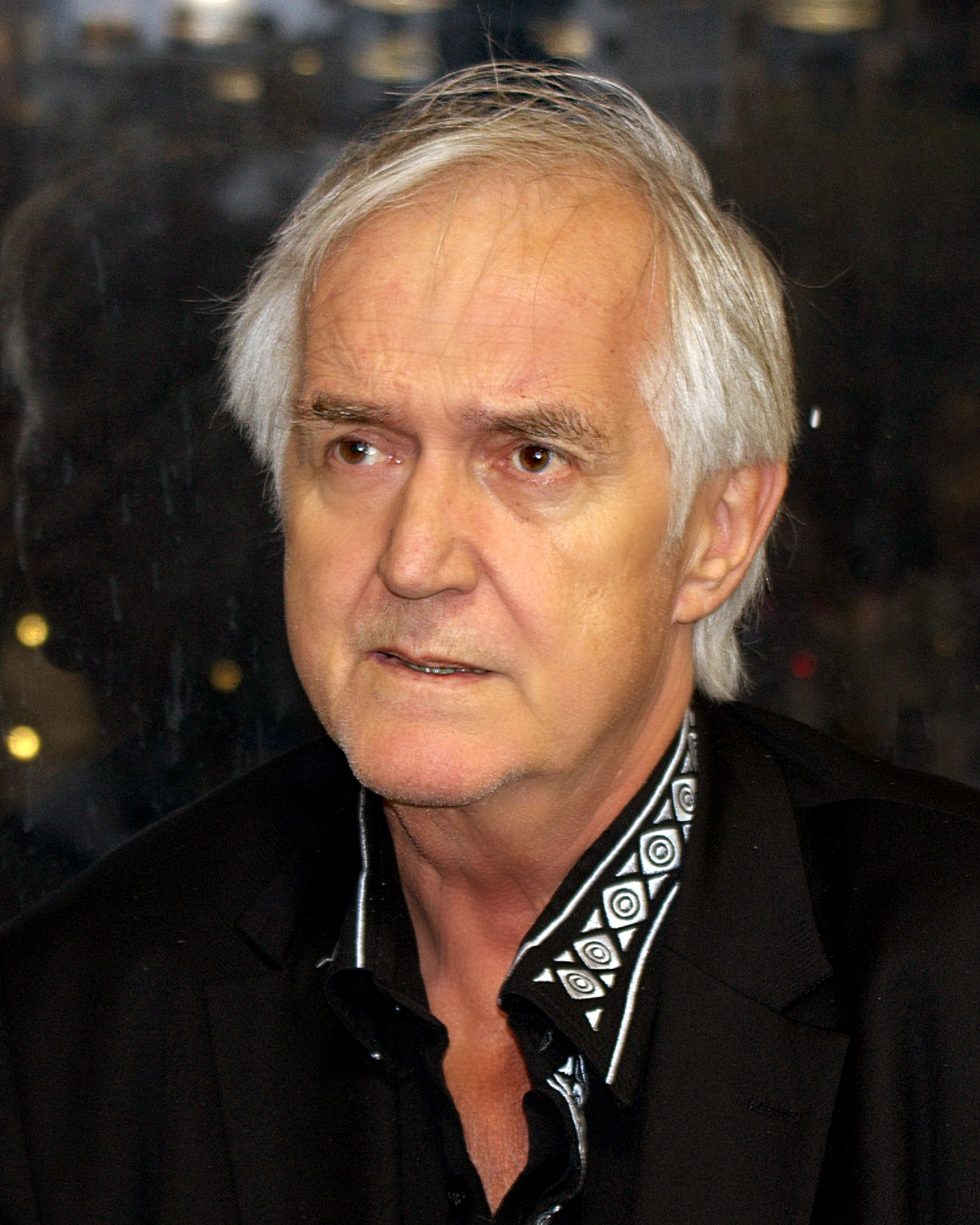
Mankell

- William Shakespeare, Henry VI, Part 3 (1590) – play about English King Henry VI
- Christopher Marlowe, Edward II (1592) – play about English King Edward II
- William Shakespeare, Julius Caesar (probably 1599) – play about Julius Caesar
- William Shakespeare, Hamlet (between 1600 and summer 1602) – play about Hamlet
- William Shakespeare, Macbeth (between 1603 and 1606) – play about King Duncan
- Lope de Vega, Fuente Ovejuna (between 1612 and 1614) – play about the village of Fuente Ovejuna
- Pierre Corneille, Cinna (1639) – play about Augustus and Cinna
- Jean Racine, Britannicus (1669) – play about Britannicus
- Takeda Izumo, Miyoshi Shōraku, and Namiki Senryū, Kanadehon Chūshingura (1748) – puppet play about the Forty-seven Ronin
- Friedrich Schiller, Mary Stuart (1800) – play about Mary, Queen of Scots and Queen Elizabeth I
- Victor Hugo, Le roi s'amuse (1832) – scathing, banned play about French King Francis I (and, indirectly, King Louis Philippe I)
- Eugène Scribe and Daniel Auber, Gustave III, ou Le bal masqué (1833) – opera about Swedish King Gustav III
- In Polish poet Juliusz Słowacki's 1833 play Kordian, the teen title hero plots to assassinate Russian Tsar Nicholas I—but fails to carry through.
- Giuseppe Bardari and Gaetano Donizetti, Maria Stuarda (1835) – opera based on Schiller's play
- Béni Egressy and Ferenc Erkel, Hunyadi László (1844) – opera about Ulrich of Celje and László Hunyadi
- Temistocle Solera (and Francesco Maria Piave) and Giuseppe Verdi, Attila (1846) – opera based on play by Werner
- Francesco Maria Piave and Giuseppe Verdi, Macbeth (1847) – opera based on Shakespeare's tragedy
- Francesco Maria Piave and Giuseppe Verdi, Rigoletto (1851) – opera based on Hugo's Le roi s'amuse, with a fictional Duke of Mantua replacing French King Francis I
- Francesco Maria Piave and Giuseppe Verdi, Simon Boccanegra (1857) – opera based on play by García Gutiérrez
- Antonio Somma and Giuseppe Verdi, Un ballo in maschera (1859) – opera about Swedish King Gustav III
- Michel Carré and Ambroise Thomas, Hamlet (1868) – opera based on Shakespeare's tragedy
- Henrik Ibsen, Emperor and Galilean (1873) – play about Roman Emperor Julian the Apostate
- Richard Wagner, Götterdämmerung (1876) – opera about the hero Siegfried
- Alfred Lord Tennyson, Becket (188?) – play about Thomas Becket
- Modest Mussorgsky, Khovanshchina (1880) – opera about Ivan Khovansky
- Oscar Wilde, Salomé (1891) – tragedy about John the Baptist and Salome
- Richard Strauss, Salome (1905) – opera based on Wilde's tragedy
- Eugene O'Neill, The Emperor Jones (1920) – play about a Caribbean dictator
- Bertolt Brecht, The Life of Edward II of England (1924) – play about English King Edward II
- Kathleen de Jaffa and Louis Gruenberg, The Emperor Jones (1933) – opera based on O'Neill's play
- E. Cecil-Smith, Mildred Goldberg, Frank Love and Oscar Ryan, Eight Men Speak (1933) – play about assassination attempt on Canadian Tim Buck
- Albert Camus, The Just Assassins (1949) – play about Russian Grand Duke Sergei
- T.S. Eliot, Murder in the Cathedral (1935) – play about Thomas Becket
- Ildebrando Pizzetti, Assassinio nella cattedrale (1958) – opera about Thomas Becket
- Jean Anouilh, Becket or The Honour of God (1959) – play about Thomas Becket
- Peter Weiss, Marat/Sade (1963) – musical play about Jean-Paul Marat
- Peter Shaffer, The Royal Hunt of the Sun (1964) – play about Atahualpa
- Manuel Mujica Laínez and Alberto Ginastera, Bomarzo (1967) – opera based on Mujica Laínez's novel
- James Prideaux, The Last of Mrs. Lincoln (1972) – play about Abraham Lincoln
- Carlisle Floyd, Willie Stark (1981) – opera based on Robert Penn Warren's novel All the King's Men, in turn inspired by the life of the Louisiana governor Huey Long.
- Rolf Hochhuth, Soldiers (1967) – play about Władysław Sikorski
- John Weidman and Stephen Sondheim, Assassins (1990) – musical
- Alice Goodman and John Adams, The Death of Klinghoffer (1991) – opera about Leon Klinghoffer
- Michael Kunze and Sylvester Levay, Elisabeth (1992) – musical about "Sissi", Queen Empress of Austro-Hungary
- David Ives, Variations on the Death of Trotsky (1993) – comedy about Leon Trotsky
- Emily Mann, Execution of Justice (199?) – play about George Moscone and Harvey Milk
- Pradeep Dalavi, Me Nathuram Godse Boltoy (2000?) – play about Mahatma Gandhi
- Lee Blessing, Whores (2002) – play about Ita Ford, Dorothy Kazel, Maura Clarke, and Jean Donovan
- Henning Mankell, Politik (2010) – play about Olof Palme

== Films ==
Frank Sinatra in Suddenly (1954)

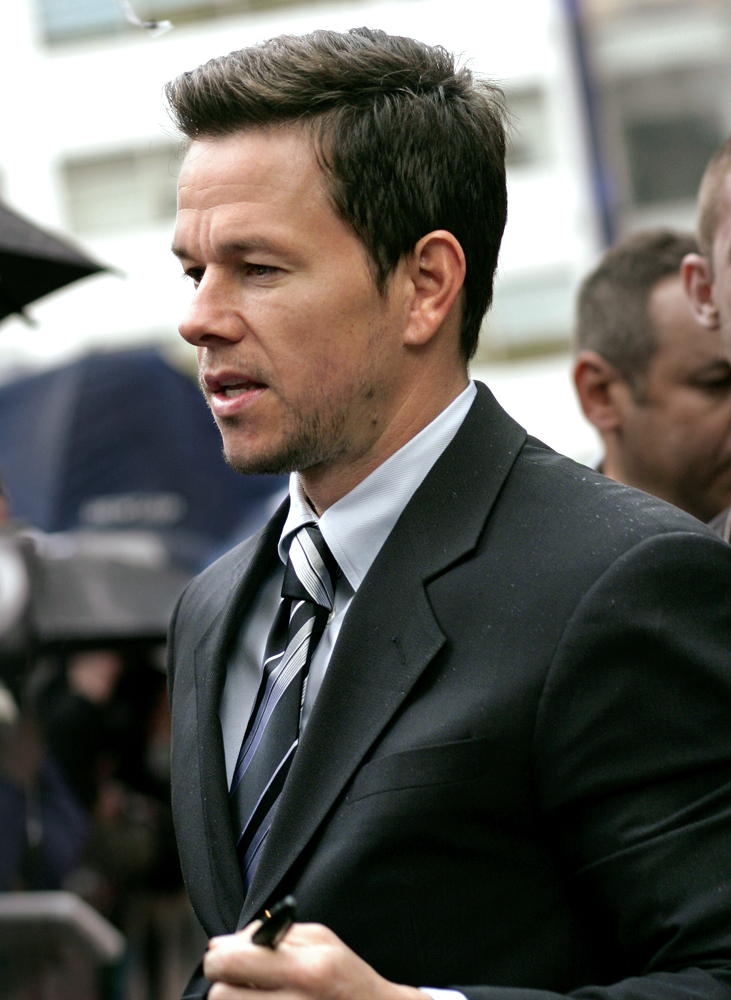
Mark Wahlberg at 2007 Shooter premiere

The list is organized chronologically by year of release, rather than year of production.
Within each year, films based on genuine historical events are listed first, followed by any purely fictional entries.

=== 1890s ===
- The Execution of Mary Stuart – 1895 Re-enactment of the beheading of Mary, Queen of Scots by Alfred Clark

=== 1900s ===
- Hamlet – 1900 French sound short by Clément Maurice in which Hamlet is killed by Laertes, based on Shakespeare's tragedy
- Execution of Czolgosz with Panorama of Auburn Prison – 1901 short by Edwin S. Porter recreates the electrocution of U.S. President McKinley's assassin in 1901
- The Martyred Presidents – 1901 short by Edwin S. Porter memorializes the three murdered U.S. Presidents, Lincoln, Garfield, and McKinley

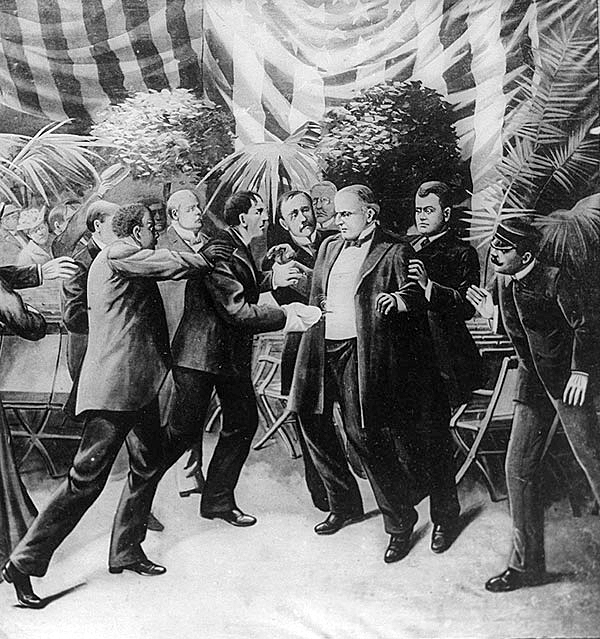
Assassination of President McKinley, 1901

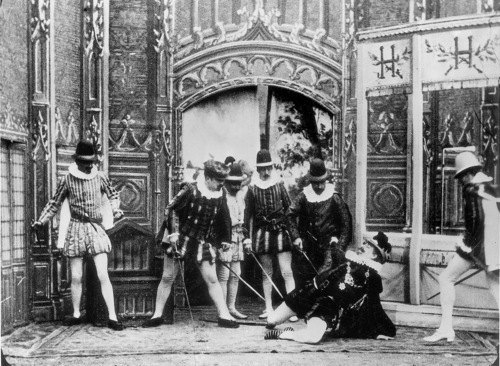
The Duke of Guise, assassinated nobleman

- The Assassination of the Duke of Guise – 1908 French short by Charles Le Bargy on the 1588 assassination of the Duc de Guise by King Henri III at the Château de Blois
- Macbeth – 1908 short by J. Stuart Blackton, based on the tragedy by Shakespeare, in which King Duncan is murdered by his thane Macbeth, loosely based on the death of Duncan I in 1040 – followed by numerous other versions
- A Fool's Revenge – 1909 film by D. W. Griffith in which a jester and protective father arranges the assassination of his lascivious lord, based on Hugo's play Le roi s'amuse and Verdi's opera Rigoletto

=== 1910s ===
- Chūshingura – c. 1910 Japanese film by Shōzō Makino, about the Forty-seven rōnin, a group of samurai who plotted to avenge their lord's death in 1701 – also, earlier 1907 short by Ryo Konishi
- The Life and Deeds of the Immortal Leader Karađorđe – 1911 Serbian film by Ilija Stanojević, the first Serbian feature, about the 1817 assassination of Karadjordje Petrović, leader of the First Serbian Uprising against the Ottomans, by agents of Prince Miloš Obrenović

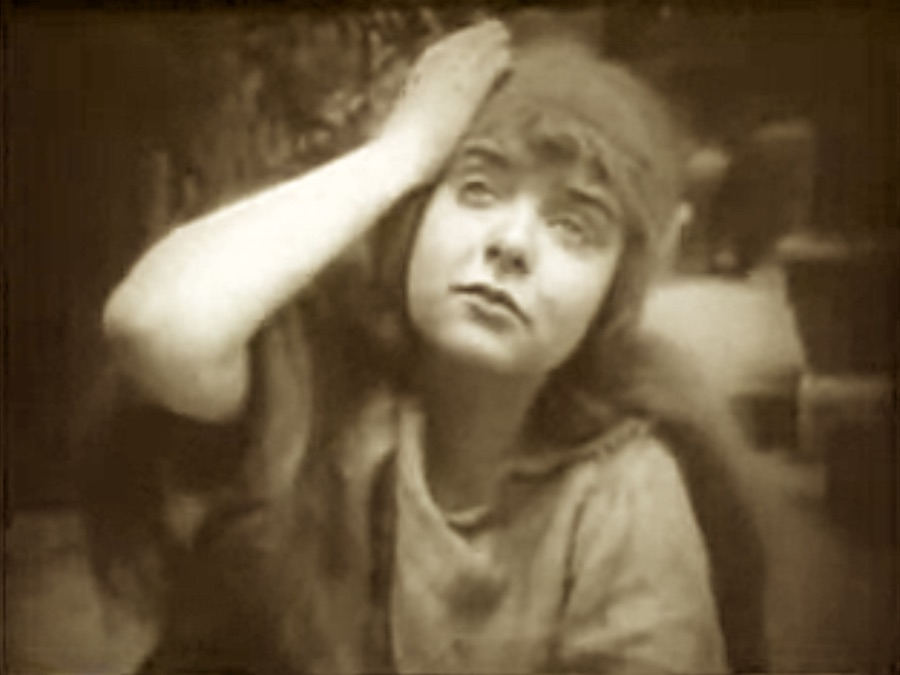
Judith of Bethulia, heroine, assassin

- Judith of Bethulia – 1914 film by D. W. Griffith on the beheading of Assyrian general Holofernes by Biblical heroine Judith, based on the Book of Judith
- The Birth of a Nation – 1915 film by D. W. Griffith recreates the assassination of Abraham Lincoln by a John Wilkes Booth inside Ford's Theatre in 1865

=== 1920s ===
- The Black Tulip Festival – 1920 German film directed by Marie Luise Droop and Muhsin Ertugrul about the staged lynching of Dutch politicians Johan and Cornelis de Witt in 1672, based on the novel by Alexandre Dumas
- The Black Tulip – 1921 Anglo-Dutch film by Maurits Binger and Frank Richardson about the staged lynching of Dutch politicians Johan and Cornelis de Witt in 1672, based on the novel by Alexandre Dumas
- In the Days of Buffalo Bill – 1922 serial by Edward Laemmle included the assassination of Abraham Lincoln by a John Wilkes Booth in 1865
- Young Medardus – 1923 Austrian film by Michael Curtiz in which young Viennese, following the occupation of Vienna in 1809, plan to assassinate Napoleon, based on the play by Schnitzler
- Becket – 1923 film by George Ridgwell about the assassination of Archbishop of Canterbury Thomas Becket in 1170, based on the play by Tennyson
- Rupert of Hentzau – 1923 film by Victor Heerman in which the King of Ruritania is assassinated (but not his look-alike, as in the novel by Anthony Hope) – also, earlier 1916 version with Henry Ainley
- The Dramatic Life of Abraham Lincoln – 1924 film by Phil Rosen depicts the career and the assassination of Lincoln by a Booth in 1865
- Die Nibelungen: Siegfried – 1924 German film by Fritz Lang about the hero Siegfried and his assassination by the Burgundian Hagen, based on the c. 1200 epic poem The Nibelungenlied
- Die Nibelungen: Kriemhilds Rache – 1924 German sequel by Fritz Lang in which Kriemhild, avenging her husband Siegfried, kills Hagen in a plot involving her second husband, Hunnish King Etzel
- Ben-Hur – 1925 film by Fred Niblo in which a Jewish nobleman is sentenced to the galleys after a perceived assassination attempt on Valerius Gratus, the Roman Procurator of Judea
- Napoléon – 1927 French film by Abel Gance, about the early career of Napoleon Bonaparte, includes the assassination of Jean-Paul Marat in 1793
- Das Schicksal derer von Habsburg – 1928 German film by Rolf Raffé about the assassinations of "Sissi", Queen Empress of Austro-Hungary in 1898, and Archduke Franz Ferdinand and his wife in 1914
- Judith and Holofernes – 1929 Italian film directed by Baldassarre Negroni, on the beheading of Assyrian general Holofernes by Biblical heroine Judith, based on the Book of Judith

=== 1930s ===
- Abraham Lincoln – 1930 film by D.W. Griffith about the assassination of President Abraham Lincoln
- Rasputin and the Empress – 1932 film by Richard Boleslawski about the murdered monk, Rasputin
- Scarface – 1932 film by Howard Hawks about a gangster, based on Al Capone, includes incidents based on the murders of James Colosimo in 1920, Dion O'Banion in 1924, and the Saint Valentine's Day massacre in 1929
- Hans Westmar – 1933 banned German propaganda film by Franz Wenzler about a murdered stormtrooper, based on the life of Nazi martyr Horst Wessel, immortalized by the Nazi Party anthem "Die Fahne hoch"
- The Man Who Dared – 1933 film by Hamilton MacFadden about the assassination of an immigrant mayor of Chicago, based on Anton Cermak, killed earlier in 1933 during the attempted murder of President-elect Roosevelt by a delusional anarchist
- The Emperor Jones – 1933 film by Dudley Murphy where, on a Caribbean island, an escaped U.S. convict has become a self-styled Emperor, but is now hunted by his rebellious subjects, based on the play by Nobel laureate Eugene O'Neill
- Cleopatra – 1934 film by Cecil B. DeMille, about the Egyptian queen, includes the assassination of Julius Caesar in 44 BC.
- The Iron Duke – 1934 film by Victor Saville about the contrived execution of Marshal Ney for treason by French King Louis XVIII in 1815, during the White Terror which followed the Bourbon Restoration
- The Man Who Knew Too Much – 1934 film by Alfred Hitchcock about a British family on holiday in Switzerland who become involved in an assassination plot
- The Prisoner of Shark Island – 1936 film by John Ford about the imprisonment of Dr. Samuel Mudd, following the Lincoln assassination in 1865
- The Plainsman – 1936 film by Cecil B. DeMille includes the murder of lawman Wild Bill Hickok in 1876
- Fury – 1936 film by Fritz Lang in which an accused man persecutes those who nearly lynched him, inspired by the 1933 Brooke Hart lynching case where the California Governor colluded with the mob
- Secret Agent – 1936 film by Alfred Hitchcock about a British spy sent to assassinate a German agent
- They Won't Forget – 1937 film by Mervyn LeRoy about the lynching of a New York factory owner, based on the 1915 Leo Frank case
- I, Claudius – 1937 film by Josef von Sternberg on political violence in ancient Rome, as observed by Emperor Claudius, involving the rumoured assassination of Emperor Tiberius by Emperor Caligula, and the assassinations of Caligula and Caesonia – unfinished, but footage survives
- Frontier Marshal – 1939 film by Allan Dwan in which Doc Halliday is killed by Curly Bill
- Jesse James – 1939 film by Henry King about the assassination of outlaw Jesse James
- Juarez – 1939 film by William Dieterle about the 1867 execution of Mexican Emperor Maximilian by President Juárez
- Five Came Back – 1939 film by John Farrow in which the crash of a passenger plane in the Amazon rainforest allows an anarchist assassin to re-evaluate himself

=== 1940s ===
- A Dispatch from Reuter's – 1940 film by William Dieterle in which Paul Reuter proves the value of his telegraphic news service by reporting the assassination of President Lincoln in 1865
- Brigham Young – 1940 film by Henry Hathaway in which Joseph Smith is killed by an angry mob
- Foreign Correspondent – 1940 film by Alfred Hitchcock in which a diplomat's decoy is assassinated in Amsterdam
- Man Hunt – 1941 film by Fritz Lang, based on Geoffrey Household's 1939 novel, Rogue Male. A British hunter vacationing in the Bavarian Alps near the Berghof, Hitler's home in Berchtesgaden, gets Hitler in his gun sight and ponders whether or not he should shoot him.
- Tennessee Johnson – 1942 film by William Dieterle about Vice President Andrew Johnson, who assumes the Presidency following the assassination of Abraham Lincoln in 1865
- Hangmen Also Die – 1943 film by Fritz Lang about the 1942 assassination of Nazi Reinhard Heydrich
- Hitler's Madman – 1943 film by Douglas Sirk about the 1942 assassination of Nazi Reinhard Heydrich and the subsequent reprisal against the Czech village of Lidice
- Ivan the Terrible, Part I – 1944 Soviet film by Sergei Eisenstein about the suspected poisoning in 1560 of Tsarina Anastasia, consort of Tsar Ivan IV
- Rome, Open City – Palme d'Or-winning, Oscar-nominated 1945 Italian film by Roberto Rossellini in which Italian Resistance leaders are tortured to death by the Gestapo
- The Murderers Are Among Us – 1946 German film by Wolfgang Staudte about a demobilized Berliner who plans to assassinate his former officer, a war criminal
- The Killers – 1946 film by Robert Siodmak about two hitmen, based on the story by Nobel laureate Ernest Hemingway
- All the King's Men – 1949 film by Robert Rossen about the assassination of Southern governor Willie Stark, inspired by the 1935 death of Louisiana governor Huey Long
- Border Incident – 1949 film by Anthony Mann in which a Mexican federal PJF agent, undercover as a bracero, is targeted by corrupt U.S. ranchers
- Prince of Foxes – 1949 film by Henry King in which an artist and an assassin join forces against Cesare Borgia in the Italian Renaissance

=== 1950s ===
- The Sound of Fury – 1950 film by Cy Endfield in which two kidnappers are lynched after a journalist's provocation, inspired by the 1933 Brooke Hart lynching case where the California Governor colluded with the mob
- The Gunfighter – 1950 Western by Henry King in which a notorious gunfighter is shot in the back by a tyro, for the sake of the fame
- Quo Vadis – 1951 film by Mervyn LeRoy, about the persecution of early Christians, involves the crucifixion of Saint Peter (in AD 64), then the murder of Empress Poppaea by Emperor Nero, and the mercy killing of Nero by his Christian friend Acte, inspired by the suicide of Nero in AD 68
- Murder in the Cathedral – 1951 film by George Hoellering about the assassination of Archbishop of Canterbury Thomas Becket in 1170, based on the play by T.S. Eliot
- The Desert Fox – 1951 film by Henry Hathaway, about Field Marshal Rommel, includes his failed assassination by British commandos in 1941 and his role in the Stauffenberg plot against Adolf Hitler
- The Tall Target – 1951 film by Anthony Mann about a conspiracy against Abraham Lincoln, known as the "Baltimore Plot", before his 1861 presidential inauguration
- The Magic Face – 1951 film by Frank Tuttle where an actor becomes Adolf Hitler's valet only to kill and replace him
- The Enforcer – 1951 film by Bretaigne Windust (and Raoul Walsh) about the Murder, Inc. group of professional hitmen

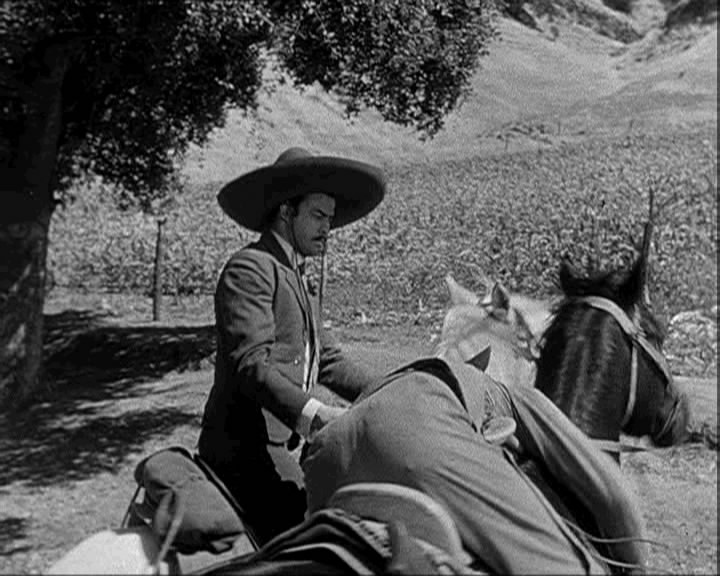
Marlon Brando as Emiliano Zapata, assassinated revolutionary

- Viva Zapata! – 1952 film by Elia Kazan about the murders of Francisco Madero and Emiliano Zapata during the Mexican Revolution
- The Secret People – 1952 film by Thorold Dickinson in which a plot to assassinate a European dictator goes awry, killing an innocent bystander
- Julius Caesar – 1953 film by Joseph L. Mankiewicz about the assassination of Julius Caesar in the Roman Senate on the Ides of March, 44 BC, adapted from Shakespeare's tragedy
- Lucrèce Borgia – 1953 French film directed by Christian-Jaque in which César Borgia plots the assassination of the Duke of Milan, the first husband of his sister Lucrèce, then plots again against her second husband, Alphonse of Aragon, in 1498
- Canaris – 1954 West German film by Alfred Weidenmann about how the assassination of Nazi Reinhard Heydrich in 1942 fails to prevent the arrest and execution of Abwehr chief and British agent Wilhelm Canaris in 1945
- Suddenly – 1954 film by Lewis Allen about a would-be presidential assassin
- Jackboot Mutiny – 1955 West German film by G.W. Pabst about the Stauffenberg plot against Adolf Hitler
- Prince of Players – 1955 film by Philip Dunne about the assassination of Abraham Lincoln by John Wilkes Booth
- The Plot to Assassinate Hitler – 1955 West German film by Falk Harnack about the Stauffenberg plot against Adolf Hitler
- Ernst Thälmann – Führer seiner Klasse – 1955 East German film by Kurt Maetzig in which Ernst Thälmann, German Communist Party leader, is murdered in Buchenwald in 1944
- Alexander the Great – 1956 film by Robert Rossen in which Alexander ascends the throne of Macedon after the assassination of King Philip in 336 BC.
- Nero's Weekend – 1956 Italian comedy by Steno in which mad Roman Emperor Nero tries over and over to assassinate his mother Agrippina, amongst others
- I Killed Wild Bill Hickok – 1956 Western by Richard Talmadge about the assassination of lawman Wild Bill Hickok in 1876, loosely based on the story of Hickok's assassin
- Anastasia – 1956 film by Anatole Litvak concerns a mysterious woman from a Parisian asylum who might be Russian Grand Duchess Anastasia, survivor of the murder of her family in 1918
- The Green Man – 1956 comedy by Robert Day and Basil Dearden about an assassin and a Cabinet minister
- The Man Who Knew Too Much – 1956 remake by Alfred Hitchcock about an American family on vacation in Morocco who become involved in an assassination plot
- Omar Khayyam – 1957 film by William Dieterle in which the poet Omar Khayyam foils a plot by the sect of Assassins to kill the sultan's son
- I Was Monty's Double – 1958 film by John Guillermin in which the actor (played in the film by the real person, actor M.E. Clifton-James) hired to impersonate British Field Marshal Montgomery is subject to German aeroplane and commando attacks
- Ivan the Terrible, Part II – 1958 Soviet film by Sergei Eisenstein about a plot by his boyars to assassinate Tsar Ivan IV, c. 1565
- Ashes and Diamonds – 1958 Polish film by Andrzej Wajda about two Home Army fighters ordered to assassinate a Communist commissar
- Ben-Hur – 1959 film by William Wyler in which a Jewish nobleman is sentenced to the galleys after a perceived assassination attempt on Valerius Gratus, the Roman Procurator of Judea
- North West Frontier – 1959 film by J. Lee Thompson, set in India in 1905, where a Hindu maharajah is assassinated by Moslem rebels and a British captain must defend his young heir

=== 1960s ===
- Esther and the King – 1960 film by Raoul Walsh and Mario Bava about Persian Queen Esther and her husband King Ahasuerus, based on the Book of Esther
- Khovanshchina – 1960 Soviet film by Vera Stroyeva, based on Mussorgsky's opera
- Murder, Inc. – 1960 film by Stuart Rosenberg about the Murder, Inc. group of professional hitmen
- The Gleiwitz Case – 1961 East German film by Gerhard Klein in which Nazis plan to murder a concentration camp inmate dressed in Polish uniform as a pretext to invade Poland, based on the 1939 Gleiwitz incident
- Vanina Vanini – 1961 Italian film by Roberto Rossellini, set in 1824 during the Risorgimento, when a Carbonari revolutionary plans to assassinate a traitor to the secret society, loosely based on the novella by Stendhal which does not involve assassination
- Blast of Silence – 1961 film by Allen Baron where a hitman stalks a mob lord during Christmas
- Shinobi no Mono – 1962 Japanese film by Satsuo Yamamoto in which two ninjas vie to assassinate warlord Oda Nobunaga in the 1570s
- Chushingura: Hana no Maki, Yuki no Maki – 1962 Japanese film by Hiroshi Inagaki about the Forty-seven Ronin, a group of samurai who plotted to avenge their lord's death in 1701
- The Manchurian Candidate – 1962 film by John Frankenheimer, adapted from the novel by Richard Condon, in which a U.S. Korean War POW is brainwashed into assassinating a Presidential candidate, thus allowing a Communist agent to become President
- Dr. No – 1962 thriller by Terence Young about the murder of British agents in Jamaica, and the investigation by an agent, James Bond, who is "licensed to kill"
- Cleopatra – 1963 film by Joseph L. Mankiewicz, about the Egyptian queen, includes the assassinations of several historical figures, Pompey, Pothinus, Julius Caesar, Caesarion and, unhistorically, Egyptian ambassador Sosigenes
- Nine Hours to Rama – 1963 film by Mark Robson about Mahatma Gandhi and his assassin
- The Ugly American – 1963 film by George Englund, in which a Southeast Asian nationalist revolutionary is assassinated by a Communist double agent
- The Little Soldier – 1963 French film by Jean-Luc Godard about an agent for French Intelligence who is assigned to kill a sympathizer of the Algerian FLN
- From Russia with Love – 1963 film by Terence Young in which James Bond and an ally are targeted for assassination by a SPECTRE agent
- Becket – 1964 film by Peter Glenville about the assassination of Archbishop of Canterbury Thomas Becket in 1170
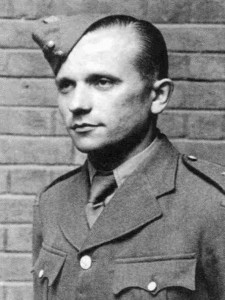
Jozef Gabčík, c. 1942

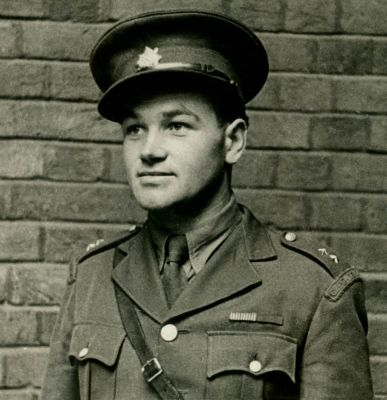
Jan Kubiš, c. 1942
Czech SOE agents who eliminated Reinhard Heydrich
- Atentát – 1964 Czechoslovak film by Jiří Sequens about the assassination of Nazi Reinhard Heydrich by Czech commandos in 1942
- The Trial of Lee Harvey Oswald – 1964 film by Larry Buchanan in which the accused assassin of U.S. President Kennedy is not himself assassinated but instead receives a fair trial in Dallas
- The Fall of the Roman Empire – 1964 film by Anthony Mann about the rumoured assassination of Marcus Aurelius in AD 180 and the actual one of Commodus in 192
- Behold a Pale Horse – 1964 film by Fred Zinnemann about a Spanish Civil War grudge between an exiled guerrilla and a policeman
- De l'assassinat considéré comme un des beaux-arts – 1964 French film by Maurice Boutel lists a role for a "President of Gentlemen Amateurs"
- Shaheed – 1965 Indian (Hindi) film by S. Ram Sharma about Indian nationalist Bhagat Singh and the assassination of British police superintendent J.P. Saunders in 1928
- Thunderball – 1965 film by Terence Young that opens with James Bond's first on-screen assassination, of an enemy agent
- The Intelligence Men – 1965 comedy by Robert Asher in which two Londoners foil an assassination plot at the ballet
- Harum Scarum – 1965 musical comedy by Gene Nelson in which a band of ancient Assassins want a singer to kill a desert king
- The Battle of Algiers – Oscar-nominated 1966 Italian film by Gillo Pontecorvo about political violence during the Algerian War
- Pharaoh – Oscar-nominated 1966 Polish film by Jerzy Kawalerowicz about the assassination of a reformist Egyptian pharaoh, adapted from the novel by Bolesław Prus, and eerily echoing the death of John F. Kennedy in 1963
- The Man Called Flintstone – 1966 animated thriller by William Hanna and Joseph Barbera in which Bedrock quarry employee and family man Fred Flintstone becomes the target of assassins when he takes the place of a out-of-action secret agent who looks exactly like him
- Our Man Flint – 1966 spoof by Daniel Mann in which a retired secret agent avoids assassination by mad scientists bent on world domination
- The Night of the Generals – 1967 thriller by Anatole Litvak indirectly about the Stauffenberg plot to assassinate Adolf Hitler

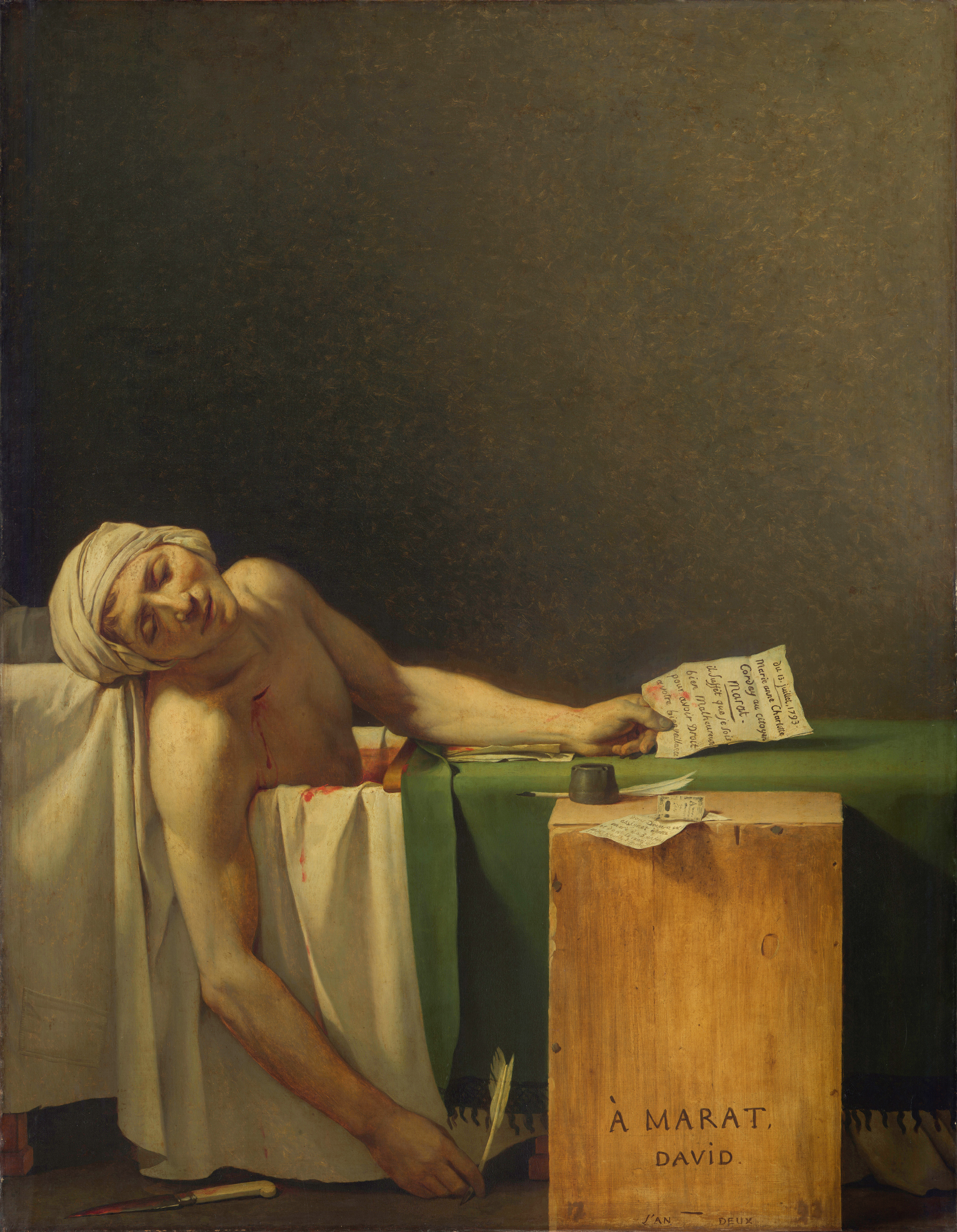
Assassination of Jean-Paul Marat, 1793

- Marat/Sade – 1967 film by Peter Brook in which the inmates of an insane asylum in 1808, under the direction of the Marquis de Sade, act out the assassination of Jean-Paul Marat in 1793, based the play by Peter Weiss
- The St. Valentine's Day Massacre – 1967 film by Roger Corman about the 1929 Saint Valentine's Day Massacre of members of the Moran gang by Capone gunmen
- Le Samouraï – 1967 French film by Jean-Pierre Melville about a remorseless hitman
- The President's Analyst – 1967 comedy by Theodore J. Flicker in which the U.S. President's personal psychiatrist must evade assassination attempts by U.S. government agencies, the "CEA" and the "FBR" [sic]
- You Only Live Twice – 1967 film by Lewis Gilbert that opens with James Bond being the target of a faked assassination
- The Caesars – 1968 ITV miniseries by Derek Bennett on political violence in ancient Rome, involving the murders of members of the Imperial family – Postumus, Germanicus, Drusus, "Castor", and others
- Sarajevski atentat – 1968 Yugoslav (Serbo-Croatian) film by Fadil Hadžić in which a World War II partisan in Sarajevo is told the events of 1914 with the assassination of Austrian Archduke Franz Ferdinand and his wife by a Young Bosnia nationalist
- If.... – Palme d'Or-winning 1968 film by Lindsay Anderson in which rebellious English public school students move to open revolt and assassinate their headmaster, inspired by the 1968 Paris riots and the 1605 Gunpowder Plot
- Nobody Runs Forever – 1968 film by Ralph Thomas in which an Australian policeman arrives in London and prevents the assassination of the Australian High Commissioner
- Che! – 1969 film by Richard Fleischer in which Argentine revolutionary Ernesto "Che" Guevara meets his death in Bolivia in 1967
- The Royal Hunt of the Sun – 1969 film by Irving Lerner, based on the play by Peter Shaffer, in which Inca Emperor Atahualpa meets his end in 1533 at the hands of Spanish conquistador Francisco Pizarro
- The Price of Power – 1969 spaghetti Western by Tonino Valerii depicting the assassination of President Garfield by a disappointed office seeker in 1881, fictionalized in the manner of the 1963 Kennedy assassination
- Z – Oscar-winning 1969 Algerian film by Costa-Gavras in which a magistrate struggles to prosecute the assassins of an opposition politician, based on the 1963 murder of Greek MP Gregoris Lambrakis
- Crossplot – 1969 film by Alvin Rakoff where an executive learns of a plot to assassinate a visiting African leader in London
- The Assassination Bureau – 1969 romp by Basil Dearden, set in Edwardian Europe, in which a journalist hires an assassination agency to kill the head of the agency itself, inspired by the much more serious novel by Jack London
- Burn! – 1969 film by Gillo Pontecorvo in which the revolutionary activities of a British agent on a Portuguese colonial island lead to assassination

=== 1970s ===
==== 1970–1974 ====
- Julius Caesar – 1970 film by Stuart Burge about the assassination of Julius Caesar in the Roman Senate on the Ides of March, 44 BC, adapted from Shakespeare's tragedy
- Little Big Man – 1970 revisionist Western by Arthur Penn, about a settler raised by Cheyenne Indians, includes the assassination of lawman Wild Bill Hickok in 1876
- The Conformist – 1970 film by Bernardo Bertolucci about a fascist assassin sent from Italy to assassinate his former professor in Paris.
- Nicholas and Alexandra – 1971 film by Franklin J. Schaffner where the assassinations of Pyotr Stolypin, Franz Ferdinand, and Rasputin precede the 1918 executions of Russian Tsar Nicholas II and his consort, Tsarina Alexandra
- Mihai Viteazul – 1971 Romanian film by Sergiu Nicolaescu, set during the Long War, about Prince Michael the Brave, ending with his 1601 murder by his ally, Habsburg general Giorgio Basta
- The Devils – 1971 film by Ken Russell about Urbain Grandier, a French priest opposed to Cardinal Richelieu, who is burnt at the stake in 1634 for witchcraft
- Get Carter – 1971 film by Mike Hodges where a London gangster in Newcastle avenges his brother's death before an assassin finds him
- Diamonds Are Forever – 1971 film by Guy Hamilton that opens with James Bond on a vendetta-driven assassination run against Ernst Stavro Blofeld
- The Assassination of Trotsky – 1972 film by Joseph Losey about the murder of Leon Trotsky by the mysterious "Jacson" in Mexico City in 1940
- Karl Liebknecht – Trotz alledem! – 1972 East German film by Günter Reisch in which Karl Liebknecht and Rosa Luxemburg, Spartacist League leaders, are murdered by Berlin Freikorps in 1919
- Sarajevski atentat – 1972 Yugoslav (Serbo-Croatian) television film by Arsenije Jovanović about the 1914 plot to assassinate Austrian Archduke Franz Ferdinand by a Young Bosnia nationalist and his co-conspirators
- State of Siege – 1972 French film by Costa-Gavras about the execution of a U.S. government torturer in Uruguay by Tupamaro guerrillas, based on the 1970 Dan Mitrione case
- Pope Joan – 1972 film by Michael Anderson about the lynching of Pope Joan, the legendary female English Pope, when her sex is discovered
- The Godfather – 1972 film by Francis Ford Coppola, based on the novel by Mario Puzo, in which the attempted assassination of a Mafia don leads to retaliation and further assassinations among Mafia families
- The Mechanic – 1972 film by Michael Winner about a hitman and his protégé
- Il delitto Matteotti – 1973 Italian film by Florestano Vancini about the assassination of Socialist leader Giacomo Matteotti in 1924 by the Ceka of Prime Minister Mussolini, who maintains the support of King Victor Emmanuel and strengthens his dictatorship
- The Day of the Jackal – 1973 film adaptation by Fred Zinnemann of the novel by Frederick Forsyth, where the assassin of Patrice Lumumba and Rafael Trujillo is assigned to kill Charles de Gaulle
- Executive Action – 1973 film by David Miller details a presumed conspiracy to assassinate John F. Kennedy, based on a 1966 bestseller by Mark Lane and subsequent 1967 documentary by Emile de Antonio
- Love and Anarchy – 1973 Italian film by Lina Wertmüller about a 1930s anarchist who prepares to assassinate Mussolini over the murder of a friend
- The Day of the Dolphin – 1973 science fiction film by Mike Nichols in which talking bottlenose dolphins are used in a plot to mine the U.S. President's yacht
- Sleeper – Hugo-winning 1973 science fiction comedy by Woody Allen, set in the year 2173, when rebels have killed a dictator, and a defrosted health food store owner from 1973 is sent to assassinate the dictator's only surviving part, his nose, before it can be cloned
- Theatre of Blood – 1973 film by Douglas Hickox in which an overacting Shakespearean actor assassinates his critics in the manner of Shakespeare's most grotesque murder scenes
- Scorpio – 1973 film by Michael Winner about a French assassin engaged by the CIA
- The Werewolf of Washington – 1973 horror satire by Milton Moses Ginsberg raises the question whether party loyalty is enough to protect the U.S. President when he hires a werewolf as his press secretary
- Live and Let Die – 1973 film by Guy Hamilton that opens with the assassinations of several British agents on the orders of Dr. Kananga, ruler of the fictional country of San Monique, later killed by James Bond – the first time 007 is shown assassinating the leader of a country
- Fall of Eagles – 1974 BBC miniseries by Bill Hays, David Cunliffe, et al. includes the assassinations of Vyacheslav von Plehve, Grand Duke Sergei and Archduke Franz Ferdinand
- Orders – Oscar-submitted 1974 French Canadian film by Michel Brault about mass arrests following the assassination of Quebec Labour Minister Pierre Laporte by FLQ terrorists during the 1970 October Crisis
- Agony: The Life and Death of Rasputin – 1974 Soviet film by Elem Klimov about the murdered monk, Rasputin
- The ODESSA File – 1974 film by Ronald Neame in which a West German journalist targets Edward Roschmann, industrialist and former SS commandant of Riga concentration camp
- The Parallax View – 1974 film by Alan J. Pakula about a reporter and assassination conspiracy theorist, and the murders of two U.S. senators, adapted from the novel by Loren Singer
- The Godfather Part II – 1974 film, the second part of the Godfather trilogy, written by Mario Puzo and Francis Ford Coppola, and directed by Coppola
- A Boy and His Dog – 1974 science fiction film by L. Q. Jones about a teenage girl who recruits a post-apocalyptic nomad to assassinate her town council as part of a coup
- The Man with the Golden Gun – 1974 film by Guy Hamilton that pits James Bond against the world's top assassin, Scaramanga

==== 1975–1979 ====
- Operation: Daybreak – 1975 film by Lewis Gilbert about the assassination of Nazi Reinhard Heydrich by Czech commandos in 1942
- The Day That Shook the World – Oscar-submitted 1975 Yugoslav-Czechoslovak (Serbo-Croatian) film by Veljko Bulajić about the 1914 assassination of Austrian Archduke Franz Ferdinand and his wife by a Young Bosnia nationalist

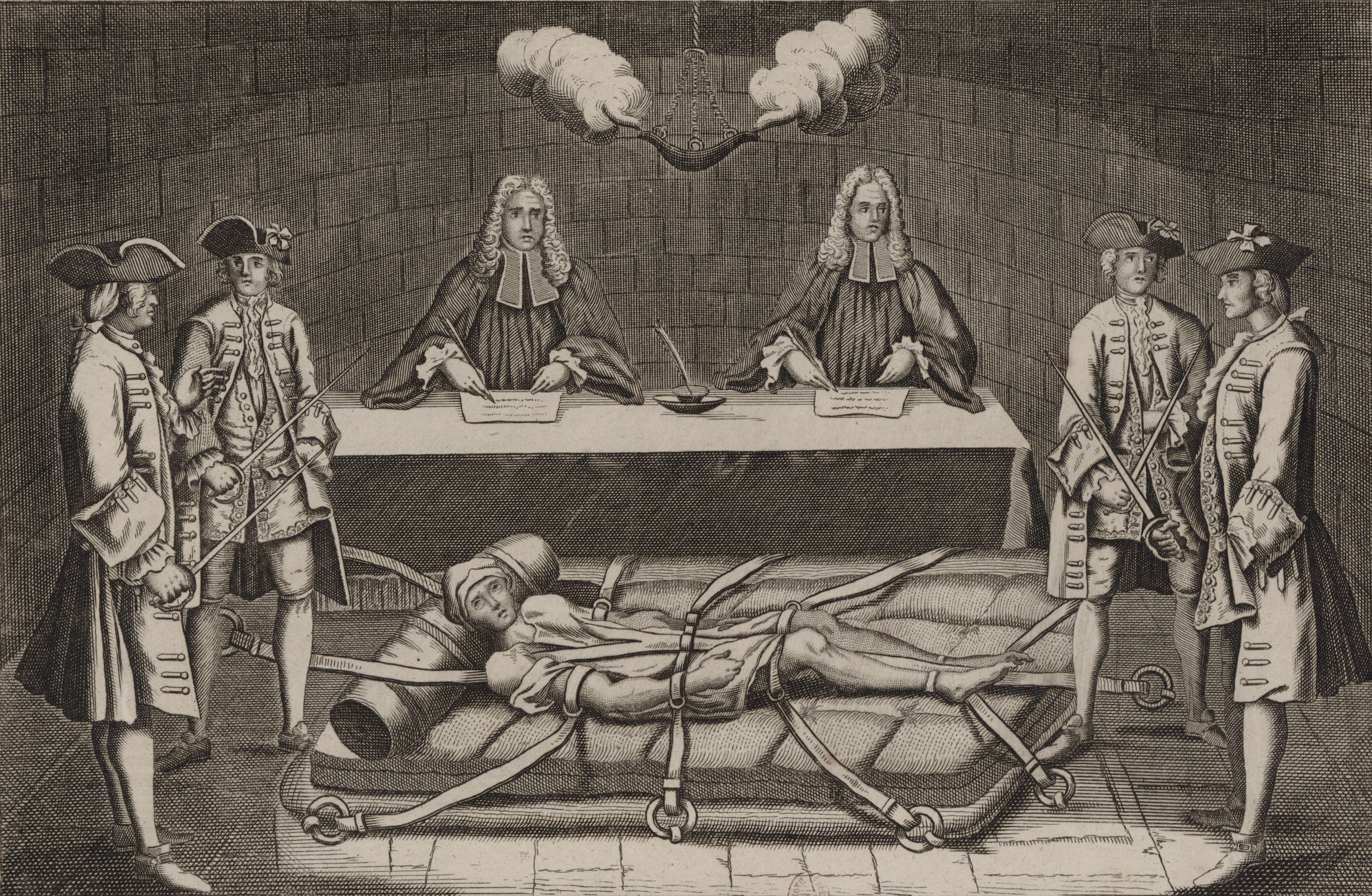
Attempted assassin Robert-François Damiens on trial, 1757

- Edward the Seventh – 1975 ITV miniseries by John Gorrie about Edward VII includes his attempted assassination by a teenaged anarchist in Brussels in 1900, as well as the off-screen assassination of Tsar Alexander II in 1881. The assassination of a daughter of Alexander Izvolsky is mentioned.
- Assassination in Davos – Oscar-submitted 1975 Swiss film by Rolf Lyssy about the assassination of Swiss Nazi leader Wilhelm Gustloff in 1936
- Hennessy – 1975 film by Don Sharp about an Irishman's plot to blow up Parliament in London
- Love and Death – 1975 satire by Woody Allen, set during the 1812 French invasion of Russia, in which a coward and his wife decide to assassinate Emperor Napoleon Bonaparte
- The Eiger Sanction – 1975 thriller by Clint Eastwood in which a professor and reluctant assassin must determine his target on a mountainside in the midst of a climbing expedition, from the novel by Trevanian
- Linda Lovelace for President – 1975 film by Claudio Guzmán where pornographic film actress Linda Lovelace (as herself) tries to screw her way to the U.S. Presidency, but becomes the target of her opponents' "Assassinator"
- Three Days of the Condor – 1975 film by Sydney Pollack about assassins working for an unauthorized Black ops program who target a lone CIA analyst after wiping out his entire division
- The Last of Mrs. Lincoln – 1976 television film by George Schaefer about the aftermath of the 1865 Lincoln assassination
- Il pleut sur Santiago – 1976 French film by Helvio Soto about the CIA-backed coup against Chilean President Salvador Allende in 1973
- All the President's Men – 1976 film by Alan J. Pakula, about the exposure of the Watergate scandal, mentions Arthur Bremer's 1972 assassination attempt against candidate George Wallace as well as threats in his diary directed against Pres. Nixon
- I, Claudius – 1976 BBC miniseries by Herbert Wise on political violence in ancient Rome, involving the murders of members of the Imperial family – Marcellus, Agrippa, Gaius, Lucius, the Emperor Augustus (poisoned by his wife Livia), Postumus, Germanicus, "Castor", "Helen", Drusus and Nero, Livilla, the Emperor Tiberius, Gemellus, Drusilla and fœtus, the Emperor Caligula, Caesonia and Julia Drusilla, Messalina, the Emperor Claudius, Britannicus, Agrippinilla – and others
- Eleanor and Franklin – 1976 ABC miniseries by Daniel Petrie covers the period of the 1933 attempted assassination of President-elect Franklin D. Roosevelt by a delusional anarchist
- Rogue Male – 1976 BBC television film by Clive Donner, based on Geoffrey Household's 1939 novel, Rogue Male.
- The Eagle Has Landed – 1976 film by John Sturges about a German plot, initially, to capture Winston Churchill
- Taxi Driver – Palme d'Or-winning 1976 film by Martin Scorsese in which a confused loner tries to assassinate a U.S. Senator and presidential candidate
- Helter Skelter – 1976 television film by Tom Gries about the Charles Manson Family murders, the Family including Squeaky Fromme, would-be 1975 assassin of President Ford
- The Next Man – 1976 film by Richard C. Sarafian in which a Saudi minister who wants peace with Israel faces a series of assassination attempts from terrorists
- Target of an Assassin – 1976 film by Peter Collinson in which a South African male nurse kidnaps the hospitalized target of a failed assassination, a visiting African President

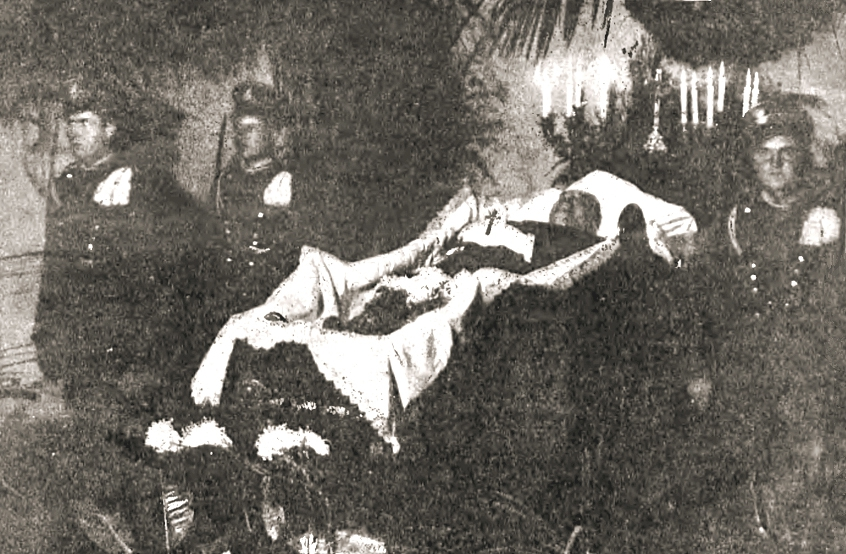
Gabriel Narutowicz, assassinated 1922

- Death of a President – 1977 Polish film by Jerzy Kawalerowicz about the 1922 assassination of Polish President Gabriel Narutowicz
- The Lincoln Conspiracy – 1977 television film by James L. Conway that details a presumed conspiracy of Radical Republicans, led by Secretary of War Stanton, to assassinate President Lincoln in 1865
- The Trial of Lee Harvey Oswald – 1977 TV miniseries by Gordon Davidson and David Greene in which the accused assassin of U.S. President Kennedy is placed on trial in Texas before his own assassination by Jack Ruby
- Black Sunday – 1977 film by John Frankenheimer about a terrorist plot to detonate a blimp bomb over the Super Bowl football game with the U.S. President in attendance
- The Strange Case of the End of Civilization as We Know It – 1977 comedy by Joseph McGrath which involves "Sherlock Holmes" in the murders of the U.S. Secretary of State and various police officials
- The Spy Who Loved Me – 1977 James Bond film by Lewis Gilbert that features the debut of a steel-toothed assassin named Jaws
- King – 1978 NBC miniseries by Abby Mann depicts the 1965 murder of civil rights worker Viola Liuzzo, as well as the 1958 near fatal stabbing, by a deranged woman, and 1968 assassination of Martin Luther King Jr.
- Brass Target – 1978 film by John Hough about a plan in 1945 to assassinate Gen. Patton over his investigation of a theft of Reichsbank gold by U.S. Army officers
- Ruby and Oswald—1978 TV film which has Lee Harvey Oswald assassinate U.S. President Kennedy
- Foul Play – 1978 comedy-thriller by Colin Higgins involving a plot to assassinate the Pope in San Francisco
- Who Is Killing the Great Chefs of Europe? – 1978 comedy by Ted Kotcheff, in which European gourmet chefs are being served up like their greatest dishes
- Operación Ogro – 1979 Spanish film by Gillo Pontecorvo about the operation of the same name, targeting Luis Carrero Blanco, Franco's Prime Minister, by ETA bombers in 1973
- 22 June 1897 – 1979 Indian (Marathi) film by Jayoo Patwardhan and Nachiket Patwardhan about the 1897 assassinations of plague-control officers, Charles Walter Rand and Charles Egerton Ayerst, in British India
- Roots: The Next Generations – 1979 ABC miniseries, by John Erman et al., based on the book by Alex Haley, includes the assassination of black nationalist Malcolm X and features an interview with a figure later assassinated, American Nazi leader George Lincoln Rockwell
- Caligula – controversial 1979 film produced by Bob Guccione about the assassination of insane Roman Emperor Caligula and his immediate family in AD 41
- Breakthrough – 1979 sequel by Andrew V. McLaglen in which German Army Sgt. Steiner from Cross of Iron becomes involved in a plot against Hitler
- I as in Icarus – 1979 French film by Henri Verneuil where a committee in a fictitious country, after their President's assassination, settles on a lone gunman, but a single investigator is dissatisfied
- Apocalypse Now – Palme d'Or-winning 1979 film by Francis Ford Coppola, set during the Vietnam War, loosely inspired by Joseph Conrad's Heart of Darkness, in which a US Army captain is sent to assassinate a rogue US Army colonel
- Winter Kills – 1979 film adapted from the novel by Richard Condon

=== 1980s ===
==== 1980–1984 ====
- Guyana Tragedy: The Story of Jim Jones – 1980 television film by William A. Graham about the murder of Congressman Leo Ryan by cult leader Jim Jones prior to the mass suicide in 1978
- The Ordeal of Dr. Mudd – 1980 television film by Paul Wendkos about the imprisonment of Dr. Samuel Mudd, following the Lincoln assassination in 1865
- The Blood of Hussain – 1980 Pakistani (Urdu) film by Jamil Dehlavi about the martyrdom of Imam Hussain in A.D. 680 (61 A.H.)
- Tom Horn – 1980 Western by William Wiard about Tom Horn, a gun for hire in 1890s Wyoming
- The Dogs of War – 1980 film by John Irvin in which a mercenary plans to kill a fictional African dictator in the course of a coup d'état
- The Kidnapping of the President – 1980 film by George Mendeluk in which the U.S. President is kidnapped by a South American terrorist and sealed in an armoured car wired to explode
- Cuba Crossing – 1980 film by Chuck Workman involving a plot against Fidel Castro
- Death of a Prophet – 1981 film by Woodie King Jr. about the 1965 assassination of black nationalist Malcolm X
- Rise and Fall of Idi Amin – 1981 film by Sharad Patel in which Ugandan President Idi Amin eliminates those he dislikes
- Teheran 43 – 1981 Franco-Soviet film by Aleksandr Alov and Vladimir Naumov about a German plot to assassinate Churchill, Roosevelt and Stalin as they attend the Tehran Conference in 1943
- Escape from New York – 1981 science fiction film by John Carpenter, set at the end of World War III, in which the inmates of the prison island of Manhattan threaten their hostage, the mutilated U.S. President, with death
- Blow Out – 1981 film directed by Brian De Palma about a sound engineer who is earwitness to a political assassination
- The Amateur – 1981 film by Charles Jarrott about a CIA cryptographer who trains as an assassin after the terrorist death of his fiancée
- Gandhi – 1982 film by Richard Attenborough about Mahatma Gandhi and his 1948 assassination by a Hindu extremist
- The Blue and the Gray – 1982 CBS miniseries by Andrew V. McLaglen includes the death of U.S. President Lincoln in 1865
- Missing – Palme d'Or-winning 1982 film by Costa-Gavras about the CIA-backed coup against Chilean President Salvador Allende in 1973, and the disappearance of a U.S. journalist, based on Charles Horman
- La passante du Sans-Souci – 1982 French film by Jacques Rouffio in which a humanitarian kills the ambassador of Paraguay, a former Nazi
- Harry's Game – 1982 ITV miniseries by Lawrence Gordon Clark in which a British soldier goes undercover in Belfast to track down the IRA assassin of a cabinet minister
- Under Fire – 1983 film by Roger Spottiswoode about the Somoza regime in 1979 Nicaragua, involving the assassination of a rebel leader
- For Us the Living: The Medgar Evers Story – 1983 television film by Michael Schulz about assassinated civil rights leader Medgar Evers
- Sadat – 1983 CBS miniseries by Richard Michaels about Egyptian President and Nobel laureate Anwar Sadat, assassinated along with other dignitaries in 1981 by Islamic extremists
- Reilly, Ace of Spies – 1983 ITV miniseries by Jim Goddard and Martin Campbell about a plot against Lenin involving British spy Sidney Reilly, executed by the OGPU in 1925, and a model for Ian Fleming's spy James Bond
- Al-Mas' Ala Al-Kubra – 1983 Iraqi film by Mohamed Shukri Jameel about the murder of British military governor Gerard Leachman near Fallujah in 1920
- Silkwood – 1983 film by Mike Nichols about the mysterious 1974 death of Karen Silkwood, a whistleblowing nuclear plant employee
- Jaane Bhi Do Yaaro – 1983 Indian (Hindi) film directed by Kundan Shah, a dark satirical comedy involving the assassination of a mayor.
- Never Say Never Again – 1983 film by Irvin Kershner in which James Bond faces a female SPECTRE assassin
- Down on Us – 1984 film by Larry Buchanan which argues that Jimi Hendrix, Jim Morrison, and Janis Joplin were assassinated by the U.S. government
- The Ambassador – 1984 film by J. Lee Thompson in which the U.S. ambassador to Israel is saved from assassination by his security chief
- Protocol – 1984 comedy by Herbert Ross where the assassination of an Arab emir is stopped by a waitress
- The Glory Boys – 1984 television film by Michael Ferguson in which the IRA aids a PLO terrorist in a hit on an Israeli nuclear scientist
- Dune – 1984 science fiction film by David Lynch in which Duke Leto fails in his attempt to assassinate Baron Harkonnen on the planet Arrakis

==== 1985–1989 ====
- Hitler's SS: Portrait in Evil – 1985 television film by Jim Goddard about Nazi Germany, including the Night of the Long Knives in 1934
- Dawn – 1985 film by Miklós Jancsó about the murder of a British officer by Zionist terrorists, based on the novel by Nobel laureate Elie Wiesel
- Rosa Luxemburg – 1986 West German film by Margarethe von Trotta in which Karl Liebknecht and Rosa Luxemburg, Spartacist League leaders, are murdered by Berlin Freikorps in 1919
- Lady Jane – 1986 film by Trevor Nunn about the execution of English queen Lady Jane Grey in 1554
- Shaka Zulu – 1986 SABC miniseries and 1987 film by William C. Faure about the murder of Zulu king Shaka by his brothers at Dukuza in 1828
- Night of the Pencils – 1986 Argentine film by Héctor Olivera about a group of student activists tortured then killed over the cost of bus fare, in 1976 during the Dirty War period
- Sword of Gideon – 1986 CTV miniseries by Michael Anderson about the hunt for those purportedly involved in the 1972 Munich massacre
- North and South, Book II – 1986 miniseries by Kevin Connor includes a fictional 1864 plot to overthrow and kill President Jefferson Davis of the Confederate States of America
- The Assault – Oscar-winning 1986 Dutch film by Fons Rademakers about the consequences for an average family after the assassination of a Nazi collaborator, based on the novel by Harry Mulisch
- Cry Freedom – 1987 film by Richard Attenborough about the murder of South African activist Steve Biko in 1977
- Vuk Karadžić – 1987 Yugoslav (Serbo-Croatian) RTB miniseries created by Milovan Vitezović about Vuk Karadžić, the Serbian language reformer, includes several assassinations, the Slaughter of the Dukes in 1804, Vožd Karadjordje Petrović in 1817, and Prince Mihailo Obrenović in 1868
- Matewan – 1987 film by John Sayles where labour unrest in West Virginia builds to the 1920 Battle of Matewan, with the death of mayor Cabell Testerman, and the 1921 assassination of police chief Sid Hatfield
- Aria – 1987 film by Nicolas Roeg in which Albanian King Zog survives an assassination attempt in 1931
- Assassination – 1987 film by Peter R. Hunt about a Secret Service agent who must defend the obnoxious wife of the about-to-be-inaugurated U.S. President
- Hour of the Assassin – 1987 film by Luis Llosa in which a man is tricked into trying to assassinate a newly elected Latin American president
- Jäähyväiset presidentille (Farewell, Mr. President) – 1987 Finnish film by Matti Kassila about a tall poppy syndromed waiter who plans to assassinate the President of Finland
- The Living Daylights – 1987 film by John Glen in which James Bond is assigned to kill an enemy sniper assassin

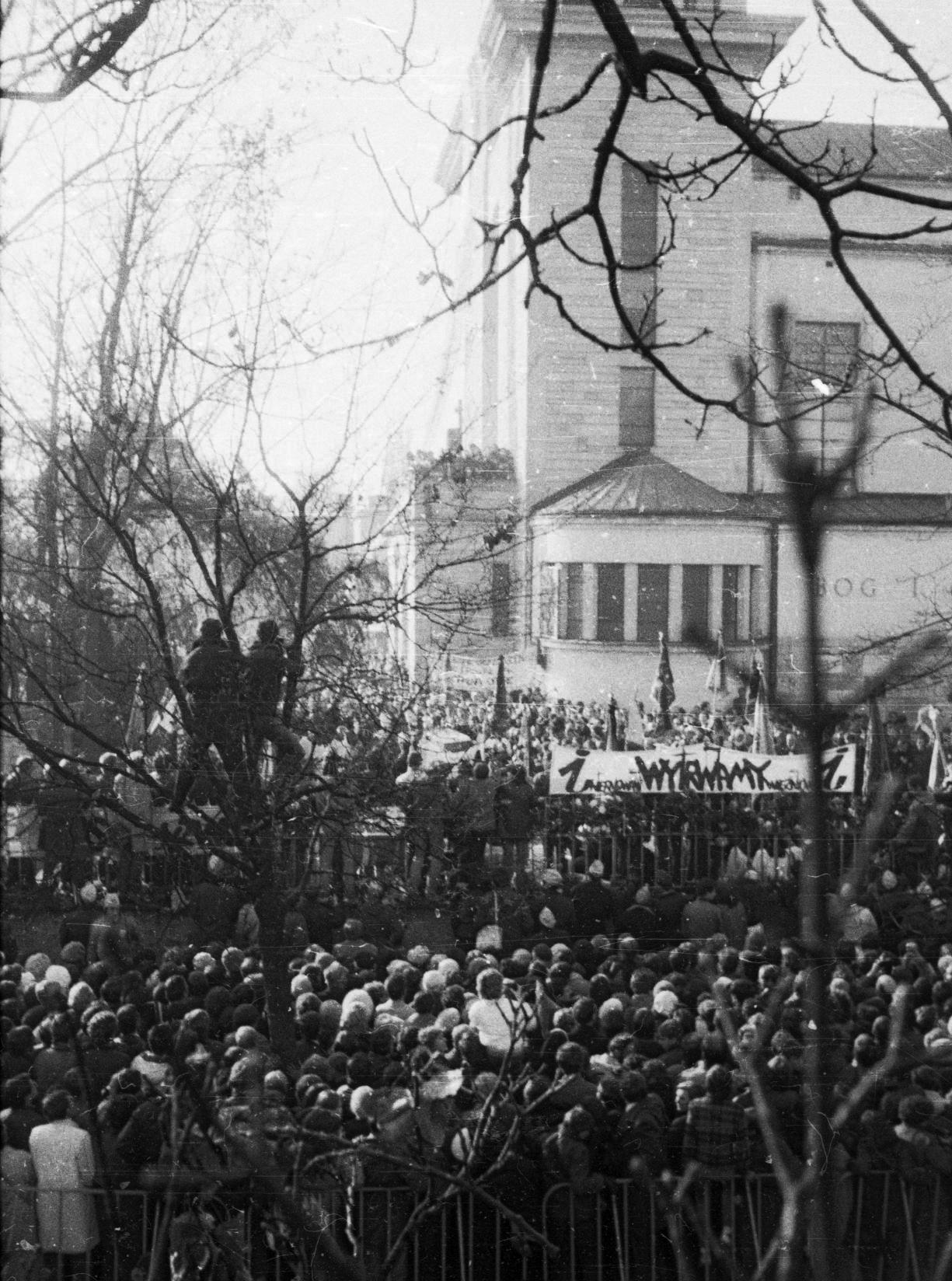
Funeral of Jerzy Popiełuszko, assassinated 1984

- To Kill a Priest – 1988 film by Agnieszka Holland where a Polish secret policeman is sent to kill an outspoken priest, based on the 1984 assassination of Jerzy Popiełuszko
- Mississippi Burning – 1988 film by Alan Parker about the murders of Chaney, Goodman, and Schwerner in 1964
- Talk Radio – 1988 film by Oliver Stone about a provocative, "shock jock" radio host goading his audience to violence, inspired by the murder of Denver broadcaster Alan Berg in 1984
- Betrayed – 1988 film by Costa-Gavras about an FBI investigation into white supremacists after the death of a Jewish radio host, inspired by the murder of Denver broadcaster Alan Berg in 1984
- The Murder of Mary Phagan – 1988 NBC miniseries by William Hale about the lynching of Jewish factory owner Leo Frank in 1915
- A Dangerous Life – 1988 HBO miniseries by Robert Markowitz, about how the assassination of Benigno Aquino in Manila in 1983 led finally to the downfall of Philippine President Ferdinand Marcos
- A World Apart – 1988 film by Chris Menges commemorates a South African anti-apartheid activist based on Ruth First, assassinated by mail bomb in 1982
- Gorillas in the Mist – 1988 film by Michael Apted in which the mock execution of a poacher precedes the murder of U.S. primatologist Dian Fossey, in Rwanda in 1985
- The Naked Gun – 1988 comedy by David Zucker about a plot to have baseball player Reggie Jackson assassinate Queen Elizabeth II
- Romero – 1989 film by John Duigan about the murders of Salvadoran priest Rutilio Grande in 1977, then Archbishop Óscar Romero in 1980
- Rojo amanecer – 1989 Mexican film by Jorge Fons about the 1968 Tlatelolco massacre of student activists by President Díaz Ordaz
- The Revenge of Al Capone – 1989 television film by Michael Pressman in which mobster Al Capone plans the assassination of Chicago Mayor Cermak, based on a revisionist interpretation of the 1933 attempted murder of President-elect Roosevelt by a delusional anarchist
- Red Scorpion – 1989 film by Joseph Zito, scripted by convicted criminal Jack Abramoff, about a KGB agent sent to kill an African anti-Communist rebel leader, inspired by Angola's Jonas Savimbi
- Licence to Kill – 1989 film by John Glen in which James Bond goes rogue and plans the assassination of a drug dealer who maimed a close friend

=== 1990s ===
==== 1990–1994 ====
- The Plot to Kill Hitler – 1990 film by Lawrence Schiller about the Stauffenberg plot against Adolf Hitler
- Murder in Mississippi – 1990 television film by Roger Young about the murders of Chaney, Goodman, and Schwerner in 1964
- Sandino – 1990 film by Chilean director Miguel Littín about Nicaraguan revolutionary Augusto Sandino, assassinated by future dictator Anastasio Somoza García in 1934
- A Show of Force – 1990 film by Bruno Barreto about the assassination of two Puerto Rican nationalists by FBI agents, aided by a local agent provocateur, based on the 1978 Cerro Maravilla Incident
- Drug Wars: The Camarena Story – 1990 NBC miniseries by Brian Gibson about U.S. DEA agent Enrique Camarena, murdered in Guadalajara, Mexico in 1985
- International Guerillas – 1990 Pakistani (Urdu) film by Jan Mohammed in which three brothers plan to assassinate British novelist and "Israeli agent" [sic] Salman Rushdie over his book The Satanic Verses
- Captain America – 1990 science fiction film by Albert Pyun in which the Red Skull, who failed to kill President Franklin D. Roosevelt during World War II, but succeeded in assassinating John F. Kennedy, Martin Luther King Jr. and Robert F. Kennedy, now targets the newly elected U.S. president
- Running Against Time – 1990 science fiction film by Bruce Seth Green where a time-travelling history professor tries to prevent the 1963 assassination of President Kennedy and avert the Vietnam War
- La Femme Nikita – 1990 French film directed by Luc Besson concerning Nikita, who is convicted of murder. In prison, she is injected with drugs, simulating death. Officially dead, she is given the choice of either working for the DGSE as an assassin or being killed for real
- The Godfather Part III – 1990 film, the final part of the Godfather trilogy, written by Mario Puzo and Francis Ford Coppola, and directed by Coppola
- Fatal Mission – 1990 film by George Rowe in which a CIA agent plays the role of reporter in order to assassinate a North Vietnamese general
- JFK – 1991 film by Oliver Stone about a grand conspiracy to implicate Lee Harvey Oswald as the assassin of President Kennedy
- Edward II – 1991 film by Derek Jarman about the murder of English King Edward II in 1327
- Year of the Gun – 1991 film by John Frankenheimer about the death of former Italian Prime Minister Aldo Moro in 1978
- Bugsy – 1991 film by Barry Levinson, where mobster Bugsy Siegel, heavily romanticized, gets whacked in 1947
- In Broad Daylight – 1991 television film by James Steven Sadwith in which a brutal town bully is finally murdered by frightened townspeople, based on the 1981 Ken McElroy case
- The Pope Must Die – 1991 comedy by Peter Richardson where an honest Pope, one not controlled by the Mafia, is accidentally elected, so he must be eliminated
- The Last Boy Scout – 1991 film by Tony Scott about a former Secret Service agent, saviour of Pres. Carter, foils a plot against a U.S. Senator
- Star Trek VI: The Undiscovered Country – 1991 science fiction film by Nicholas Meyer in which Captain Kirk is falsely accused of assassinating the Klingon chancellor.
- Stalin – 1992 television film by Ivan Passer in which Joseph Stalin eliminates former friends and associates like Sergei Kirov, Grigory Zinoviev, Lev Kamenev, Nikolai Bukharin, Genrikh Yagoda, Nikolai Yezhov, and Leon Trotsky during the Great Purge
- Malcolm X – 1992 film by Spike Lee about black nationalist Malcolm X, involving his father's suspicious death in 1931 and his own assassination in 1965
- Ruby – 1992 film by John Mackenzie about Dallas nightclub owner Jack Ruby, the killer of the presumed assassin of John F. Kennedy
- Bob Roberts – 1992 satire by Tim Robbins about a corrupt Senatorial candidate who organizes his own phoney assassination and subsequent simulated paralysis
- El Mariachi – 1992 U.S. (Spanish) film by Robert Rodriguez about an unemployed musician in Mexico who is targeted by hitmen
- In the Line of Fire – 1993 film by Wolfgang Petersen about an attempted assassination of an American president; Clint Eastwood plays a Secret Service agent who had been in the detail guarding President Kennedy in Dallas on 22 November 1963.
- Once Upon a Time in China III – 1993 Hong Kong film by Tsui Hark in which martial artist Wong Fei Hung helps to foil the assassination of Viceroy Li Hung-chang by a Russian diplomat
- Sniper – 1993 film by Luis Llosa about a U.S. Marine sniper targeting a drug lord in Panama
- Point of No Return – 1993 film directed by John Badham, also known as The Assassin; a remake of Nikita.
- Octobre – 1994 French Canadian film by Pierre Falardeau about the assassination of Quebec Labour Minister Pierre Laporte by FLQ terrorists during the 1970 October Crisis
- Doomsday Gun – 1994 television film by Robert Young about the assassination of Canadian long-range artillery expert Gerald Bull in 1990
- Bandit Queen – 1994 Indian (Hindi) film by Shekhar Kapur about outlaw Phoolan Devi, who was assassinated later, in 2001, in revenge for a past crime
- 47 Ronin – 1994 Japanese film by Kon Ichikawa about the Forty-seven Ronin, a group of samurai who plotted to avenge their lord's death in 1701
- Barcelona – 1994 comedy by Whit Stillman includes an assassination attempt on a U.S. Navy officer by Spanish nationalists
- Léon: The Professional – 1994 film by Luc Besson about a hitman who defends a young girl from corrupt DEA agents

==== 1995–1999 ====
- Kingfish: A Story of Huey P. Long – 1995 television film by Thomas Schlamme about the 1935 assassination of Louisiana governor Huey Long
- Nixon – 1995 film by Oliver Stone in which Pres. Nixon discusses U.S. government-sponsored assassination attempts directed at Fidel Castro – the corresponding imagery, but not dialogue, also includes Patrice Lumumba and Salvador Allende – later, Nixon and his aides fantasize about assassinating Daniel Ellsberg (over The Pentagon Papers)
- Wild Bill – 1995 revisionist Western by Walter Hill about the assassination of lawman Wild Bill Hickok in 1876
- The Shooter – 1995 film by Ted Kotcheff where, after the murder of the Cuban ambassador to the U.N., a CIA agent must prevent the lesbian assassin from disrupting a U.S.–Cuba summit
- Assassins – 1995 film by Richard Donner about the rivalry between a seasoned hitman and an upstart
- GoldenEye – 1995 film by Martin Campbell that features a female assassin and pits James Bond against a fellow agent gone rogue
- Ghosts of Mississippi – 1996 film by Rob Reiner about the trial of the assassin of civil rights leader Medgar Evers
- My Fellow Americans – 1996 comedy-thriller by Peter Segal in which two feuding former U.S. Presidents are hunted by NSA agents under orders from the current Vice-President
- George Wallace – 1997 television film by John Frankenheimer about Alabama governor George Wallace and his failed assassination in 1972
- The Assignment – 1997 film by Christian Duguay in which the CIA has a U.S. Navy officer impersonate terrorist Carlos the Jackal so that the KGB will assassinate the genuine Carlos
- Sharpe's Waterloo – 1997 television film by Tom Clegg in which Lt. Col. Sharpe fails to kill his commanding officer, the Dutch crown prince William, Prince of Orange, for cowardice at the 1815 Battle of Waterloo
- The Jackal – 1997 quasi-remake (of The Day of the Jackal) by Michael Caton-Jones where Russian gangsters dispatch an international assassin to kill the FBI Director, and the agency seeks aid from an Irish terrorist and a Basque separatist, but the actual target is discovered to be the wife of the U.S. President
- Air Force One – 1997 film by Wolfgang Petersen in which Russian neo-nationalists take over the U.S. President's plane, and execute White House staff, leaving the President to fight to regain control
- The Peacekeeper – 1997 film by Frédéric Forestier in which a USAF officer must foil the assassination of the U.S. President
- Shadow Conspiracy – 1997 film by George P. Cosmatos about an aide who uncovers a plot against the U.S. President
- A Further Gesture – 1997 film by Robert Dornhelm where an IRA hitman in New York City helps Guatemalan friends with their assassination plot
- Conspiracy Theory – 1997 film by Richard Donner in which a disturbed, conspiracy-obsessed cab driver discovers he is a CIA assassin
- The Informant – 1997 film by Jim McBride where an IRA man becomes a 'supergrass' after being caught trying to assassinate a judge
- Grosse Pointe Blank – 1997 comedy by George Armitage about a depressed professional assassin at his high school reunion
- Assassin(s) – 1997 French film by Mathieu Kassovitz about two professional killers, older mentoring younger
- The Man Who Knew Too Little – 1997 spoof by Jon Amiel, where an American on vacation in England who is mistaken for a hitman involved in an assassination plot
- Anastasia – 1997 animated musical by Don Bluth in which Russian Grand Duchess Anastasia survives the murder of her family only to face assassination by the demonically-resurrected monk Rasputin and his friend, an albino bat
- The Last Contract – Swedish film from 1998 that presents its own theory about the assassination of the Prime Minister of Sweden Olof Palme
- The Day Lincoln Was Shot – 1998 television film by John Gray about Good Friday, 1865 and the assassination plots directed at President Lincoln, Vice President Johnson and Secretary of State Seward
- The Terrorist – 1998 Indian (Tamil) film by Santosh Sivan about a young woman assigned to assassinate a South Asian leader, based on the death of Indian PM Rajiv Gandhi in Tamil Nadu in 1991
- Jinnah – 1998 film by Jamil Dehlavi in which Muhammad Ali Jinnah, the founder of Pakistan, survives an assassination attempt by a Moslem extremist
- Elizabeth – 1998 film by Shekhar Kapur, where Elizabeth I avoids an assassination planned by the Duke of Norfolk in favour of Mary, Queen of Scots, inspired by the 1570 Ridolfi Plot
- Bulworth – 1998 comedy by Warren Beatty about a suicidal U.S. Senator who pays for his own assassination
- Ronin – 1998 film by John Frankenheimer about mercenaries hired to obtain a briefcase from its courier, and the murder of a figure skater
- Go to Hell – 1999 comedy by Michael J. Heagle where a tabloid newspaper journalist can recover his soul only by assassinating a Catholic cardinal with demonic connections
- Ghost Dog: The Way of the Samurai – 1999 film by Jim Jarmusch about a Mafia hitman who follows the code of the samurai, inspired by Le Samouraï
- The World Is Not Enough – 1999 film by Michael Apted in which James Bond is assigned to retaliate for the assassination of a business tycoon within MI6 headquarters

=== 2000s ===
==== 2000–2002 ====
- The Romanovs: A Crowned Family – 2000 film by Gleb Panfilov about the 1918 execution of Russian Tsar Nicholas II, his consort, Tsarina Alexandra, and their family and retainers
- Lumumba – 2000 film by Haitian director Raoul Peck about the overthrow and murder of Congolese Prime Minister Patrice Lumumba in 1961
- Hey Ram – 2000 Indian (Tamil) film by Kamal Haasan about a plot to assassinate Mahatma Gandhi
- When the Sky Falls – 2000 film by John Mackenzie about the murder of an Irish reporter by a Dublin drug gang, based on the 1996 Veronica Guerin case
- Mission Kashmir – 2000 Indian (Hindi) film by Vidhu Vinod Chopra in which a plan by Kashmiri terrorists to assassinate the Indian PM proves to be only a ruse
- Chain of Command – 2000 TV film by John Terlesky in which the U.S. President is kidnapped, along with his means for launching a nuclear onslaught
- Miss Congeniality – 2000 comedy by Donald Petrie about an FBI agent who exposes a plot to blow up a newly crowned beauty pageant winner
- Kandahar – 2001 Franco-Iranian (Dari) film by Mohsen Makhmalbaf, about an exile's return to Afghanistan; stars Dawud Salahuddin who, in real life, was an American-born assassin for Iranian intelligence
- O Processo dos Távoras – 2001 Portuguese RTP miniseries by Wilson Solon about the trial of members of the nobility accused in the attempted assassination of Portuguese King Joseph I in 1758
- Ayyam El Sadat – 2001 Egyptian film by Mohamed Khan about Egyptian President and Nobel laureate Anwar Sadat, assassinated along with other dignitaries in 1981 by Islamic extremists
- In the Time of the Butterflies – 2001 film by Mariano Barroso, about the 1960 murders of the three Mirabal sisters for their opposition to Dominican dictator Rafael Trujillo
- Quo Vadis – 2001 Polish remake by Jerzy Kawalerowicz, about the persecution of early Christians
- The Day Reagan Was Shot – 2001 television film by Cyrus Nowrasteh in which U.S. President Reagan and press secretary Brady are seriously wounded in a failed assassination in 1981
- Zoolander – 2001 comedy by Ben Stiller in which a vacuous male model is programmed to kill the Malaysian Prime Minister – banned in Malaysia
- 2009: Lost Memories – 2002 South Korean film by Lee Si-myung in which An Jung-geun's assassination attempt against Itō Hirobumi in 1909 is thwarted, resulting in a time paradox where the Empire of Japan retains its overseas territories after World War II.
- The Sum of All Fears 2002 thriller in which Fascists plot to trigger a Third World War by framing the Russian Republic for nuking a championship football game attended by the U.S. President.
- Hero – 2002 Chinese film by Zhang Yimou centred on the assassination attempt directed at Qin Shi Huang, then King of Qin, by an enemy agent in 227 BC
- Frida – 2002 film by Julie Taymor about Mexican painter Frida Kahlo involves both Soviet exile Leon Trotsky and his original, failed, assassin David Alfaro Siqueiros, world-renowned mural painter and Stalinist
- RFK – 2002 television film by Robert Dornhelm about the life of U.S. politician Robert F. Kennedy from the assassination of his brother in 1963 to his own in 1968
- Trudeau – 2002 CBC miniseries by Jerry Ciccoritti about Canadian PM Trudeau, including the 1970 October Crisis and the assassination of Pierre Laporte
- The Dancer Upstairs – 2002 film by John Malkovich where the terrorist assassinations of government officials are investigated by a Latin American policeman in spite of the imposition of martial law, inspired by the 1992 capture of the leader of Peru's Sendero Luminoso
- The Legend of Bhagat Singh – 2002 Indian (Hindi) film by Rajkumar Santoshi about Indian nationalist Bhagat Singh and the assassination of British police superintendent J.P. Saunders in 1928
- 23 March 1931: Shaheed – 2002 Indian (Hindi) film by Guddu Dhanoa about Indian nationalist Bhagat Singh and the assassination of British police superintendent J.P. Saunders in 1928
- Interview with the Assassin – 2002 mock documentary written and directed by Neil Burger, purportedly about the "second gunman" at the John F. Kennedy assassination.
- Nothing So Strange – 2002 film, directed by Brian Flemming in the style of an "independent documentary", centring on the fictional assassination of Microsoft's Bill Gates (which occurs before the end of the opening credits) and resonating with numerous references to the John F. Kennedy assassination in 1963
- The Quiet American – 2002 film by Phillip Noyce, set in Saigon in French Indochina, where an undercover CIA agent is assassinated
- The Bourne Identity – 2002 film by Doug Liman about an amnesiac CIA assassin and the assassination of a deposed African dictator
- Sniper 2 – 2002 sequel by Craig R. Baxley about a former U.S. Marine sniper targeting a Serbian general guilty of war crimes against Bosnian Muslims
- Assassination Tango – 2002 film by Robert Duvall where a hitman, in Argentina to assassinate a general, becomes involved with a tango teacher
- Star Wars: Episode II – Attack of the Clones – 2002 science fiction film by George Lucas concerns the investigation by Jedi Master Obi-Wan Kenobi of a failed assassination directed at a Galactic Senator
- Death to Smoochy – 2002 comedy by Danny DeVito about a plot to kill the popular host of a children's television show
- Die Another Day – 2002 film by Lee Tamahori that opens with James Bond on an assassination run

==== 2003–2005 ====
- Killing Hitler – 2003 docudrama by Jeremy Lovering about Operation Foxley, the 1944 British plan to kill Adolf Hitler

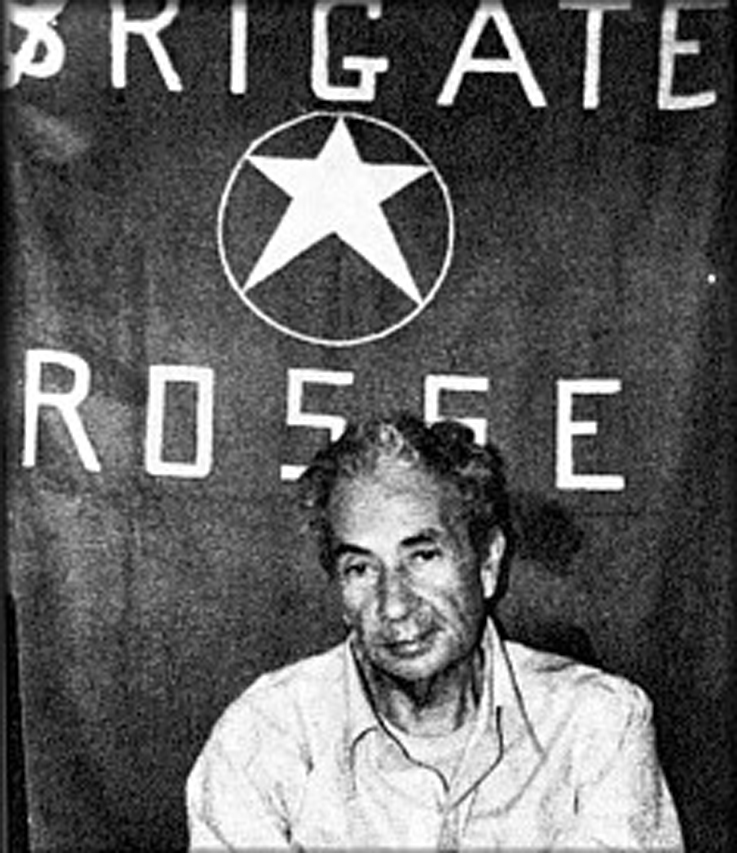
Aldo Moro before his murder, 1978

- Good Morning, Night – 2003 Italian film by Marco Bellocchio about the death of former Prime Minister Aldo Moro in 1978
- The Reagans – 2003 Showtime miniseries by Robert Allan Ackerman includes the 1981 failed assassination in which U.S. President Reagan and press secretary Brady were seriously wounded
- 06/05 – 2003 Dutch film by assassinated director Theo van Gogh about the assassination of politician Pim Fortuyn by an animal rights activist in 2002
- Veronica Guerin – 2003 film by Joel Schumacher about the 1996 murder of an Irish reporter, Veronica Guerin, by a Dublin drug gang
- Tears of the Sun – 2003 remake (of Dark of the Sun) by Antoine Fuqua, set during a fictional Nigerian Civil War, begins with the off-screen assassination of the President (and family) by rebels, along with other echoes of the 1994 Rwandan genocide
- Imperium: Augustus – 2003 British/RAI miniseries by Roger Young about Roman Emperor Augustus and an unhistorical plot by Iullus Antonius, the son of Mark Antony
- The Statement – 2003 film by Norman Jewison about a war criminal and former member of the Vichy Milice who is targeted by, apparently, Jewish assassins
- Blind Horizon – 2003 film by Michael Haussman about an amnesiac with recollections of his involvement in an assassination plot against the U.S. President
- The Hunted – 2003 film by William Friedkin about assassins hunting other assassins
- The Hebrew Hammer – 2003 comedy by Jonathan Kesselman where Santa Claus is assassinated by his own son and holiday harmony must be restored by a Jewish crime fighter in a pimpmobile
- Children of Dune – 2003 miniseries by Greg Yaitanes
- X2 – 2003 film by Bryan Singer where an attempted assassination of the U.S. President is a pretext for a general war of human against mutant
- Head of State – 2003 comedy by Chris Rock in which an alderman becomes the first black candidate for U.S. President and imagines his own assassination
- Alexander – 2004 film by Oliver Stone in which Alexander the Great ascends the throne of Macedon after the assassination of King Philip in 336 BC, then campaigns through Africa and Asia until his suspicious death in 323 BC.
- Gunpowder, Treason & Plot – 2004 BBC miniseries by Gillies MacKinnon about the 1605 Gunpowder Plot to blow up Parliament and King James VI and I
- Stauffenberg – 2004 German television film by Jo Baier about the Stauffenberg plot against Adolf Hitler
- Die Stunde der Offiziere – 2004 German television film by Hans-Erich Viet about various plans to kill Adolf Hitler, culminating in the Stauffenberg plot
- Helter Skelter – 2004 television film by John Gray, about the Charles Manson Family murders, the Family including Squeaky Fromme, would-be 1975 assassin of President Ford
- H_{2}O – 2004 CBC miniseries by Charles Binamé where the Canadian PM dies in an apparent canoeing accident, but suspicions point to the Americans
- The Manchurian Candidate – 2004 remake by Jonathan Demme in which a U.S. Gulf War veteran is brainwashed into being a corporate agent who, as Vice-President, will assume the Presidency once the newly elected president is assassinated by his former comrade, brainwashed into acting as a hitman
- Kill Bill: Volume 1 and Volume 2 – 2004 films by Quentin Tarantino about an assassin, seeking vengeance against her former allies after they kill her fiancé and unborn child
- Collateral – 2004 film by Michael Mann in which a hitman enlists a cabbie in his work
- Man on Fire – 2004 film by Tony Scott about a bodyguard and ex-CIA assassin in Mexico whose young charge is kidnapped – remake of the 1987 film, set in Italy
- The President's Last Bang – 2005 South Korean black comedy by Im Sang-soo about the assassination of President Park Chung-hee in 1979 by his own KCIA Director of intelligence and friend
- The Feast of the Goat – 2005 Anglo-Spanish film by Luis Llosa about the assassination in 1961 of Rafael Trujillo, Dominican caudillo and occasional president, based on the novel by Mario Vargas Llosa
- Sometimes in April – 2005 television film by Raoul Peck in which the assassinations of Rwandan President Habyarimana, Burundian President Ntaryamira and Rwandan PM Uwilingiyimana initiate the 1994 Genocide
- Joseph Smith: Prophet of the Restoration – 2005 film by T.C. Christensen and Gary Cook about the death of Joseph Smith, founder of the Latter Day Saint movement, and his brother Hyrum in 1844 by an Illinois mob
- Pope John Paul II – 2005 CBS miniseries by John Kent Harrison in which the Pope survives an assassination attempt by a Turkish assassin in 1981
- Munich – 2005 film by Steven Spielberg about the hunt for those purportedly involved in the 1972 Munich massacre
- The Assassination of Richard Nixon – 2005 film by Niels Mueller about the attempted assassination, by hijacked airliner, of President Nixon, based on the suppressed 1974 Samuel Byck case
- Maine Gandhi Ko Nahin Mara – 2005 Indian (Hindi) film by Jahnu Barua about a retired university lecturer, suffering from early symptoms of Alzheimer's, who suddenly claims to have not killed Mahatma Gandhi in 1948
- Paradise Now – Oscar-nominated 2005 Dutch-Israeli (Arabic) film by Hany Abu-Assad where two Palestinian suicide bombers in Nablus, despairing of living under unending foreign occupation, are assigned a wedding in Tel Aviv, in retaliation for Israeli assassinations
- Syriana – 2005 film by Stephen Gaghan about a CIA assassin who is assigned to kill the foreign minister of an Arab emirate
- The Interpreter – 2005 film by Sydney Pollack about a United Nations interpreter who overhears a plot to assassinate a visiting African President
- The State Counsellor – 2005 Russian film by Filipp Yankovsky in which a detective in 1891 tries to prevent the assassination of the Tsarist Governor of Moscow by revolutionaries
- Left Behind: World at War – 2005 film by Craig R. Baxley in which the U.S. President tries to assassinate Nicolae Carpathia, the Secretary-General of the UN and the Antichrist, but fails
- Star Wars: Episode III – Revenge of the Sith – 2005 science fiction film by George Lucas in which the Chancellor employs assassins, including Darth Vader, against his Jedi opposition
- Æon Flux – 2005 science fiction film by Karyn Kusama where a rebel assassin is assigned to kill the leader of her city-state
- The Matador – 2005 comedy by Richard Shepard about an aging bisexual hitman who wants to retire

==== 2006–2007 ====
- Bobby – 2006 film by Emilio Estevez about the assassination of U.S. presidential candidate Robert F. Kennedy in 1968 by an Arab nationalist
- The Killing of John Lennon – 2006 film by Andrew Piddington about the 1980 murder of former Beatle John Lennon by a delusional Christian fan
- October 1970 – 2006 CBC miniseries by Don McBrearty about the assassination of Quebec Labour Minister Pierre Laporte by FLQ terrorists during the 1970 October Crisis
- Lilís – 2006 Dominican film by Jimmy Sierra about Dominican dictator Ulises Heureaux and his assassination in 1899
- Karol: The Pope, The Man – 2006 miniseries by Giacomo Battiato, about the papacy of John Paul II, involves the assassinations of Salvadoran archbishop Óscar Romero, Polish priest Jerzy Popiełuszko, Italian magistrate Paolo Borsellino, and the "Romeo and Juliet of Sarajevo", as well as the 1981 wounding of the Pope by a Turkish assassin, sponsored by the Soviets and Turkish terrorists
- The Last King of Scotland – 2006 film by Kevin Macdonald in which Ugandan President Idi Amin eliminates those whom he dislikes, provoking his physician to plot his assassination
- The Way I Spent the End of the World – 2006 Romanian film by Cătălin Mitulescu about a seven-year-old boy who decides to assassinate dictator Nicolae Ceauşescu with friends from the school choir
- Death of a President – 2006 fictional documentary by Gabriel Range recalling the 2007 assassination of President George W. Bush in Chicago
- The Wind That Shakes the Barley – Palme d'Or-winning 2006 film by Ken Loach about political violence in 1920 during the Anglo-Irish War
- All the King's Men – 2006 remake by Steven Zaillian about the assassination of Southern governor Willie Stark, inspired by the 1935 death of Louisiana governor Huey Long
- Bordertown – 2006 film by Gregory Nava about the killing of a newspaper editor who publicizes the murders of maquiladora workers in Ciudad Juárez, Mexico
- American Dreamz – 2006 satire by Paul Weitz about a terrorist plot against a strongly Bush-like U.S. President when he appears as a guest judge on a strongly Pop Idol-like TV programme
- Land of the Blind – 2006 film by Robert Edwards in which the despotic king and queen of Everycountry [sic] are overthrown and killed by a rebel leader
- Rang De Basanti – 2006 Indian (Hindi) film by Rakeysh Omprakash Mehra in which a group of university students becomes radicalized while making a movie about the assassination of British police superintendent J.P. Saunders in 1928, so when they, and other anti-corruption protesters, are badly beaten by police colluding with Hindu extremists, one volunteers to kill the Defence Minister
- V for Vendetta – 2006 film by the Wachowskis wherein the main character, known only as V, inspired by the 1605 Gunpowder Plot, assassinates numerous governmental and quasi-governmental officials in his quest to topple a fascist regime; based on the graphic novel by Alan Moore
- End Game – 2006 film by Andy Cheng in which the assassination of the U.S. President leads to a series of other murders
- The Sentinel – 2006 film by Clark Johnson about a plot within the Secret Service to assassinate the U.S. President
- The Contract – 2006 film by Bruce Beresford in which a notorious assassin, presumably targeting the U.S. President, is himself targeted while under arrest by a citizen
- Casino Royale – 2006 film by Martin Campbell that shows how James Bond first became "licensed to kill", through two assassinations
- Shake Hands with the Devil – 2007 film by Roger Spottiswoode, in which the assassination of President Juvénal Habyarimana triggers the 1994 Rwandan genocide – the same incident killed Burundian President Cyprien Ntaryamira
- Il Capo dei Capi – 2007 Italian Canale 5 miniseries by Alexis Sweet and Enzo Monteleone about the murders of Italian lawmen Giovanni Falcone and Paolo Borsellino, and others, through the 1960s and 1970s, by Sicilian mafiosi
- Héroes, la gloria tiene su precio – 2007 Chilean Canal 13 miniseries by Cristián Galaz et al., about 19th-century Chilean history, includes the murder of statesman Diego Portales by Santiago Florín in 1837
- National Treasure 2: Book of Secrets – 2007 sequel by Jon Turteltaub which opens with the 1865 assassination of U.S. President Lincoln in Ford's Theatre during a performance of Our American Cousin
- Elizabeth: The Golden Age – 2007 film by Shekhar Kapur, where Queen Elizabeth I learns of an assassination plot against her by Mary, Queen of Scots and Anthony Babington, based on the 1586 Babington Plot

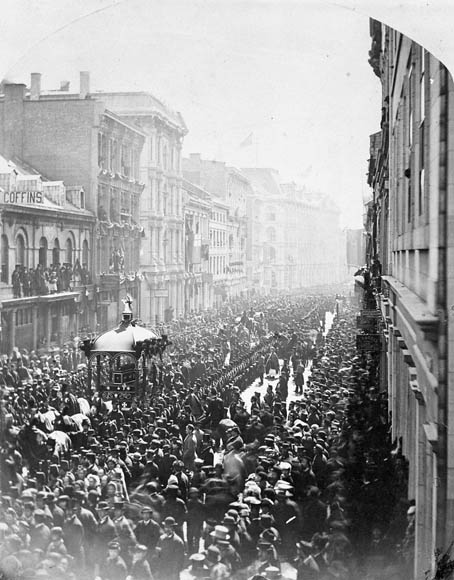
Procession for D'Arcy McGee, assassinated 1868

- Chapter 27 – 2007 film by J.P. Schaefer about the 1980 murder of former Beatle John Lennon by a delusional Christian fan
- September Dawn – 2007 film by Christopher Cain, about the 1857 Mountain Meadows massacre of settlers by Mormons, includes the 1844 death of Joseph Smith, founder of the Latter Day Saint movement
- A Mighty Heart – 2007 film by Michael Winterbottom about the murder of journalist Daniel Pearl by Islamist terrorists in 2002
- The Warlords – 2007 Chinese (Mandarin) film by Peter Chan about the assassination of a Qing general, based on the death of Ma Xinyi in 1870
- 13 Roses – 2007 Spanish film by Emilio Martínez Lázaro about the fate of 13 young women when rumours of an assassination plot against Generalissimo Franco circulate after the Fall of Madrid in 1939
- The Assassination of Jesse James by the Coward Robert Ford – 2007 film by Andrew Dominik about the murder of outlaw Jesse James by his friend Robert Ford in 1882, and then Ford's own assassination in 1892
- The Hunting Party – 2007 film by Richard Shepard in which journalists in Bosnia attempting to contact a Serb war criminal are mistaken for CIA assassins, inspired by actual events centred on Radovan Karadžić
- Goodbye Bafana – 2007 film by Bille August, about Nelson Mandela's prison guard, includes speculation about the car crash death of Mandela's son, Thembi, in 1969
- Lust, Caution – 2007 film by Ang Lee where, during the Sino-Japanese War, a group of Hong Kong students plot to kill a visiting official of the collaborationist Wang Jingwei government
- Mein Führer – Die wirklich wahrste Wahrheit über Adolf Hitler – 2007 German satire by Dani Levy in which Adolf Hitler avoids assassination by his Jewish drama teacher
- Shooter – 2007 film by Antoine Fuqua about a recluse set up to be the lone gunman in an apparent assassination attempt on the U.S. president
- Hitman – 2007 film by Xavier Gens based on the popular video game franchise of the same name, in the movie a genetically engineered assassin known only as "Agent 47" who targets the Russian President

==== 2008–2009 ====
- Il Divo – 2008 Italian film by Paolo Sorrentino about Italian PM Giulio Andreotti and the murders of journalist Mino Pecorelli, Carabinieri general Carlo Alberto Dalla Chiesa, bankers Michele Sindona and Roberto Calvi, and PM Aldo Moro

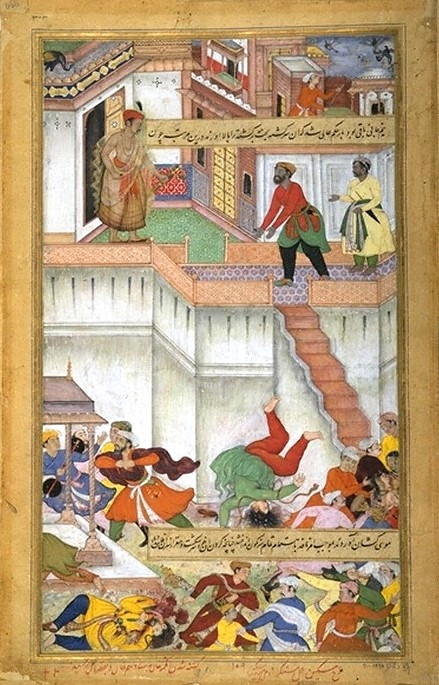
Adham Khan, executed 1562

- Jodhaa Akbar – 2008 Indian (Hindustani) film by Ashutosh Gowariker includes the assassination of the Prime Minister of the Mughal Empire, Shamsuddin Atka Khan, by Adham Khan in 1562, as well as two attempts against Emperor Akbar, orchestrated by his brother-in-law
- Valkyrie – 2008 film by Bryan Singer about the Stauffenberg plot against Adolf Hitler
- The Devil's Whore – 2008 Channel 4 miniseries by Marc Munden, set during the English Civil War, in which a disillusioned officer plots the assassination of Oliver Cromwell until his arrest in 1657
- Che – 2008 film by Steven Soderbergh in which Argentine revolutionary Ernesto "Che" Guevara meets his death in Bolivia in 1967
- House of Saddam – 2008 BBC/HBO miniseries by Alex Holmes and Jim O'Hanlon includes the 1982 failed assassination of then-U.S. ally Saddam Hussein in Dujail by Islamic terrorists, but grossly exaggerates the reaction of the Iraqi government
- Milk – 2008 film by Gus Van Sant about the murders of San Francisco mayor George Moscone and supervisor Harvey Milk by a disgruntled coworker in 1978
- Der Baader Meinhof Komplex – 2008 Oscar-nominated German film by Uli Edel about the Baader Meinhof Gang and their assassinations of prominent citizens – Siegfried Buback, Jürgen Ponto, Hanns Martin Schleyer – in 1977
- Flame & Citron – 2008 Danish film by Ole Christian Madsen about the two principal assassins of the anti-Nazi Danish Resistance
- Les Femmes de l'Ombre – 2008 French film by Jean-Paul Salomé in which a group of French female SOE agents are sent to Normandy in 1944 to assassinate an SS colonel, based on the story of Lisé de Baissac
- Eagle Eye – 2008 film by D.J. Caruso in which an indignant computer system, outraged by a U.S. war crime, uses ordinary citizens to wipe out the entire upper echelon of the U.S. government, and impose a President of its own choosing
- Vantage Point – 2008 film by Pete Travis about the seeming assassination of a U.S. President in Spain
- XIII – 2008 Canal+ miniseries by Duane Clark in which the first female U.S. President is assassinated, and an amnesiac is suspected
- Nothing But the Truth – 2008 film by Rod Lurie where the shooting of the U.S. President leads to war with Venezuela and the assassination of a CIA agent
- Bangkok Dangerous – 2008 film by the Pang Brothers in which a hitman, following a series of hits on crime lords, learns that he has been assigned the Thai Prime Minister as his final target
- Get Smart – 2008 comedy by Peter Segal includes a plot to kill the U.S. President during a concert with a nuclear blast
- War, Inc. – 2008 satire by Joshua Seftel where, in Central Asia, after the first fully privatized war, a corporate assassin is sent to kill a competing conglomerate's natural gas executive – a semi-sequel to Grosse Pointe Blank
- The Dark Knight – 2008 film by Christopher Nolan includes the Joker's assassination of the Gotham City police commissioner, amongst others
- La Linea – 2008 film by James Cotten about a hitman tracking a Tijuana drug lord
- Wanted – 2008 film by Timur Bekmambetov about an overstressed accountant who becomes involved with a hypermasculine girl assassin from an assassins' "fraternity"
- The White Ribbon – 2009 German language film by Michael Haneke ends with the 1914 assassination of Austrian Archduke Franz Ferdinand
- Trópico de Sangre – 2009 Dominican film by Juan Delancer, about the 1960 murders of the three Mirabal sisters for their opposition to Dominican dictator Rafael Trujillo

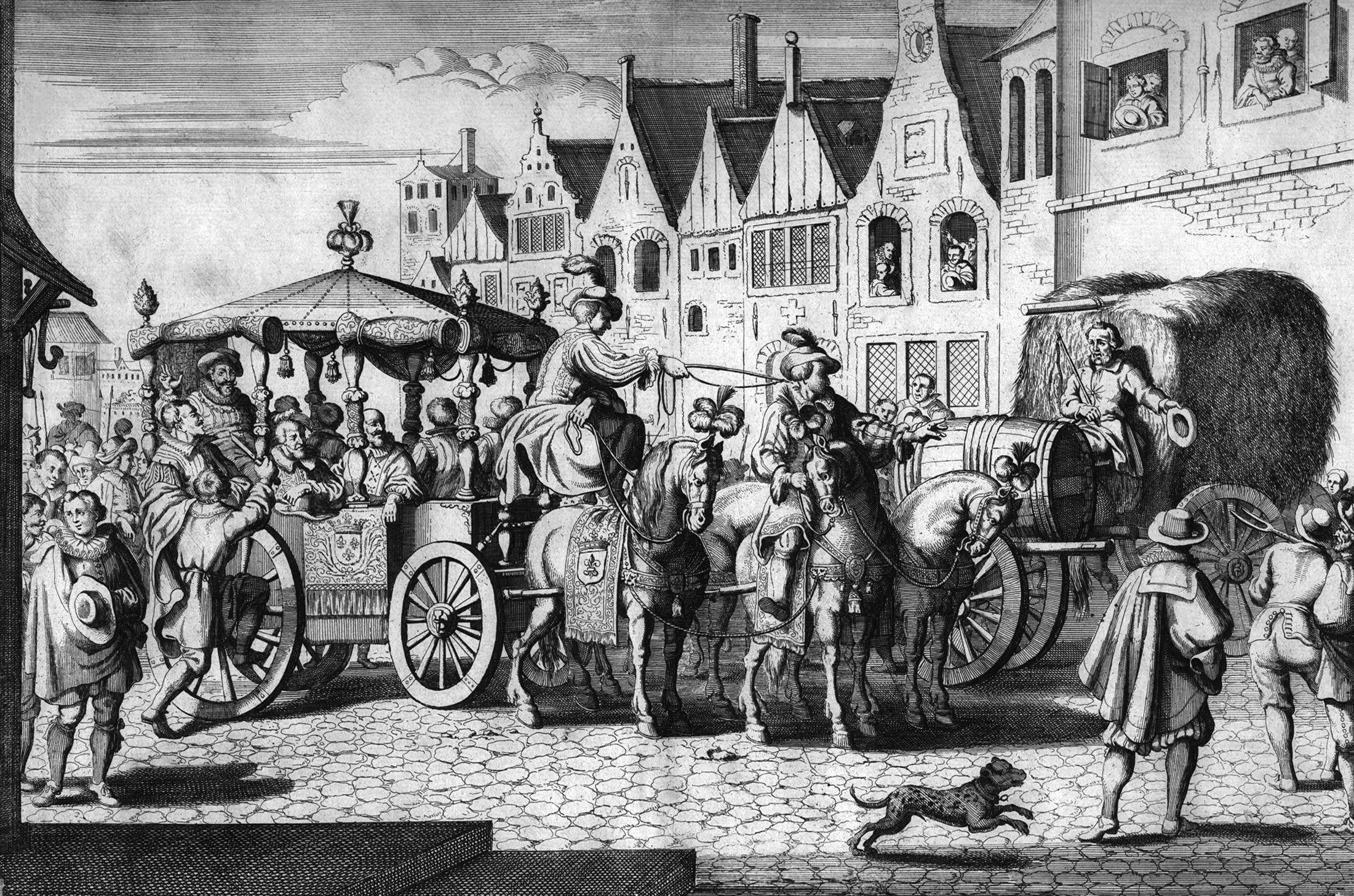
Assassination of Henry IV, 1610

- The Young Victoria – 2009 film by Jean-Marc Vallée in which Queen Victoria survives an assassination attempt by a deranged young man in 1840
- Bodyguards and Assassins – 2009 Hong Kong film by Teddy Chan where China's Empress Dowager dispatches assassins to murder revolutionary leader Sun Yat-sen in 1905
- Notorious – 2009 film by George Tillman, Jr. about the unsolved murders of rappers Tupac Shakur in 1996 and Notorious B.I.G. in 1997
- Me and Orson Welles – 2009 film by Richard Linklater about Orson Welles and his 1937 theatre production of Shakespeare's Julius Caesar
- Inglourious Basterds – 2009 film by Quentin Tarantino about two fictional plans to assassinate Adolf Hitler, one by a team of Jewish OSS agents, the other by a French Jew
- Pope Joan – 2009 film by Bernd Eichinger about Pope Joan, the legendary female English Pope
- Sherlock Holmes – 2009 film by Guy Ritchie about a plot to kill members of the Houses of Parliament with poison gas
- The International – 2009 film by Tom Tykwer about the murder of a candidate for Prime Minister of Italy
- Law Abiding Citizen – 2009 film by F. Gary Gray about the assassinations of Philadelphia city officials by an aggrieved family man
- Frame of Mind – 2009 film by Carl T. Evans where a detective discovers film showing a gunman on the grassy knoll at the time of U.S. President Kennedy's assassination in 1963
- Watchmen – 2009 science fiction film by Zack Snyder, about a conspiracy to assassinate retired superheroes, based on the graphic novel by Alan Moore, also includes a recreation of the 1963 Kennedy assassination
- Harry Potter and the Half-Blood Prince – 2009 fantasy film by David Yates in which a Hogwarts student is assigned to assassinate headmaster Albus Dumbledore
- Assassination of a High School President – 2009 film by Brett Simon in which a disgraced student council president takes aim at his successor

=== 2010s ===
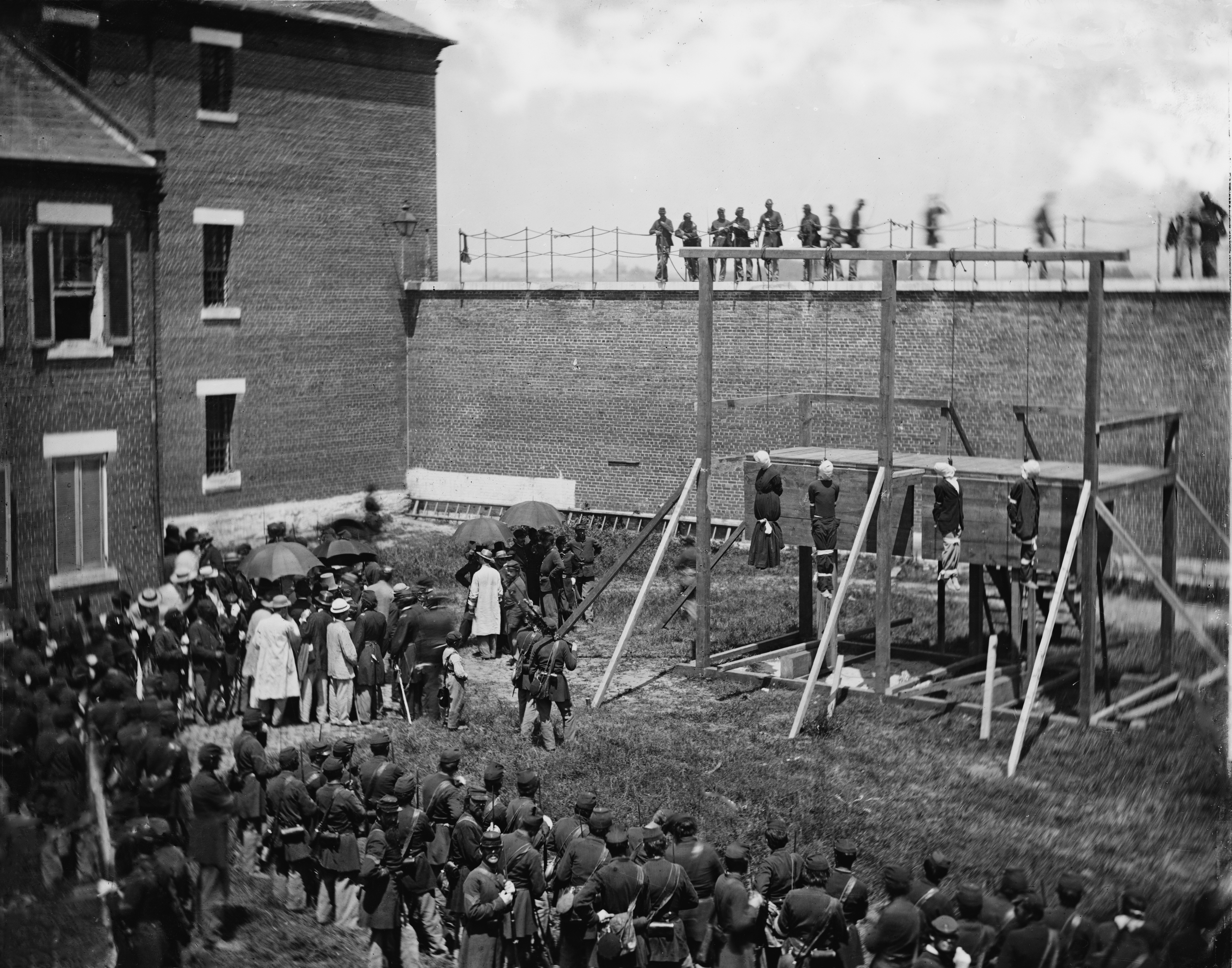
Mary Surratt, executed 1865

- The Conspirator – 2010 film by Robert Redford about Mary Surratt and the 1865 Abraham Lincoln assassination
- Formosa Betrayed – 2010 film by Adam Kane in which the murder of a Taiwanese-American professor takes an FBI agent to Taiwan, based on two murders which occurred in 1981 and 1984
- Robin Hood – 2010 film by Ridley Scott features an assassination plot against King Richard the Lionheart but he is killed first in battle (A.D. 1199)
- Prince of Persia: The Sands of Time – 2010 film by Mike Newell which begins with the poisoning of the Persian king
- The Ghost – 2010 film by Roman Polanski which includes the assassination of a former U.K. PM
- Salt – 2010 film by Phillip Noyce in which Soviet-era moles target the Russian and American presidents
- Red – 2010 film by Robert Schwentke where a retired CIA agent pursues a plan to kill a war criminal, the U.S. Vice President
- The Expendables – 2010 film by Sylvester Stallone about a multinational military force tasked with assassinating a South American dictator
- Green Zone – 2010 film by Paul Greengrass about a U.S. soldier who tries to prevent the assassination of an Iraqi general by U.S. government death squads
- Machete – 2010 film by Robert Rodriguez about a former Mexican federale whose assassination of a corrupt U.S. senator goes awry
- Edge of Darkness – 2010 film by Martin Campbell about the murder of a corporate whistleblower and the investigation by her father
- The American – 2010 film by Anton Corbijn
- The Kennedys – 2011 History Television/ReelzChannel miniseries by Jon Cassar where U.S. President Jack Kennedy is killed by a Dallas Book Depository employee who is then killed, while his brother Bobby is killed five years later
- J. Edgar – 2011 film by Clint Eastwood about FBI director J. Edgar Hoover includes the 1919 anarchist bomb attacks against U.S. Attorney General A. Mitchell Palmer and others
- The Devil's Double – 2011 film by Lee Tamahori involves several attempted assassinations of Saddam Hussein's eldest son Uday, or Uday's double, Latif Yahia
- Killer Elite – 2011 remake by Gary McKendry in which ex-Special Forces hitmen try to kill ex-SAS men, including author Ranulph Fiennes, over a grudge about a 1972 Omani battle
- Salmon Fishing in the Yemen – 2011 film by Lasse Hallström with an attempt on a Yemeni sheikh for bringing water to the desert against God's will
- The Double – 2011 film by Michael Brandt involving the murder of a U.S. Senator
- The Mechanic – 2011 remake by Simon West about a hitman, his protégé, a drug lord, and a TV evangelist
- Assassination Games – 2011 film by Ernie Barbarash where two hitmen team up against a drug lord
- Colombiana – 2011 film by Olivier Megaton about a Chicago hitwoman with a grudge against a CIA asset, a Colombian ganglord
- Hanna – 2011 film by Joe Wright about a bio-engineered girl who tries to kill the intelligence agent responsible
- God Bless America – 2011 comedy by Bobcat Goldthwait in which two angry citizens target rightwing extremists and narcissistic TV personalities
- Zero Dark Thirty – 2012 film by Kathryn Bigelow about the 2011 U.S. assassination of terrorist Osama bin Laden
- The Dictator – 2012 comedy by Larry Charles which features several attempts on the life of a North African dictator
- Snow White and the Huntsman – 2012 fantasy film by Rupert Sanders where an evil queen decides to murder her possible successor, Snow White
- Men in Black 3 – 2012 science fiction film by Barry Sonnenfeld where Agent J must prevent his partner's assassination back in 1969
- Lincoln – 2012 film by Steven Spielberg; the film ends with his assassination in 1865
- Olympus Has Fallen – 2013 action thriller film in which North Korean terrorists attack Washington, D.C. and take over the White House in which they assassinate the South Korean Prime Minister during a visit and also attempt to assassinate the President of the United States
- White House Down – 2013 action thriller movie by Roland Emmerich in which a paramilitary group take over the White House and attempt to assassinate the President of the United States
- Captain America: The Winter Soldier – 2014 superhero film in which S.H.I.E.L.D. director Nick Fury endures repeated assassination attempts while looking into a conspiracy inside his organization
- The Interview – 2014 movie where a TV show host assassinates the dictator of North Korea
- Heneral Luna – 2015 film by Jerrold Tarog; the film ends with his assassination in 1899
- Hitman: Agent 47 – 2015 film directed by Aleksander Bach, reboot of the 2007 film, about a genetically engineered assassin known only as "Agent 47"
- Kingsman: The Secret Service – 2015 spy movie where a madman plans to depopulate Earth by using his personal technology (MP3 players and cellphones) to trigger people's combative instincts, driving them to attack and kill one another
- The Purge: Election Year – 2016 dystopian science fiction action horror film by James DeMonaco in which Caleb Warrens, the Leader of the "New Founding Fathers of America", and the other NFFA members are killed by a group of rebels in a cathedral, during the film
- Death Note – 2017 film directed by Adam Wingard, about a student able to kill people by writing their name in a notebook
- Kaappaan – 2019 Indian Tamil-language action thriller film directed by K. V. Anand and written by Pattukkottai Prabakar.The narrative revolves around Kathiravan, a Special Protection Group (SPG) officer who struggles to protect the Prime Minister from a mysterious man who threatens to assassinate him

=== Assassinated filmmakers ===
One direct and one indirect victim of terrorism.

- Theo van Gogh (1957–2004) – provocative Dutch producer/director
  - Submission (2004)
  - Interview (2007), an English-language remake by Steve Buscemi of van Gogh's 2003 film
- Moustapha Akkad (1930–2005) – provocative Syrian producer/director
  - The Message (1976) – a respectful, subjective-camera telling of the life of the Prophet of Islam – informative for أهل الكتاب (People of the Book)
  - Lion of the Desert (1981) – about Omar Mukhtar, and Libyan resistance to Italy replacing the Ottoman Empire as colonial power – a subject not otherwise addressed in an English-language film

== Television ==
- Playhouse 90 (1956–1960) – The 1958 episode "The Plot To Kill Stalin" involved a plot against Uncle Joe.
- The Time Tunnel (1966–1967) – The episode "The Death Trap" involves both the 1865 assassination of U.S. President Lincoln and the 1861 conspiracy against him, known as the "Baltimore Plot".
- Star Trek (1966–1969) – In the episode "Journey to Babel", the Tellarite ambassador is assassinated and an attempt is made on the life of Captain James T. Kirk. In the episode "The Savage Curtain", U.S. President Abraham Lincoln is murdered, but in battle on an alien world.
- Saturday Night Live (1975–2019) – Nightline broadcaster Ted Koppel reports as famous but incomprehensible actor Buckwheat is assassinated on live television, and then Buckwheat's assassin (Murphy again) is assassinated in turn.
- Red Dwarf (1988–1999) – The episode "Tikka to Ride" features an elaborate plot which takes place in an alternate timeline where JFK survives due to accidental interference by the Red Dwarf crew. After witnessing the negative result of his survival the crew enlist Kennedy to go back in time to carry out the assassination. The plan works: Kennedy shoots his past self and the timeline is restored. Kennedy grimly thanks the gang for the chance to restore himself to his proper place in history, and fades away as a result of the resetting timeline.
- Quantum Leap (1989–1993) – The episode "Lee Harvey Oswald" concerns the assassination of U.S. President John F. Kennedy.
- Babylon 5 (1993–1998) – features several assassinations (meaning the targeted killing of a significant political figure, rather than the many other deaths or murders that occur in the show). One of the earliest assassinations is of Earth's President Santiago, in a spectacular scene showing the explosion of the Presidential Spaceship, Earth Force One. The same episode shows his Vice-President Clark being sworn in. The scene is shot as a replica of the swearing in of LBJ, following the JFK assassination, complete with Santiago's widow posed in the background. Clark's assumption of power begins Earth's slow decline into fascism, and it was discovered his faction arranged the assassination of President Santiago.
- La Femme Nikita (1997–2001) – a television spy drama, based on the French film Nikita, in which assassins work in a secret government counter-terrorist organization, "Section One". Section One's operatives (assassins) work not for monetary gain nor from ideological devotion, but out of a fear of being cancelled (executed) for sub-standard performance. La Femme Nikita had a run of five seasons and a total of 96 episodes; during its first two seasons, it was the highest-rated drama on American basic cable. Joel Surnow and Robert Cochran, who created and produced La Femme Nikita, later went on to create 24.
- Freaks and Geeks (1999–2000) – Episode 15, "Noshing and Moshing", is set at the time of the assassination attempt on U.S. President Reagan. One character believes that it was the result of a conspiracy organized by Vice-President Bush.
- The West Wing (1999–2006) – In the first-season finale, in the episode "What Kind of Day Has It Been" there is an assassination attempt on U.S. President Bartlet's personal aide, Charlie Young. It is, however, thwarted by the Secret Service. In the following episodes the assassins are discovered to have been members of an organization called Virginia White Pride, a group of racists and white supremacists. In the third season, President Bartlet orders the assassination of Qumari Defence Minister Abdul Ibn Shareef, after it comes to light that the latter has ordered a group of terrorists to blow up the Golden Gate Bridge and is plotting other terrorist acts.
- Alias (2001–2006) – Numerous assassinations, real and simulated, take place over the course of Sydney Bristow's odyssey through the underworld of covert intelligence and international organized crime.
- 24 (2001–2010) – Assassination plots have featured prominently throughout: Season 1 revolves around Counter-Terrorist Unit agent Jack Bauer's attempts to stop the assassination of Democratic presidential candidate David Palmer. Season 2 ends with the attempted assassination of now-President Palmer. Season 3 involves the assassination by Jack Bauer of his superior Ryan Chappelle at the behest of terrorist Stephen Saunders. Season 4 features an attempt to assassinate U.S. President Keeler by shooting down Air Force One (and subsequently the assassination of the president's son). Season 5's plot begins with a hired killer assassinating former U.S. President David Palmer at the beginning of the first episode, along with the assassination of CTU employee Michelle Dessler. Later in the 13th episode, Christopher Henderson attempts to assassinate Michelle's husband Tony Almeida. Season 6 involves the attempted assassinations of U.S. President Wayne Palmer and former U.S. President Charles Logan. In season 7, the husband of president Allison Taylor is assassinated. In season 8, the president of a fictitious Middle-East country is assassinated; later, after his partner Renee Walker is assassinated, Jack Bauer goes on a killing spree, killing several Russian officials who were members of the conspiracy, and finally targets the Russian president, but his assassination attempt is thwarted by his friend Chloe O'Brien, now acting director of CTU. In 24: Live Another Day, U.S. president James Heller is targeted for assassination.
- Monk (2002–2009) – The pilot episode centres on the failed assassination of a mayoral candidate, while the first episode of Season 3 involves the murder of the Latvian ambassador in New York City. In Season 3 Episode 12, Monk himself becomes the target of Chinatown hitmen.
- NCIS (2003–present) – In Season 1, Episode 1 the death of a naval officer aboard Air Force One may represent an assassination attempt on ostensible U.S. President George W. Bush.
- Veronica Mars (2004–2007) – Roman Emperor Caligula is namechecked by Veronica in Season 2, Episode 39, and two evil principal characters are assassinated in the season finale.
- Stargate Atlantis (2004–2009) – Several assassination attempts are featured through the series, the most extreme of them being the coup when Ladon Radim assassinates Chief Cowen and his Elite Guard with a hidden nuclear device, taking over as the new Genii leader. On another occasion, the protagonists narrowly protect the 13-year-old Harmony from an attempt on her life ordered by one of her sisters (in order to usurp her position as would-be queen). In yet another incident, Teyla (disguised as a Wraith Queen) and Todd infiltrate a Hive Ship under the guise of negotiations. However, Todd stabs the Queen to death and blames Teyla for it, resulting in her becoming the new Queen.
- Lost (2004–2010) – In Season 4, former Iraqi Army torturer Sayid Jarrah works as an assassin for the mysterious Ben Linus. In Season 6, Sayid again becomes an assassin, this time for the Smoke Monster.
- House (2004–2012) – In Season 6 episode "The Tyrant", a hospitalized African dictator avoids one assassination attempt before being murdered by a doctor.
- Rome (2005–2006) – HBO/BBC/RAI series by Michael Apted et al. on wars, intrigue, and personal and political violence in ancient Rome. Season 1 includes the assassinations of several historical figures, Pompey, Pothinus, and Julius Caesar. Season 2 includes the assassination of Cicero but, unhistorically, omits Caesarion.
- Heroes (2006–2010) – In the finale of the second volume of Heroes, "Generations", former New York Congressman Nathan Petrelli gives a nationally televised speech to the media in Odessa, Texas, regarding the successful stopping of an outbreak of a deadly virus. About to reveal that he has the ability to fly, he is shot in the chest twice, mid-sentence, by an unknown assassin who quickly leaves the scene. Nathan falls into the arms of his brother, Peter, and uses his last breath to whisper his name.
- Robin Hood (2006–2009) – The story involves plots against the life of King Richard I of England.
- Reaper (2007) – President William McKinley's assassin Leon Czolgosz appears in "Leon", Episode 6 of the first season.
- Doctor Who (2005–present) – Series 3 episode 12 "The Sound of Drums" U.S. President Arthur Coleman Winters was killed by UK Prime Minister Harold Saxon (The Master).
- The Tudors (2007–2010) – There is an assassination attempt against Anne Boleyn on the way to her coronation, in Episode 3 of Season 2.
- Burn Notice (2007–2013) – This series features several minor assassinations in order to cover up the conspiracy that burned spy Michael Weston investigates as he is attempting to clear his name after he becomes affiliated with it. His narration, in which he acts if he is teaching a class of new spies, also discusses the concept several times.
- Murdoch Mysteries (2007–present) – The Season 3 episode "The Murdoch Identity" involves a plot against Queen Victoria and her War Secretary in Bristol, England.
- IRIS (2009) – The South Korean TV series details a black ops agency named the National Security Service or NSS, an agency created by Park Chung-Hee that protected South Korea by operations including assassination. One of its agents, Kim Hyun-Jun, goes rogue after completing his assassination assignment in Hungary after being betrayed by NSS Director Baek San and threatened with assassination himself by his friend and fellow NSS operative Jin Sa-Woo. An arms-dealing terrorist group called IRIS also uses assassination to kill off anyone trying to rout out the group and prevent the Koreas from reuniting under peace talks.
- Warehouse 13 (2009–2014) – The pilot episode features an attempted assassination of the U.S. president at a Washington museum.
- The Event (2010–2011) – The story involves a U.S. presidential assassination attempt.
- Nikita (2010–2013) – An updating of the 1990s series, once again focusing on the exploits of a female assassin and her section.
- Designated Survivor (2016–2019) – A bombing during the State of the Union address successfully assassinates almost the entirety of the United States government, with the protagonist assuming the role of president having been the former administration's designated survivor for the address.
- Hell on Wheels (2011–2016) – There is an assassination attempt against Brigham Young by his son Phineas in Episode 7 of Season 5.
- Killing Eve (2018) – Eve Polastri, a desk-bound MI5 officer, begins to track down talented psychopathic assassin Villanelle, while both women become obsessed with each other.
- Jack Ryan (2018–2023) – In Season 2 episode "Cargo", U.S. Senator Jimmy Moreno is assassinated by a sniper while on a diplomatic mission in Venezuela.

== Animation ==
- Golgo 13: The Professional – Directed by Osamu Dezaki, the anime is about a professional assassin. Only two anime installments were made
- Golgo 13 – The TV series details more on Duke Togo's assassination missions
- Noir – Anime television series that follows two female assassins' search to understand their past
- Darker than Black – Anime television series about ordinary people inexplicably changed into Contractors with extraordinary abilities who typically become cold-blooded killers
- Assassination Classroom – Anime television series adapted from a manga by Yūsei Matsui, about junior high students in their school's worst class, tasked with finding a way to assassinate an extremely powerful creature claiming it destroyed 70% of the moon, and will destroy the Earth one year later

== Board games ==
- The Plot to Assassinate Hitler (1976) – Published by SPI. One player represents the forces in Nazi Germany opposed to Hitler, both military and civilian, while the other player plays the Gestapo and SS. Prominent figures in the 20 July plot appear in the game as playing pieces, e.g. Canaris, Olbricht, Witzleben, Goerdeler

== Video games ==
- The Portopia Serial Murder Case (1983) – Adventure game focusing on a murder case in Kobe, Japan
- Golgo 13: Top Secret Episode (1988) and Golgo 13: The Mafat Conspiracy (1990) – two NES games based on the anime/manga
- Grand Theft Auto series (1997–2013) – features numerous missions which involve assassination
- Tenchu (1998–2008) – Same as above, the originator of the next-generation ninja subterfuge gaming genre. Released earlier, more story-driven and somewhat less political, assassination is a trademark feature of the series
- Hitman series (2000–present) – Popular tactical stealth game series which involves the assassination of various targets. There have been over eight games in the series so far, alongside a spiritual succsessor; 007 First Light.
- Ragnarok Online (2001) – An MMORPG where the player can choose to become an assassin as a second job class
- Splinter Cell (2002) – Stealth action game which ends with an assassination of a powerful political leader
- The Elder Scrolls III: Morrowind (2002) – role-playing video game with numerous assassinations and even a guild dedicated to assassinations called the Morag Tong
- XIII (2003) – about an amnesiac and the assassination of a U.S. President
- Grand Chase (2003) – Lass, the Thief and the fourth character, is an assassin as a second job using a curved sword called Scimitar
- JFK Reloaded (2004) – The game's sole objective is to recreate the John F. Kennedy assassination
- Vampire: The Masquerade – Bloodlines (2004) – Several assignments (some mandatory, some optional) involving assassination are included in this game, and the endgame involves the player deciding whether to assassinate one or both of the game's vampire clan leader antagonists
- Shinobido (2005) – Heavily stealth-based video game centred around feudal-era Japan and its inhabitants. The protagonist is a ninja, who is given contact killing missions among others, and becomes a politically heavily involved reconnaissance agent, thief and mostly, assassin
- Total War (2006) – a strategy game series where the player can send assassins against opponents
- The Elder Scrolls IV: Oblivion (2006) – role-playing video game in which one may join an assassins' guild, the Dark Brotherhood. Also, the main storyline opens with an emperor being assassinated; the entire game hinges on this event
- The Godfather: The Game (2006) – the game features several missions with the goal to assassinating high-ranking members of the Five Families, including the Dons
- Assassin's Creed (2007) – Game in which one plays a member of the Hashshashin sect during the Third Crusade
- Team Fortress 2 (2007) – Features one class, the spy, whose purpose is to assassinate other players. He features a knife among his weaponry that will kill instantly if it is a stab to the back of a character
- No More Heroes (2007) – The player is an assassin called Travis Touchdown who is the 11th ranked assassin of an organization called the UAA. The game leads the player to fight against the top 10 assassins of the UAA
- Call of Duty 4: Modern Warfare (2007) – In two missions, the player plays as a sniper on a failed assassination attempt
- Star Wars: Force Unleashed (2008) – The four first levels are a mission where the player attempts to assassinate Jedi masters
- Fable II (2008) – The player can be an assassin
- Call of Duty: World at War (2008) – In the first level of the Russian campaign, the player participates in the assassination of a Nazi general responsible for Stalingrad atrocities
- Fallout 3 (2008) – The player is tasked by an organization known as the Brotherhood of Steel to assassinate John Henry Eden, the self-proclaimed President of the United States
- MadWorld (2009) – The gameplay revolves around the player murdering other contestants in a game called "Deathwatch"
- Assassin's Creed II (2009) – The player assumes the role of a young nobleman-turned-assassin named Ezio Auditore da Firenze. The plot takes place in Renaissance Italy
- Assassin's Creed Brotherhood (2010) – Assassin Ezio Auditore da Firenze returns
- Call of Duty: Black Ops (2010) – Operatives Mason and Woods are sent to Cuba to assassinate Fidel Castro, but later find out that he had a lookalike. Another instance is when the player finds out that Mason was a conspirator in the John F. Kennedy assassination at the end of the game
- Just Cause (video game series) (2006–2018) – United States agent Rico travels to the fictional island-nations of San Esperito, Panau, Medici and Solis to assassinate the regime's corrupt dictators
- Fallout: New Vegas (2010) – The player can assassinate four major political leaders
- Assassin's Creed: Revelations (2011) – Assassin Ezio Auditore da Firenze returns for the final time
- Batman: Arkham City (2011) – The secondary mission "Shot in the Dark" involves contract killings. The League of Assassins are also part of the main plot
- Assassin's Creed III (2012) – A new Assassin arises to the creed
- Dishonored (2012) – Corvo Attano sets out to assassinate a conspiracy line to restore the rightful Emperess, Emily Kaldwin, on the throne. There are non-lethal alternatives to assassination targets
- Payday 2 (2013) – the Payday gang assassinates Ernesto Sosa, a fictional drug lord, who had been attacking weapon shipments of 'The Butcher,' an arms smuggler.

== See also ==
- History of assassination
- John F. Kennedy assassination in popular culture
- Politics in fiction
- Political fiction

== Sources ==
- Cousins, Mark. The Story of Film, BCA, Pavilion Books, London, 2004.
- Hartley, William H., Ed.D. Selected Films for American History and Problems, Teachers College, Columbia University, New York, 1940.
- Lewis, Bernard. The Assassins: A Radical Sect in Islam, Weidenfeld & Nicolson, London, 1967; Phoenix, Orion Books, London, 2003.
- London, Jack. The Assassination Bureau, Ltd., McGraw-Hill, New York, 1963; Penguin Books, Harmondsworth, 1978.
