= The Weapon of Night =

1967 novel by Valerie Moolman

First edition

The Weapon of Night is the 19th novel in the long-running Nick Carter-Killmaster series of spy novels. Carter is a US secret agent, code-named N-3, with the rank of Killmaster. He works for AXE – a secret arm of the US intelligence services.

== Publishing history ==
The book was first published in 1967 (Number A215F) by Award Books part of the Beacon-Signal division of Universal Publishing and Distributing Corporation (New York, USA), part of the Conde Nast Publications Inc. The novel was written by Valerie Moolman. Copyright was registered on 30 January 1967.

== Plot summary ==
The story is set in November 1966. A series of unexplained power outages and air and water pollution incidents affect many parts of the United States. Witnesses also report seeing unidentified lights in the sky.

AXE agent Nick Carter is contacted by Hakim Sadek – his collaborator on a previous mission (described in Safari for Spies) - reports that a German surgeon has performed cosmetic surgery on 9 individuals for no purpose other than to alter their normal appearance. Carter learns that Valentina Sichikova – his collaborator on a previous mission (described in The 13th Spy) is visiting the United States to inspect the West Valley Reprocessing Plant, which was close to the origin of the Northeast blackout of 1965 and to follow up the disappearance from Moscow of nine Chinese scientists.

Carter, Valentina and Julia Baron (Carter's collaborator on several earlier missions Run, Spy, Run, The China Doll, Fraulein Spy, Danger Key) visit the West Valley Reprocessing Plant and are given a guided tour by the plant's senior management. During the tour, Valentina recognizes one of the plant's staff. Before she can inform Carter everyone is knocked out by an invisible gas. When they awake Valentina is missing – apparently kidnapped and flown from the roof of the building in one of the plant's helicopters. Carter is suspicious and retraces the groups' movements before the gassing. He suspects that one of the plant's senior management, identified by Valentina, is an accomplice of the kidnapper and still in the building.

Carter visits the power generating room and breaks in. Searching the room carefully, Carter discovers a secret entrance leading to a small underground chamber. Carter finds Valentina. A large quantity of uranium and plutonium are missing.

Carter, Valentina and Julia return to Washington, D.C. Evidence points to Judas as the master mind. Judas is the cover name of Martin Bormann, now a terrorist and master spy with whom Carter has fought several times previously (see Run, Spy, Run; The China Doll; Fraulein Spy, Web of Spies, Danger Key).

Hakim discovers copies of the pre- and post-cosmetic surgery photos of the 9 suspects. Carter and Julia go to Montreal to trace suspects matching the description of these men. Carter breaks into the headquarters of a secretive group and discovers one of the nine communicating with operatives around the country via Morse code transmitter. Carter incapacitates the man and discovers the location of two of the operatives in Little Rock, Arkansas and Norfolk, Virginia. The saboteurs are using sophisticated projectors to simulate UFOs and various concentrated chemicals to trigger smog, tainted water and other forms of pollution to cause mass hysteria and civil unrest.

Carter and Julia return to New York. Carter uses a helicopter – equipped with Geiger counters – to search for the missing radioactive material. He finds it at an abandoned boating house on the shore of Lake Erie near Buffalo, New York. Carter kills the last four Chinese spies as they wait for final instructions from Judas. Judas suspects a trap and escapes by boat across Lake Erie into Canada.

Tracing a power surge to the Niagara Falls area, Carter flies by helicopter to investigate. Carter intercepts Judas at the Falls and chases him through the spray. Carter shoots Judas and sees him fall into the water near the Cave of the Winds. Judas is swept away but his body is not found.

Under interrogation, one of the 9 spies reveals that Judas and a Chinese General planned the operation to demoralize the population with pollution scares, radiation sickness and power outages; to be followed by a massive power cut and an invasion of the US accompanied by an unspecified secret weapon.

The plot has been foiled and everyone suspects Judas has been killed; Carter remains uncertain.

== Main characters ==
- Nick Carter - agent N-3, AXE
- Mr Hawk - Carter's boss; head of AXE
- Judas – Carter's arch-enemy
- Hakim Sadek – Egyptian policeman, H19
- Valentina Sichikova – USSR agent
- Julia Baron – agent with CIA Office of Current Intelligence (OCI)
