= Danger Key =

1966 novel by Lew Louderback

Danger Key is the 16th novel in the long-running Nick Carter-Killmaster series of spy novels. Carter is a US secret agent, code-named N-3, with the rank of Killmaster. He works for AXE – a secret arm of the US intelligence services.

== Publishing history ==
The book was first published in 1966 (Number A183F) by Award Books part of the Beacon-Signal division of Universal Publishing and Distributing Corporation (New York, USA), part of the Conde Nast Publications Inc. The novel was written by Lew Louderback. Copyright was registered on 1 February 1966.

== Plot summary ==
The novel is set in March 1966. A CIA agent who monitors Cuban refugees in Florida has been killed in a hit and run accident. The agent had been following up the disappearance of an elderly Cuban refugee who had recently resettled in Florida and the murder of his family. The CIA investigations revealed that the elderly refugee is really Mr. Judas – an international terrorist and master spy. Carter is assigned to impersonate Ralph Benson – a bumbling CIA agent whose poor judgment led to the death of the CIA agent – in an attempt to flush out the assassins.

Carter heads to the Florida Keys and visits a bar frequented by Benson and meets a woman who introduces herself as Ingra Brand – who matches eyewitness accounts of the person responsible for the hit and run death. Carter and Ingra Brand are followed by the local sheriff and his deputy. Carter is beaten and arrested. He is drugged and reveals his Benson cover but manages to escape.

Benson's apartment is subsequently ransacked and the real Benson shot dead. Carter discovers that while he was drugged the sheriff and his deputy injected him with X-L Fluid – a substance that enhances the detection of alpha particles from radioactive sources – allowing suspects to be tracked without their knowledge. Carter is followed and attacked in Benson's apartment by the deputy who commits suicide rather than be interrogated.

Recovering in hospital from the effects of the X-L Fluid, Carter teams up with Julia Baron (who assisted him in Run, Spy, Run; The China Doll; and Fraulein Spy). Hawk orders Carter and Baron to investigate a high-security NASA facility at Cape Sable, Florida – where Ingra Brand has recently worked on a secret missile system codenamed Project PHO.

While Julia Baron investigates Ingra Brand's background at Cape Sable, Carter visits Ingra's father, Gunther Brand, in Senior City – an elderly persons' residential community on No Name Key, Florida. To gain access, Carter impersonates one of Brand's former colleagues but is rebuffed by Brand's personal physician – Dr Karl Orff – who insists Brand is virtually senile after suffering a series of strokes. Carter suspects that Brand is in fact quite well and being held against his will. As he departs, Carter is followed by a number of suspicious characters and only escapes after he kills five of them in a chase across the tiny island.

Disguised as millionaire sports fisherman, Neill Crawford, Carter picks up Ingra Brand in a bar, administers an AXE truth drug, and interrogates her about the hit-and-run death of the CIA agent. She reveals that she had arranged to meet the CIA agent to seek his help concerning her father's health but was not present at the time of the agent's death – contradicting eyewitness statements. Carter believes Ingra was drugged by Dr Orff before she could meet the CIA agent and that a look-alike imposter killed the CIA agent in the hit-and-run. Ingra reveals that Orff had encouraged her to come to the bar tonight to see if she could flush out the agent responsible for the deaths at Senior City. Carter realizes he and Ingra have been set up and they narrowly escape being killed by a RDX shaped charge explosive concealed in Ingra's oversized handbag.

Carter immediately tries to contact Gunther Brand and returns to Senior City on No Name Key. Gunther Brand is not at home. Instead Carter is attacked by an imposter posing as Brand and another henchman. Carter kills them both and searches the house. He finds documents linking Gunther Brand to Nazi scientists.

Carter receives a message from AXE headquarters – Ingra Brand has just returned to the Cape Sable facility – meaning that the person accompanying Carter is also an imposter.

Carter discovers that the imposter and the person working at Cape Sable are the twin daughters of Prof Lautenbach – a Nazi scientist recruited by Judas / CLAW and killed by Carter in a previous mission two years earlier (described in Fraulein Spy). Separated aged 3 at the end of World War II and raised separately, Ilse Lautenbach works for CLAW while Ingra Lautenbach was adopted by Prof Brand and works for NASA.

Carter sets out to investigate the supposed Aquacity underwater construction project being built near Peligro (Spanish for 'danger') Key by Texan millionaire AK Atchinson. He discovers millions of dollars' worth of underwater submersibles and equipment but no sign of any construction project. Investigating further, Carter discovers an almost deserted mansion where AK Atchinson lives as a reclusive drugged zombie whose business empire has been taken over by Ilse Lautenbach and Judas to support their clandestine underwater construction project.

Judas is actually overseeing construction of a massive 26-mile-long underwater tunnel from Peligro Key to Cape Sable where he intends to steal the computerized missile guidance system and destroy the base to prevent discovery of the theft. At Cape Sable, Julia Baron attempts to stop Ilse Lautenbach and CLAW henchmen from removing the missile guidance system. She is captured and brought back to Judas' underground command center beneath Atchinson's mansion on Peligro Key. Carter is trapped along with 100 American underwater construction workers tricked into working on the immense underwater tunnel. However, they succeed in breaking out and intercept the missile guidance system before it is loaded onto a waiting submarine.

Carter is forced to return to Peligro Key when he discovers that Judas has captured Julia and she is about to be operated on alive by Dr Orff – a former Nazi doctor. Prof Brand foils Judas' attempt to leave Peligro Key with the missile component as Carter kills Ilse Lautenbach with Pierre the poison gas bomb. Carter kills Orff by slitting his throat. The underground command center explodes when Brand trips the self-destruct button – apparently killing Judas in the process.

Carter and Julie escape and recuperate in Miami.

== Main characters ==
- Nick Carter (agent N-3, AXE; posing as Ralph Benson – CIA agent; Charles Mackley – tabloid magazine reporter; Dr Lawrence Piquet – marine scientist; Neill Crawford – millionaire sports fisherman)
- Mr Hawk (Carter's boss, head of AXE)
- Julia (aka Julie) Baron – agent for OCI, Carter's ally
- Judas - (international terrorist and Carter's arch enemy)
- Ingra Brand (aka Ingra Lautenbach) – scientist working at NASA Cape Sable secret missile project
- Ilse Lautenbach (twin sister of Ingra Brand; CLAW agent)
- Gunther Brand (former Nazi scientist; adoptive father of Ingra Lautenbach)
- Dr Karl Orff (former Nazi doctor; Gunther Brand's personal physician; CLAW agent)
- AK Atchinson (elderly Texan oil millionaire and property developer)
