= Rhodesia (disambiguation) =

Rhodesia was an unrecognised state in southern Africa from 1965 to 1979, equivalent in territory to modern Zimbabwe and its predecessors, the colonies of Rhodesia and Southern Rhodesia.

Rhodesia may also refer to:

== Southern African regions and colonies ==
- Rhodesia (region), a historical region in southern Africa between 1891 and 1964
  - Southern Rhodesia, a self-governing colony that existed from 1923 to 1964 and again from 1979 to 1980
    - Rhodesia (1964–1965), the same colony after it changed its name in 1964, until it declared independence in 1965
    - Zimbabwe Rhodesia (1979–1980), an unrecognized transitional state
  - Northern Rhodesia, now Zambia

== Other uses ==
- Rhodesia, Nottinghamshire, a village in England
- Rhodesia (moth), a genus of Geometrinae moths
- Rhodesia (novel), a novel in the Nick Carter-Killmaster series
- 1197 Rhodesia, an asteroid
- Rhodesia, a fungus in Ascomycota phylum

== See also ==
- Zimbabwe (disambiguation)
