= Saigon (disambiguation) =

Saigon (Vietnamese: Sài Gòn) is the former name of Ho Chi Minh City, the most populous city in Vietnam. The name Sài Gòn is still currently used informally in Vietnam.

- Saigon, Ho Chi Minh City; administrative unit, the historic center of the city

Saigon may also refer to:

- Saigon River, a river in Vietnam
- Saigon (mango), a seedling race of mango cultivars
- Saigon (rapper) (born 1977), American hip hop artist
- Saigon (Grey novel), a 1982 novel by Anthony Grey
- Saigon (Killmaster novel), a 1964 Nick Carter novel
- Saigon (1948 film), a 1948 film starring Alan Ladd and Veronica Lake
- Off Limits (1988 film) or Saigon
- Bia Saigon, a beer brand of Vietnamese Sabeco Brewery
- "Saigon", a song by Luke Hemmings from When Facing the Things We Turn Away From

== See also ==
- Sai Kung District, a place in Hong Kong, with the same name in Chinese
- Miss Saigon, a 1989 musical
- Saigon cinnamon (Cinnamomum loureiroi), also known as Vietnamese cinnamon
