= Nick Carter (1964–1990 novel series) =

Series of spy adventures

- Country: United States
- Language: English
- Publisher: Award Books; Ace Books; Jove Books

Nick Carter is a series of spy adventure novels published from 1964 until 1990, first by Award Books, then by Ace Books, and finally by Jove Books. At least 261 novels were published. The character is an update of the classic pulp fiction private eye Nick Carter, first published in 1886. Carter is described as a "Killmaster" in this series, and that term is used to distinguish this series from other Nick Carter runs.

No actual author is credited for the books, with the Nick Carter name being used as a house pseudonym. Volumes varied between first-person and third-person narratives. Authors known to have contributed entries in the series are Michael Avallone, Valerie Moolman, Manning Lee Stokes, Dennis Lynds, Gayle Lynds, Robert J. Randisi, David Hagberg, and Martin Cruz Smith. The name Nick Carter was acknowledged by the series as having been inspired by the early 20th century pulp fiction detective of the same name in the 100th Killmaster volume (labelled Nick Carter 100) which included an essay on the earlier Nick Carter and included a Nick Carter detective short story alongside a Killmaster adventure.

The title character of the series serves as Agent N3 of AXE, a fictional spy agency for the United States government. The novels are similar to the literary James Bond novels—low on gadgets, high on action. Sexual encounters in particular are described in detail.

== The character ==
The definitive description of Nicholas J. Huntington Carter is given in the first novel in the series, Run, Spy, Run. Carter is tall, over 6ft (1.83 m), lean and handsome with a classic profile and magnificently muscled body. He has wide-set steel gray eyes that are icy, cruel and dangerous. He is hard-faced, with a firm straight mouth, laugh-lines around the eyes, and a firm cleft chin. His hair is thick and dark. He has a small tattoo of a blue axe on the inside right lower arm near the elbow—the ultimate ID for an AXE agent. At least one novel states that the tattoo glows in the dark. Carter also has a knife scar on the shoulder, a shrapnel scar on the right thigh. He has a sixth sense for danger.

Carter served as a soldier in World War II, then with the OSS, before he joined his current employer AXE.

Carter practices yoga for at least 15 minutes a day. Carter has a prodigious ability for learning foreign languages. He is fluent in English (his native tongue), Cantonese, French, German, Greek, Hungarian, Italian, Portuguese, Putonghua (Mandarin), Russian, Sanskrit, Spanish and Vietnamese. He has basic skills in Arabic, Hindi, Japanese, Korean, Romansch, Swahili, and Turkish. In the early novels, Carter often assumes a number of elaborate disguises in order to execute his missions.

== Weapons and paraphernalia ==
Nick Carter uses three main weapons during the course of the series, all of which are named, and have histories. The gun, Wilhelmina, is a stripped-down German Luger. In the earliest stories, Carter got the gun off a German officer during a harrowing mission during World War II. Later stories state that he has had a series of Lugers, all named Wilhelmina. The knife, Hugo, is a pearl-handled 400-year-old stiletto crafted by Benvenuto Cellini. The blade retracts into the handle, and the knife is worn on a special sheath on the wrist, designed to release it into the user's hand with a simple muscle contraction. The third member of the triad is Pierre, a poison gas bomb, which is a small egg-shaped device, usually carried in a pocket but sometimes as a "third testicle" at his scrotum. Activated with a simple twist, it would, within seconds, kill anyone or anything that breathed its potassium cyanide, an odorless and colorless gas.

Carter often takes with him other weapons as the mission demands. These have included:

- Cousin of Pierre: a smaller version of Pierre the poison gas bomb that can be concealed even more easily—described in The China Doll;
- Fang: a poison-tipped needle worn on a concealed index finger cap described in Saigon;
- Pepito: a non-lethal stun grenade used in Checkmate in Rio.
- Tiny Tim: a nuclear grenade "containing half a grain of sand of fissionable matter" used in Istanbul and The Red Guard
- 10,000-watt laser pistol used in Hanoi
- Cigarette lighter that fires drugged darts used in Hanoi
- Exploding cigars used in Hanoi

Carter has used a variety of equipment in the novels, most of which have nicknames. These have included:

- Antonio Moreno: a lifelike facemask made of a latex substance called Lastotex (apparently named after Antonio Moreno, the 1920s silent movie star);
- Gladstone: a rhino hide suitcase with multiple concealed compartments;
- Oscar Johnson: a small radio transmitter (unclear if it is named after Oscar Johnson, a baseball player active in the 1920s and 1930s, or Oscar G. Johnson, the World War II Medal of Honor recipient);
- Quantity K: a powerful acid strong enough to destroy evidence/documents;
- Laser torch: for burning through door locks used in The Weapon of Night;
- Singing Sam: a radio receiver concealed in electric razor/electric toothbrush used in Istanbul;
- Wristwatch with UHF transmitter used in Hanoi;
- Triple X tablet: a universal poison antidote and pep pill used in Hanoi;
- Talkalot: a scopolamine-like truth drug used in Danger Key;
- Unnamed injectable knockout drug requiring subsequent injection of antidote to regain consciousness used in The Weapon of Night;
- Store: an injectable drug that induces a week-long state of suspended animation used in Peking & The Tulip Affair

== AXE ==
The agency Carter works for is described as being smaller and far more secret than the CIA, mostly concerned with assassinations. In the first novel of the series, Run, Spy, Run, AXE is described as "the trouble-shooting arm of the US secret services". AXE headquarters are located in the 6th floor offices of a building in Dupont Circle, Washington, DC under the cover of the Amalgamated Press and Wire Service. AXE is purported to contain several different departments with specific functions including Editing (later called "Special Effects and Editing")—headed by Geoffrey Poindexter—which, among other things, creates false biographies for agents and provides appropriate props (e.g. fake latex fingerprints); Documents—whose role is to plant stories in the media to support specific activities and create false identification and travel documents; Records—which provides background information on suspects; and Operations—which provides logistic support for specific missions. AXE has a branch office near Columbus Circle, New York City and affiliate offices in countries around the world.

Agents are given code designations; Carter's N3, which has at least once been stated as standing for Number three, identifies him as one of the elite Killmasters. It has been stated in some novels that there are four Killmasters in AXE, with Carter the most senior. The meaning of the code N3 is described differently in different novels—sometimes it is Carter's personal designation, other times it is considered a rank, with N1 being the highest, while in other novels we are told that Carter is the third Killmaster to have worked for AXE, with both his predecessors having been killed in action.

- David Hawk, described in early novels as looking a lot like Uncle Sam, is the head of AXE and Carter's personal boss.
- Della Stokes, Hawk's personal secretary, is a character similar to Bond's Miss Moneypenny—flirtatious but serious.
- Ginger Bateman is Hawk's personal secretary in later novels.
- Geoffrey Poindexter, AXE's equivalent to Q, runs the Special Effects and Editing department; in charge of weapons, gadgets, disguises, and papers.

== AXE agents ==
In the first novel in the series (Run, Spy, Run), AXE is described as comprising 24 agents. They are identified by alpha-numeric code. The following agents/codes have been described:

| code | name | book | date |
|---|---|---|---|
| A2 | unnamed | Hanoi | 1966 |
| A4 | unnamed | Fraulein Spy | 1964 October |
| A7 | Alec Greenberg; based in AXE's London office | The Weapon of Night | 1967 |
| A12 | using pseudonym "Alfred" | Fraulein Spy | 1964 October |
| A24 | unnamed | Run, Spy, Run | 1964 February |
| B5 | unnamed | Hanoi | 1966 |
| B12 | unnamed, but nicknamed "Vitamin" | Fraulein Spy | 1964 October |
| C4 | unnamed | Fraulein Spy | 1964 October |
| D5 | Dan Eiger | based in Iraq, killed in The Weapon of Night | 1967 |
| E14 | Red Turner | A Bullet for Fidel | 1965 March |
| H19 | Hakim Sadek, Egyptian policeman and academic | The Weapon of Night | 1967 |
| K7 | unnamed | Run, Spy, Run | 1964 February |
| J2 | unnamed; briefs Carter on his trip to Japan | The China Doll | 1964 April |
| J20 | Jean Paul Turnier | The Terrible Ones | 1966 May |
| L32 | Hank Peterson | Operation Moon Rocket | 1968 |
| N1 | unnamed | stated killed in The Red Guard | 1967 |
| N1 | unnamed | stated killed in Temple of Fear | 1968 |
| N1 | Stuart Hample | The Peking Dossier | 1975 |
| N1 | David Hawk | in Trouble in Paradise | 1978 |
| N1 | Theodore Salonikos | dies in Hide And Go Die | 1983 |
| N2 | unnamed | stated killed in The Red Guard | 1967 |
| N2 | unnamed | stated killed in Temple of Fear | 1968 |
| N3 | Nick Carter | | |
| N4 | unnamed | stated killed in Temple of Fear | 1968 |
| N5 | unnamed; an inexperienced agent | Temple of Fear | 1968 |
| N5 | McLaughlin | Dr. Death | 1975 |
| N6 | Joe Banks | stated dead in Six Bloody Summer Days | 1975 |
| N6 or N7 | Tom Boxer | Macao | 1969 |
| N7 | Clay Vincent | Agent Counter-Agent | 1973 |
| N7 | unnamed | stated dead in Hide And Go Die | 1983 |
| N12 | John Sparks | Under the Wall | 1978 |
| N12 | unnamed | stated dead in Hide And Go Die | 1983 |
| N17 | Dennis Gordon | dies in The Golden Bull | 1981 |
| N17 | Bill Qualley | Hide And Go Die | 1983 |
| N30 | Kiki Pederson | dies in Trouble in Paradise | 1978 |
| N86 | Sean Singer | recruited in Hide And Go Die | 1983 |
| N92 | Penelope Taylor | knife trained by N86 in Ruby Red Death | 1990 |
| P3 | David Trainor | murdered in A Bullet for Fidel | 1965 March |
| P4 | unnamed, described as a mole in the Kremlin | Safari for Spies | 1964 August |
| P21 | Martha Ryerson | Rhodesia | 1968 |
| Q7 | Ellie Harmon | Hanoi | 1966 |
| Z4 | Zeke, works in the AXE Psycho Lab | Hanoi | 1966 |

== Novels ==
N.B.: The listing here is in series order (not necessarily by publication date, which is given)

1. Run, Spy, Run (Feb. 1964) A101F by Michael Avallone/Valerie Moolman
2. The China Doll (April 1964) A105F by Michael Avallone/Valerie Moolman
3. Checkmate in Rio (May 1964) A110F by Valerie Moolman
4. Safari for Spies (Aug. 1964) A114F by Valerie Moolman
5. Fraulein Spy (Oct. 1964) A118F by Valerie Moolman
6. Saigon (Dec. 1964) A122F by Michael Avallone/Valerie Moolman
7. A Bullet for Fidel (March 1965) A130F by Valerie Moolman
8. The 13th Spy (May 1965) A139F by Valerie Moolman
9. The Eyes of the Tiger (Sept. 1965) A152F by Manning Lee Stokes
10. Istanbul (Oct. 1965) A157F by Manning Lee Stokes
11. Web of Spies (Jan. 1966) A163F by Manning Lee Stokes
12. Spy Castle (Jan. 1966) A166F by Manning Lee Stokes
13. The Terrible Ones (May 1966) A172F by Valerie Moolman
14. Dragon Flame (May 1966) A173F by Manning Lee Stokes
15. Hanoi (1966) A182F by Valerie Moolman
16. Danger Key (1966) A183F by Lew Louderback
17. Operation Starvation (1966) A197F by Nicholas Browne
18. The Mind Poisoners (1966) A198F by Lionel White/Valerie Moolman
19. The Weapon of Night (1967) A215F by Valerie Moolman
20. The Golden Serpent (1967) A216F by Manning Lee Stokes
21. Mission to Venice (1967) A228X by Manning Lee Stokes
22. Double Identity (1967) A229X by Manning Lee Stokes
23. The Devil's Cockpit (1967) A238X by Manning Lee Stokes
24. The Chinese Paymaster (1967) A239X by Nicholas Browne
25. Seven Against Greece (Sept 1967) A247X by Nicholas Browne
26. A Korean Tiger (1967) A248X by Manning Lee Stokes
27. Assignment: Israel (1967) A260X by Manning Lee Stokes
28. The Red Guard (1967) A261X by Manning Lee Stokes
29. The Filthy Five (Nov 1967) A276X by Manning Lee Stokes
30. The Bright Blue Death (1967) A277X by Nicholas Browne
31. Macao (1968) A294X by Manning Lee Stokes
32. Operation Moon Rocket (1968) A295X by Lew Louderback
33. Judas Spy (April 1968) A325X by William L Rohde
34. Hood of Death (1968) A326X by William L Rohde
35. Amsterdam (1968) A366X by William L Rohde
36. Temple Of Fear (Oct 1968) A367X by Manning Lee Stokes
37. 14 Seconds to Hell (Nov 1968) A376X by Jon Messmann
38. The Defector (1969) A405X by George Snyder
39. Carnival for Killing (1969) A406X by Jon Messmann
40. Rhodesia (1968) A409X by William L Rohde
41. The Red Rays (1969) A423X by Manning Lee Stokes
42. Peking & The Tulip Affair (1969) A424X by Arnold Marmor
43. The Amazon (1969) A441X by Jon Messmann
44. Sea Trap (1969) A442X by Jon Messmann
45. Berlin (1969) A455X by Jon Messmann
46. The Human Time Bomb (July 1969) A456X by William L Rohde
47. The Cobra Kill (1969) A495X by Manning Lee Stokes
48. The Living Death (Sept. 1969) A496X by Jon Messmann
49. Operation Che Guevara (1969) A509X by Jon Messmann
50. The Doomsday Formula (Nov. 1969) A520X by Jon Messmann
51. Operation Snake (Dec. 1969) A559X by Jon Messmann
52. The Casbah Killers (1969) A560X by Jon Messmann
53. The Arab Plague (a.k.a. The Slavemaster in the U.K.) (Feb. 1970) A583X by Jon Messmann
54. Red Rebellion (1970) A584X by Jon Messmann
55. The Executioners (April 1970) A598X by Jon Messmann
56. Black Death (March 1970) A631X by Manning Lee Stokes
57. Mind Killers (1970) A655X by Jon Messmann
58. Time Clock of Death (June 1970) A656X by George Snyder
59. Cambodia (1970) A686X by George Snyder
60. The Death Strain (Aug. 1970) A703S by Jon Messmann
61. Moscow (1970) A710S by George Snyder
62. Jewel of Doom (1970) A744S by George Snyder
63. Ice Bomb Zero (March 1971) A787S by George Snyder
64. Mark of Cosa Nostra (1971) A847S by George Snyder
65. The Cairo Mafia (Aug. 1972) AN1001 by Ralph Eugene Hayes
66. Inca Death Squad (Sept. 1972) AN1016 by Martin Cruz Smith
67. Assault on England (Oct. 1972) AN1030 by Ralph Eugene Hayes
68. The Omega Terror (Nov. 1972) AN1033 by Ralph Eugene Hayes
69. Code Name: Werewolf (Jan. 1973) AN1055 by Martin Cruz Smith
70. Strike Force Terror (1972) AN1056 by Ralph Eugene Hayes
71. Target: Doomsday Island (Feb. 1973) AN1075 By Richard Hubbard
72. Night of the Avenger (April 1973) AN1079 by Chet Cunningham
73. Butcher of Belgrade (April 1973) AN1109 by Ralph Eugene Hayes / Larry Powell
74. Assassination Brigade (April 1973) AN1121 by Thomas Chastain
75. The Liquidator (1973) AN1127 by Richard Hubbard
76. The Devil's Dozen (1973) AN1133 by Martin Cruz Smith
77. The Code (1973) AN1146 by Larry Powell
78. Agent Counter-Agent (July 1973) AN1147 by Ralph Eugene Hayes
79. Hour of the Wolf (Aug. 1973) AN1157 by Jeffrey Wallman
80. Our Agent in Rome is Missing (1973) AN1160 by Al Hine
81. The Kremlin File (Sept. 1973) AN1165 by Willis T Ballard
82. Spanish Connection (Sept. 1973) AN1166 by Bruce Cassidy
83. Death's Head Conspiracy (1973) AN1178 by Robert Colby
84. The Peking Dossier (Dec. 1973) AN1217 by Linda Stewart
85. Ice-trap Terror (1974) AN1227 by Jeffrey Wallman
86. Assassin: Code Name Vulture (Jan. 1974) AN1239 by Ralph Eugene Hayes
87. Massacre in Milan (March 1974) AN1251 by Al Hine
88. Vatican Vendetta (1974) AN1263 by George Snyder / Ralph Eugene Hayes
89. Sign of the Cobra (1974) AN1270 by James Fritxhand
90. The Man Who Sold Death (1974) AN1297 by Lawrence Van Gelder
91. The N3 Conspiracy (Aug. 1974) AQ1332 by Dennis Lynds
92. Beirut Incident (1974) AQ1333 by Forrest V Perrin
93. Death of the Falcon (1974) AQ1354 by Jim Bowser
94. The Aztec Avenger (1974) AQ1356 by Saul Wernick
95. The Jerusalem File (1975)AQ1400 by Linda Stewart
96. Dr. Death (1975) AY1424 by Craig Nova
97. Counterfeit Agent (1975) AQ1439 by Douglas Marland
98. Six Bloody Summer Days (1975) AQ1449 by DeWitt S Copp
99. The Z Document (1975) AQ1460 by Homer H Morris
100. The Katmandu Contract (1975)AQ1479 by Jim Bowser
101. The Ultimate Code (1975) AQ1486 by William Odell
102. Assignment: Intercept (1976) AQ1512 by Marilyn Granbeck
103. Green Wolf Connection (1976) AQ1546 by Dennis Lynds
104. Death Message: Oil 74-2 (1976) AQ1559 by Dee Stuart / Ansel Chapin
105. The List (1976) AQ1556 by Jim Bowser
106. The Fanatics of Al Asad (1976) AQ1575 by Saul Wernick
107. The Snake Flag Conspiracy (1976) AQ1576 by Saul Wernick
108. The Turncoat (1976) AQ1581 by Leon Lazarus
109. The Sign of the Prayer Shawl (1976) AQ1590 by David Hagberg
110. The Vulcan Disaster (1976) AQ1600 by George Warren
111. A High Yield in Death (1976) AQ1609 by Jim Bowser
112. The Nichovev Plot (1976) AQ1623 by Craig Nova
113. Triple Cross (1976) AQ1636 by Dennis Lynds
114. The Gallagher Plot (1976) AQ1647 by Saul Wernick
115. Plot for the Fourth Reich (Jan. 1977) AQ1655 by Bob Latona
116. Revenge of the Generals (June 1978) (AQ1664 Feb 1977 Cancelled) by Saul Wernick
117. Under the Wall (July 1978) (AQ1673 March 1977 cancelled) by DeWitt S Copp
118. The Ebony Cross (Aug. 1978) AQ1683 (April 1977 cancelled) by Jack Canon
119. Deadly Doubles (Sept. 1978) (AQ1695 May 1977 cancelled) by Lawrence Van Gelder
120. Race of Death (Oct. 1978) by David Hagberg
121. Trouble in Paradise (Nov. 1978) by Robert Derek Steeley
122. Pamplona Affair (Dec. 1978) by Dee Stuart/Ansel Chapin
123. The Doomsday Spore (Jan. 1979) by George Warren
124. The Asian Mantrap (Feb. 1979) by William Odell
125. Thunderstrike in Syria (March 1979) By Joseph Rosenberger
126. The Redolmo Affair (April 1979) by Jack Canon
127. The Jamaican Exchange (May 1979) by Leon Lazarus
128. Tropical Deathpact (June 1979) by Bob Stokesberry
129. The Pemex Chart (July 1979) by Dwight V Swain
130. Hawaii (Sept. 1979) by Daniel C Prince
131. The Satan Trap (Oct. 1979) by Jack Canon
132. Reich Four (Nov. 1979) by Fred Huber
133. The Nowhere Weapon (Dec. 1979) by William Odell
134. Strike Of The Hawk (Jan 1980) by Joseph L Gilmore
135. Day Of The Dingo (April 1980) by John Stevenson
136. And Next The King (May 1980) by Steve Simmons
137. Tarantula Strike (June 1980) by Dan Reardon
138. Ten Times Dynamite (July 1980) by Frank Adduci jr
139. Eighth Card Stud (Aug. 1980) by Robert E. Vardeman
140. Suicide Seat (Sept. 1980) by George Warren
141. Death Mission: Havana (Oct. 1980) by Ron Felber
142. War From The Clouds (Nov. 1980) by Joseph L Gilmore
143. Turkish Bloodbath (Dec. 1980) by Jerry Ahern
144. The Coyote Connection (Feb. 1981) by Bill Crider/Jack Davis
145. The Q Man (March 1981) by John Stevenson
146. The Society Of Nine (April 1981) by Jack Canon
147. The Ouster Conspiracy (May 1981) by David Hagberg
148. The Golden Bull (June 1981) by John Stevenson
149. The Dubrovnik Massacre (July 1981) by Henry Rasof/Stephen Williamson
150. The Solar Menace (Aug. 1981) by Robert E. Vardeman
151. The Strontium Code (Sept. 1981) by David Hagberg
152. Pleasure Island (Oct. 1981) by Robert J Randisi
153. Cauldron Of Hell (Nov. 1981) by Mike Jahn
154. The Parisian Affair (Dec. 1981) by H Edward Husenburger
155. Chessmaster (Jan. 1982) by Robert J Randisi
156. The Last Samurai (Feb. 1982) by Bruce Algozin
157. The Puppet Master (March 1982) by David Hagberg
158. The Dominican Affair (March 1982) by David Hagberg
159. The Damocles Threat (March 1982) by David Hagberg
160. Earth Shaker (March 1982) by Robert E. Vardeman
161. The Treason Game (March 1982) by Joseph L Gilmore
162. Deathlight (March 1982) by Jerry Ahern
163. The Israeli Connection (March 1982) by Robert Derek Steeley
164. Norwegian Typhoon (April 1982) by Robert E. Vardeman
165. The Hunter (May 1982) by David Hagberg
166. Operation: McMurdo Sound (June 1982) by David Hagberg
167. Appointment In Haiphong (July 1982) by David Hagberg
168. Retreat For Death (Aug. 1982) by David Hagberg
169. The Mendoza Manuscript (Sept. 1982) by Robert J Randisi
170. The Death Star Affair (Oct. 1982) by Jack Canon
171. Doctor DNA (Nov. 1982) by Robert E. Vardeman
172. The Christmas Kill (Jan. 1983) by Joseph L Gilmore
173. The Greek Summit (Feb. 1983) by Robert J Randisi
174. The Outback Ghosts (March 1983) by Robert E. Vardeman
175. Hide And Go Die (April 1983) by Jack Canon
176. The Kali Death Cult (May 1983) by Robert E. Vardeman
177. Operation Vendetta (June 1983) by Joseph L Gilmore
178. The Yukon Target (July 1983) by Robert E. Vardeman
179. The Death Dealer (Aug. 1983) by Jack Canon
180. The Istanbul Decision (Sept. 1983) by David Hagberg
181. The Decoy Hit (Oct. 1983) by Robert J Randisi
182. Earthfire North (Nov. 1983) by David Hagberg
183. The Budapest Run (Dec. 1983) by Jack Canon
184. Caribbean Coup (Jan. 1984) by Robert J Randisi
185. The Algarve Affair (Feb. 1984) by Jack Canon
186. Zero-Hour Strike Force (March 1984) by David Hagberg
187. Operation Sharkbite (April 1984) by Jack Canon
188. Death Island (May 1984) by David Hagberg
189. Night of the Warheads (June 1984) by Jack Canon
190. Day of the Mahdi (July 1984) by Gayle Lynds
191. Assignment: Rio (August 1984) by Jack Canon
192. Death Hand Play (Sept. 1984) by David Hagberg
193. The Kremlin Kill (Oct. 1984) Jack Canon
194. The Mayan Connection (Nov. 1984) by Gayle Lynds
195. San Juan Inferno (Dec. 1984) by Joseph L Gilmore
196. Circle of Scorpions (Jan. 1985) by Jack Canon
197. The Blue Ice Affair (Feb. 1985) by Ron Felber
198. The Macao Massacre (March 1985) by Jack Canon
199. Pursuit of the Eagle (April 1985) by Gayle Lynds
200. The Vengeance Game (May 1985) by David Hagberg
201. Last Flight to Moscow (June 1985) by Joseph L Gilmore
202. The Normandy Code (July 1985) by Jack Canon
203. White Death (Aug. 1985) by Gayle Lynds
204. The Assassin Convention (Sept. 1985) by Joseph L Gilmore
205. Blood of the Scimitar (Oct. 1985) by Jack Canon
206. The Execution Exchange (Nov. 1985) by Dennis Lynds
207. The Tarlov Cipher (Dec. 1985) by Jack Canon
208. Target Red Star (Jan. 1986) by Jack Canon
209. The Killing Ground (Jan. 1986) by David Hagberg
210. The Berlin Target (Feb. 1986) by Jack Canon
211. Mercenary Mountain (March 1986) by Dennis Lynds
212. Blood Ultimatum (April 1986) by Ron Felber
213. The Cyclops Conspiracy (May 1986) by Dennis Lynds
214. Tunnel for Traitors (June 1986) by Jack Canon
215. The Samurai Kill (July 1986) by Dennis Lynds
216. Terror Times Two (Aug. 1986) by Jack Canon
217. Death Orbit (Sept. 1986) by David Hagberg
218. Slaughter Day (Oct. 1986) by Jack Canon
219. The Master Assassin (Nov. 1986) by Dennis Lynds
220. Operation Petrograd (Dec. 1986) by David Hagberg
221. Crossfire Red (Jan. 1987) by Jack Canon
222. Blood of the Falcon (Feb. 1987) By Dennis Lynds
223. Death Squad (March 1987) by Jack Canon
224. The Terror Code (April 1987) by Jack Canon
225. Holy War (May 1987) by Jack Canon
226. Blood Raid (June 1987) by Jack Canon
227. East of Hell (July 1987) by David Hagberg
228. Killing Games (Aug. 1987) by Jack Canon
229. Terms of Vengeance (Sept. 1987) by Jack Canon
230. Pressure Point (Oct. 1987) by Jack Garside
231. Night of the Condor (Nov. 1987) by Gardner F. Fox
232. The Poseidon Target (Dec. 1987) by Jack Canon
233. The Andropov File (Jan. 1988) by Jack Garside
234. Dragonfire (Feb. 1988) by David Hagberg
235. Bloodtrail to Mecca (March 1988) by Jack Canon
236. Deathstrike (April 1988) by Jack Garside
237. Lethal Prey (May 1988) by David Hagberg
238. Spykiller (June 1988) by David Hagberg
239. Bolivian Heat (July 1988) by Jack Canon
240. The Rangoon Man (Aug. 1988) by Jack Canon
241. Code Name Cobra (Sept. 1988) by Jack Garside
242. Afgan Intercept (Oct. 1988) by Jack Garside
243. Countdown to Armageddon (Nov. 1988) by Jack Canon
244. Black Sea Bloodbath (Dec. 1988) by Jack Garside
245. The Deadly Diva (Jan. 1989) by Jack Canon
246. Invitation to Death (Feb. 1989) by David Hagberg
247. Day of the Assassin (March 1989) by Jack Canon
248. The Korean Kill (April 1989) Jack Canon
249. Middle East Massacre (May 1989) by Jack Canon
250. Sanction to Slaughter (June 1989) by Jack Garside
251. Holiday in Hell (July 1989) by Jack Canon
252. Law of the Lion (Aug. 1989) by Shelly Loewenkopf
253. Hong Kong Hit (Sept. 1989) by Jack Canon
254. Deep Sea Death (Oct. 1989) by Jack Garside
255. Arms of Vengeance (Nov. 1989) by Shelly Loewenkopf
256. Hell-Bound Express (Dec. 1989) by Jack Canon
257. Isle of Blood (Jan. 1990) by Jack Canon
258. Singapore Sling (Feb. 1990) by Jack Garside
259. Ruby Red Death(March 1990) by Jack Garside
260. Arctic Abduction (April 1990) by Jack Garside
261. Dragon Slay (May 1990) by Jack Canon

== See also ==
- Death Merchant
- The Destroyer (novel series)
- The Executioner
- Mack Bolan
