= Hanoi (disambiguation) =

Hanoi is the capital of Vietnam.

Hanoi may also refer to:

- Hanoï (album), 2007 Indochine album
- Hanoi (novel), a 1966 spy novel
- Hanoi Beer, a brand of beer
- Hanoi Productions, producer of 2022 TV series Visions

== See also ==
- Hanoi Hannah (1931–2016), a Vietnamese radio personality known for her work during the Vietnam War
- Tower of Hanoi, a one-player game of strategy
