= Web of Spies =

1966 novel by Manning Lee Stokes

First edition

Web of Spies is the 11th novel in the long-running Nick Carter-Killmaster series of spy novels. Carter is a US secret agent, code-named N-3, with the rank of Killmaster. He works for AXE – a secret arm of the US intelligence services.

== Publishing history ==
The book was first published in January 1966 (Number A163F) by Award Books part of the Beacon-Signal division of Universal Publishing and Distributing Corporation (New York, USA), part of the Conde Nast Publications Inc. The novel was written by Manning Lee Stokes.

== Plot summary ==
The story is set in September 1965. Carter is assigned to Mission Sappho – to kidnap British scientist Alicia Todd – holidaying on the Costa Brava with her Russian spy lover – or kill her if she resists. Todd has developed a secret formula known as the Paradise Pill which has the ability to greatly enhance a soldier's morale and stamina. However, Todd has not left any written records of the formula and has committed the details to memory.

First, Carter contacts AXE agent Gay Lord in Tangier, Morocco. She knows where Todd is staying from her dealings with die Spinne (The Spider) – a Spanish underground group who smuggle Nazis out of Europe. Gay Lord kept tabs on the current whereabouts of the smuggled Nazis and reported back to AXE. The Spider has recently fragmented into two factions – the largest led by Judas – Carter's adversary in Run, Spy, Run and The China Doll. Gay Lord was a double agent; doctoring her reports to AXE about the location of the Nazis in exchange for cash to fund her extravagant lifestyle. The smaller faction of The Spider (led by El Lobo) discovered her involvement and killed her.

Carter escapes from Tangier and travels to a villa near L'Estartit on the Costa Brava where Russian agent Tasia Loften is seducing Alicia Todd. Carter discovers that Judas' men will raid the villa and attempt to kidnap Todd. Carter arrives at the villa just as it is besieged by Judas' men. Carter arranges a truce with the Russian spy in exchange for help in escaping the villa. Under the influence of narcotics, Todd panics and bolts and is captured by Judas.

Carter and Tasia join forces to evade capture and rescue Todd. They are summoned to meet Judas at the bullfighting arena in Girona where he intends to sell Todd to the highest bidder. Tasia knows that Russia will be outbid by the Americans so she plants heroin on Carter causing him to be arrested on suspicion of drug trafficking before he can complete a deal with Judas.

Tasia follows Judas to a monastery near La Jonquera / Prats-de-Mollo-la-Preste on the France-Spain border where Todd is imprisoned. Carter is rescued from the police cells by the smaller Spider group led by Carmena Santos – El Lobo's granddaughter. They want Carter's help to kill Judas and reunite the two Spider factions.

Carter leads the assault on the monastery; he is to disable the electric fence, machine gun posts and searchlights to allow El Lobo's men to enter. Inside the monastery, Tasia secretly contacts a Russian commando outpost in nearby Andorra to come to her assistance. Carter betrays El Lobo's men by signaling that all is clear when in fact he has not disabled the monastery's security systems. El Lobo and his men attack and a vicious firefight with Judas' forces ensues during which Carmena Santos is killed.

The Russian commandos arrive and join the assault on the monastery. Sensing that the end is near, Judas imprisons Carter and Tasia in a sealed coffin perched on the monastery walls ready to be tipped into the moat and makes his escape with Alicia Todd by river. Carter and Tasia escape from the coffin and follow Judas. Judas and Todd are tipped into the water approaching some rapids and scramble to the river bank. Judas bargains with Carter – his freedom in exchange for Todd. Carter agrees but finds that Todd is already dead. Judas escapes in Carter's car which is attacked by El Lobo's men seeking revenge for the causing the death of Carmena. Judas is presumed to be dead.

After escaping a manhunt by the Spanish police and military, Carter and Tasia take refuge in Barcelona. Carter discovers that Tasia succeeded in extracting some information from Todd before her death and takes it from her. He leaves her some money and tells her she must choose to defect or return to Russia.

Back in the US, Carter learns that Tasia has returned to Russia but her fate is unknown. The information she extracted from Todd was examined by experts and found to be worthless.

== Main characters ==
- Nick Carter (agent N-3, AXE; posing as author Kenneth Ludwell Hughes)
- Mr Hawk (Carter's boss, head of AXE)
- Tasia Loften (real name: Anastasia Zaloff; Russian agent posing as Todd's lover)
- Alicia Todd (English pharmacologist)
- Judas (leader of die Spinne, Carter's foe)
- Skull (Judas' henchman)
- El Lobo (leader of smaller faction of die Spinne)
- Carmena Santos (die Spinne member, granddaughter of El Lobo)
- Gay Lord (AXE agent based in Morocco)
