= Living Death =

(The) Living Death may refer to:

- Living Death (film), a 2009 South Korean horror film
- Living Death (band), a German heavy metal band
- The Living Death (film), a 1915 American short film
- The Living Death (novel), a 1969 novel in the Nick Carter-Killmaster series
