= Checkmate in Rio =

1964 novel

First edition

Checkmate in Rio is the third novel in the long-running Nick Carter-Killmaster series.

== Publishing history ==
The book was first published in May 1964 (Number A110F) by Award Books part of the Beacon-Signal division of Universal Publishing and Distributing Corporation (New York, USA), part of the Conde Nast Publications Inc. The novel was written by Valerie Moolman. Copyright was registered in the US on 17 May 1964.

== Plot summary ==
The story takes place in January 1964. After the events described in The China Doll, six AXE agents based in Rio de Janeiro, Brazil, have been found mutilated and murdered in a short space of time. Nick Carter (undercover as shady millionaire businessman Robert Milbank) accompanied by fellow agent Rosalind Adler (posing as Milbank’s mistress, Rosita Montez) are sent to investigate. Carter (as Milbank) uses his apparent wealth and influence to enter the higher social circles in Rio de Janeiro and quickly meets socialite Carla Langley – wife of one of the missing agents. Next, posing as American journalist, Michael Nolan, Carter interviews the wife of Joao de Santos, a local investigative reporter, and another of the missing agents. Meanwhile, Agent Adler investigates the background of missing agent Carlos Brenha, assistant curator at a local museum. As a result of their probing, a seedy nightclub quickly becomes the focus of attention. In the club’s basement, Carter discovers a cache of illegal weapons imported from China. Carter is knocked out and imprisoned in the club basement. The ringleader is revealed to be Carla Langley who is working for communist China to import illegal arms and execute minor spies in the hope that a special agent (i.e. Carter) would be sent to investigate and whom they intend to torture and kill to extract valuable information. Carter is tied to a rack and beaten but manages to escape. Rosalind Adler arrives in the nick of time and overpowers the guards with a non-lethal gas bomb (nicknamed Pepito). Carter executes the club owner and second-in-command (Luis Silveiro) and is about to do the same to Carla Langley when he discovers the gas bomb has rendered her an insane, gibbering wreck. He leaves her screaming in the night.

== Main characters ==
- Nick Carter (agent N-3, AXE, undercover using the assumed names Robert Milbank, Michael Nolan)
- Mr Hawk (Carter’s boss, head of AXE)
- Carla Langley (socialite, wife of missing AXE agent - Pierce Langley, Carter's adversary)
- Rosalind Adler (Carter's assistant, undercover using the assumed names Rosita Montez, Marlene Webster)
- Luis Silveiro (nightclub owner, Carla Langley's deputy, Carter's adversary)
- Perez Cabral (financier husband of missing AXE agent - Maria Cabral)
- Luisa Cabral (daughter of Maria Cabral, step-daughter of Perez Cabral)
