= The Executioners (Killmaster novel) =

1970 novel by Jon Messmann

The Executioners is the 55th novel in the Nick Carter-Killmaster series of spy novels. Carter is a US secret agent, code-named N-3, with the rank of Killmaster. He works for AXE – a secret arm of the US intelligence services.

== Publishing history ==
The book was first published in April 1970 by Award-Tandem Books (Number A598X) by Universal Publishing and Distributing Corporation (New York, USA) and Universal-Tandem Publishing Co. Ltd. (London, England). Copyright was registered on 15 April 1970. The novel was written by Jon Messmann.,

== Plot summary ==
The story is set in late 1969. Several allied armed forces exercises led by Australia have ended badly. Australia's allies are concerned about incompetence or sabotage. AXE Chief, David Hawk, sends agent Nick Carter to Australia to investigate. The three incidents under investigation feature disgruntled servicemen in prominent roles. The servicemen in question all have connections to The Ruddy Jug pub in Townsville, Queensland. Carter confronts one of the suspects – now dismissed from service. The man panics and makes contact with Judy Hennicker at The Ruddy Jug. Carter investigates the pub and is followed and attacked but manages to escape.

A suspect involved in another incident is killed in suspicious circumstances before Carter can interview him. The third suspect, an airforce pilot, agrees to talk to Carter alone whilst on a training flight. However, the pilot ejects Carter over the Outback and leaves him to die of thirst and exposure.

With help from Aboriginal Australians Carter survives and makes it back to Townsville. Carter follows up a lead from The Ruddy Jug to an isolated Outback ranch. He discovers that Chinese communists are organising the sabotage with help from an unidentified female. Carter's suspects include Lynn Delba – one of the deceased servicemen's wives; barmaid – Judy Hennicker; and Mona Star – secretary to Major Rothwell of Australian Intelligence.

Carter pretends he has been recalled to the US on urgent business. In the meantime, he disguises himself as Tim Anderson – a local construction worker – and begins to frequent The Ruddy Jug. He lets on that he is working on a nearby dam being built by a US company and is unhappy with his pay and conditions. Judy puts him in contact with Bonard – recruiter for the saboteurs. Soon Carter is offered a substantial sum to sabotage the dam construction – in the hope that it would further strain US-Australian cooperation. Carter insists on settling the deal with the top man in the organization. He is led to a meeting with Mona Star.

Led immediately to the construction site to commence sabotage operations, Carter succeeds in killing several henchmen but Mona and the Chinese paymaster escape. Carter discovers that they have an underwater base on the Great Barrier Reef near Townsville.

Carter calls Hawk and asks for help. The US Navy has a submarine in the Coral Sea which is put on standby. Carter and Judy investigate likely sites on the reef near Townsville. Just off Magnetic Island they discover a large underwater base disguised with fake coral. Carter calls in the coordinates and the US submarine is ordered to destroy it with torpedoes.

In the meantime, Carter is captured by Chinese frogmen and taken aboard the underwater base. Mona reveals her hatred of the British for destroying the career of her army officer father. She also reveals that the real Mona Star was murdered en route from Britain after receiving security clearance to work for Australian Intelligence. As the torpedoes strike Carter and Mona escape from the underwater base. Carter tries to save Mona but she deliberately swims into the path of a group of sharks and is eaten alive.

Carter returns to shore and finds Judy waiting for him. He returns to Townsville to recover.

== Main characters ==
- Nick Carter – agent N-3, AXE (posing Tim Anderson – construction worker)
- David Hawk – head of AXE; Carter's boss
- Major Alan Rothwell, KCB – head, Australian Intelligence
- Mona Star – Rothwell's secretary; Chinese agent (Caroline Cheng)
- Judy Hennicker – barmaid
- Bonard – recruiter for saboteurs
- Lynn Delba – ex-wife of saboteur
