= The Terrible Ones (novel) =

1966 novel by Valerie Moolman

The Terrible Ones is the 13th novel in the long-running Nick Carter-Killmaster series of spy novels. Carter is a US secret agent, code-named N-3, with the rank of Killmaster. He works for AXE – a secret arm of the US intelligence services.

== Publishing history ==
The book was first published in May 1966 (Number A172F) by Award Books, part of the Beacon-Signal division of Universal Publishing and Distributing Corporation (New York, USA), part of the Conde Nast Publications Inc. It was written by Valerie Moolman. Copyright was registered on 1 June 1966.

== Plot summary ==
Nick Carter is sent to the Republic of Haiti to assist a group of rebels from neighboring Dominican Republic called The Terrible Ones. Led by Paula Martelo, The Terrible Ones are the widows of men executed for plotting to overthrow former Dominican dictator Rafael Trujillo. Carter also has to investigate the nature of Operation Blast and stop it.

The Terrible Ones are searching for a US$100 million ($700 million in 2012) horde of gold and precious stones reputedly hidden by Trujillo. Also searching for the Trujillo Treasure is Dr Tsing-fu Shu, a Chinese communist intelligence officer. The location of the treasure has been encoded in a series of separate clues known only to a handful of Trujillo's most trusted advisers. Based on one of the clues supposedly referring to a castle or fortress of some kind, Tsing-fu is conducting excavations in the dungeons of the Citadelle Laferriere in Haiti. If discovered, the treasure will enable the Chinese to fund Operation Blast and make Haiti a puppet state under the control of China.

Carter and Paula Martelo discover that the Citadelle is not the location of the buried treasure and head for Santo Domingo in the Dominican Republic. They arrive at the secret headquarters of The Terrible Ones and find it has been captured by three Cuban fidelistas. Carter is tied up and interrogated but escapes by using Pierre – the poison gas bomb. With the help of The Terrible Ones, he plants the bodies of the fidelistas in the Chinese restaurant in Santo Domingo used as a front by Tsing-fu and retrieves a map showing the locations of planned short-range missile bases dotted around the Caribbean designed to control the sea passages and restrict US shipping – the true nature of Operation Blast.

Carter asks The Terrible Ones to search through their husbands' belongings for possible clues to the location of the treasure. Eventually, the location is identified as the "Valley of the Shadow" – a small dark valley on the outskirts of Santo Domingo in which an obscure sect of black-cowled monks have built a fortified monastery.

Carter and eight of The Terrible Ones go to investigate. The monastery has been attacked and overrun by Tsing-fu and his soldiers who have also discovered the true location of the treasure by tracking down and torturing former Trujillo aides. After a fierce firefight, Carter kills Tsing-fu and his men. The treasure has been sealed up inside the body of a huge plaster saint in the monastery chapel. The abbot gives up the treasure to The Terrible Ones.

As Carter and a few of The Terrible Ones try to leave the valley with the treasure they are ambushed by Cuban fidelistas. Paula is killed and Carter is wounded. The attackers are all killed. Carter recovers in hospital treasuring a ruby ring once owned by Paula.

== Main characters ==
- Nick Carter (agent N-3, AXE)
- Mr Hawk (Carter's boss, head of AXE)
- Paula Martelo (leader of The Terrible Ones)
- Dr Tsing-fu Shu (sub-chief, Chinese Intelligence; Carter's foe)
- Mao-Pei (subordinate of Dr Shu)
- Tom Kee (subordinate of Dr Shu)
- Shang (manservant of Dr Shu)
