= Istanbul (novel) =

1965 novel by Manning Lee Stokes

First edition

Istanbul is the tenth novel in the long-running Nick Carter-Killmaster series of spy novels. Carter is a US secret agent, code-named N-3, with the rank of Killmaster. He works for AXE – a secret arm of the US intelligence services.

== Publishing history ==
The book was first published in October 1965 (Number A157F) by Award Books part of the Beacon-Signal division of Universal Publishing and Distributing Corporation (New York, USA), part of the Conde Nast Publications Inc. The novel was written by Manning Lee Stokes.

== Plot summary ==
The story is set in May 1965. Several Federal Bureau of Narcotics (FBN) agents have been murdered in Turkey. Carter attends a secret meeting in which a top US Government official orders him to assassinate four individuals believed to be involved in protecting an international heroin processing and distribution network based in Turkey. Carter accepts the mission and makes his way to Istanbul posing as a crewman on a cargo freighter.

Carter makes contact with fellow AXE agent Charles “Mousy” Morgan stationed in Istanbul. Mija Gialellis, a former heroin addict, is being held in AXE custody in order to provide information on how to penetrate the opium smuggling syndicate. Morgan tracks Maurice Defarge – one of the four assassination targets – to the Le Cinema Bleu where he is known to the owner Leslie Standish. Carter and Morgan visit Le Cinema Bleu intending to seize Standish and interrogate her at AXE's Istanbul office. They observe Marion Talbot, Defarge's secretary, enter the club's back office. Carter follows and finds Standish dead in her office – her throat cut in the same way as the murdered FBN agents. A peculiar smell – acetone – fills the air. Carter encounters and fights Johnny Ruthless – one of the other assassination targets – but cannot capture or kill him. A few minutes later, Carter finds Morgan outside the club with his throat cut.

Now undercover, Carter and Mija take a room in a hotel overlooking Defarge's business headquarters. Carter breaks in at night and confronts the obese Defarge. The shock of the encounter induces a heart attack in Defarge and Carter extracts the date and route of the next opium shipment before leaving Defarge to expire apparently from natural causes. Carter further learns that the Turkish syndicate has sold the opium processing equipment to communist Chinese interests for 10 million Turkish pounds (then about US$1 million) (about US$7.8 million in 2011). Again Carter smells acetone.

Carter and Mija are parachuted into Urfa (Sanliurfa, Edessa, Mesopotamia) close to the border with Syria to intercept the opium caravan and kill the second target, Gonzalez. The caravan is protected by 100 Kurdish tribesmen. Carter poses as a Kurd to infiltrate the caravan but is exposed and captured. He manages to escape and lies in wait for Gonzalez as he crosses a river separating Turkey from Syria. As the caravan approaches Carter sets off Tiny Tim – a small atomic grenade. A badly injured Gonzalez survives. He shows Carter a bag containing Mija's severed head – cut off by the Kurdish bodyguards. Carter strangles Gonzalez. Carter passes out from his injuries and awakes in the sanatorium of Dr Joseph Six – former Nazi doctor who experimented on prisoners in extermination camps.

Dr Six gives Carter a fatal dose of morphine and leaves him alone to die. Carter vomits up the morphine and dives out the hospital window into the Bosphorus. Carter immediately returns to the sanatorium and kills Dr Six and his cronies with Pierre – the poison gas bomb. Carter leaves the sanatorium and is picked up on his way back to the city center by Tessa Travis – apparently a bored and lonely businessman's wife – who takes him back to her villa.

In the bathroom, Carter finds acetone nail polish remover – the distinctive smell of which he recalled from the Le Cinema Bleu and Defarge's office. Carter realizes that Tessa Travis is Marion Talbot and Johnny Ruthless – responsible for the murders of the FBN agents, Leslie Standish and “Mousy” Morgan. Travis is a communist agent acting for China and has arranged the takeover of the opium syndicate killing everyone who gets in her way. She pulls a knife on Carter and they struggle. She falls on the blade and dies. Carter has eliminated all four targets. He recuperates in Turkey before returning to the USA.

== Main characters ==
- Nick Carter (agent N-3, AXE; posing as Thomas J. Norris, Grover Stout, John R Thomson)
- Mr Hawk (Carter's boss, head of AXE)
- Maurice Defarge (opium syndicate member)
- Carlos Gonzalez (opium syndicate member
- Dr. Joseph Six (former Nazi extermination camp doctor; opium syndicate member)
- Johnny Ruthless (aka Marion Talbot – Defarge's secretary; Tessa Travis; opium syndicate member)
- Charles “Mousy” Morgan (AXE Istanbul section leader)
- Mija Gialellis
