= Peking & The Tulip Affair =

1969 novel by Arnold Marmor

First edition

Peking & The Tulip Affair is the 42nd novel in the long-running Nick Carter-Killmaster series of spy novels. Carter is a US secret agent, code-named N-3, with the rank of Killmaster. He works for AXE – a secret arm of the US intelligence services.

== Publishing history ==
The book was first published in 1969 by Award-Tandem Books (Number A424X [Award / T180 [Tandem]) by Universal Publishing and Distributing Corporation (New York, USA) and Universal-Tandem Publishing Co. Ltd. (London, England). The novel was written by Arnold Marmor. Copyright was registered on 7 April 1969.

== Peking plot summary ==
Walter Kerner, a German scientist and associate of Martin Bormann, is in Peking synthesizing a novel compound derived from belladonna called Agent Z, which is capable of inducing psychosis. His mistress, Sim Chan, is an intelligence agent spying on him for the Chinese government.

Carter is ordered to stop production of the drug and eliminate Bormann. Carter, posing as Canadian journalist Harry Toombs, travels to Peking via Hong Kong, where he meets Hans Danzig – another German chemist. Danzig explains the danger posed by Agent Z and tells Carter it is only effective if injected. Carter leaves his usual weapons (luger, stiletto and gas bomb) behind. His only weapon is Store – another injectable drug, developed by Danzig that induces a week-long state of deathlike suspended animation. Danzig suspects the secret laboratory producing Agent Z is close to Peking.

Carter flies to Peking and goes to meet his contact. His contact has been murdered but he meets Lotus, his contact's daughter, who is a prostitute. Although estranged from her father on account of her profession she is aware of Carter's mission. Some of the German scientists are her clients. She arranges for Carter to enter the Imperial Palace where Bormann and the scientists are stationed.

Carter attempts to assassinate Bormann but manages only to inject two sleeping Germans with Store. He persuades Lotus to lure a German to her flat the next night where Carter will be lying in wait. Carter tortures the man into revealing the location of the laboratory where Agent Z is made.

Carter and Lotus drive to the laboratory complex 100 miles from Peking. Carter is captured and taken inside the camp. Lotus enters disguised as a guard. Kerner and Sim Chan decide to test Agent Z on Carter. Carter convinces Sim Chan that Kerner and the Germans are using the Chinese to create a new Germany and that they will never hand over Agent Z to them. Carter is injected and apparently dies instantly. Two guards remove his body. A furious Sim Chan stabs Kerner to death for his treachery then drives to Peking to confront Bormann.

Lotus kills the other guard and revives Carter with the antidote to Store, which she had managed to switch with Agent Z in the laboratory. Carter returns to the lab and starts a fire with some chemicals.

Bormann sends Captain Stryker back to the laboratory to question the staff and nearby villagers about what happened and to confirm Carter's death. Stryker finds Carter and Lotus recuperating in a nearby village. Carter kills Stryker in hand-to-hand combat, steals his uniform and car and drives back to Peking.

Bormann discovers Lotus is the daughter of the AXE informant he had murdered and that she helped Carter break into the Imperial Palace. He goes to her apartment and waits for Carter and Lotus to return. Bormann confronts Carter. Just as he is about to kill him Sim Chan appears. They both shoot each other. Sim Chan is killed and Bormann wounded. Lotus tries to kill Bormann but is shot dead. Bormann escapes into the night badly wounded. Reluctantly, Carter leaves Lotus's body and gives chase.

== Main characters ==
- Nick Carter – posing as Harry Toombs, Canadian journalist
- David Hawk – head of AXE; Carter's boss
- Lotus – daughter of Carter's Peking contact
- Martin Bormann – aka Judas, Carter's foe
- Walter Kerner – German scientist, associate of Bormann
- Sim Chan – Chinese agent and mistress of Walter Kerner
- Captain Gunther Stryker – German soldier, associate of Bormann
- Hans Danzig – German scientist

== The Tulip Affair plot summary ==
Mark Harrison, AXE agent, is murdered in Bangkok by Rudy Carpenter, an Albanian working for communist China. Harrison is replaced by a false agent feeding fake intelligence back to AXE. AXE chief, David Hawk, eventually discovers the truth. Harrison had been set up by an AXE agent known as Tulip. Carter and Tulip are old friends. Hawk sends Carter to Bangkok to investigate and to eliminate Tulip if he is found to be the traitor.

Carter tortures the false agent into revealing the location of Carpenter. Carter breaks into Carpenter's flat and murders him. Carter travels to Hong Kong and breaks into Tulip's flat only to find that he has left in a hurry. He questions Tulip's mistress – May Chin. She refuses to believe Tulip is a traitor but has no idea where he is.

Carter visits Jimmy How an old associate of his and Tulip. Carter threatens to expose How's heroin processing business if he does not reveal Tulip's whereabouts. How informs Carter that Tulip is hiding out on Cheung Chau island and that his men will visit him tonight to bring him supplies. Carter can tag along but only on condition that he kill Tulip so that his business is protected. Carter agrees.

While Jimmy How's man delivers the supplies Carter waits outside. Carter is suspicious as How's man re-emerges. It is Tulip wearing the man's clothes and attempting to flee. Carter challenges him and shoots him dead.

== Main characters ==
- Nick Carter – AXE agent N3
- David Hawk – head of AXE; Carter's boss
- Tulip – aka Harry Weston
- May Chin – Tulip's mistress
- Jimmy How – Hong Kong criminal, associate of Tulip and Carter
- Rudy Carpenter – Albanian criminal based in Bangkok
- Mark Harrison – murdered AXE agent
