= Hood of Death =

1968 novel by William L. Rohde

Hood of Death is the 34th novel in the long-running Nick Carter-Killmaster series of spy novels. Carter is a US secret agent, code-named N-3, with the rank of Killmaster. He works for AXE – a secret arm of the US intelligence services.

== Publishing history ==
The book was first published in 1968 (Number A326X) by Award Books part of the Beacon-Signal division of Universal Publishing and Distributing Corporation (New York, USA), part of the Conde Nast Publications Inc. The novel was written by William L. Rohde. Copyright was registered on 15 March 1968.

== Plot summary ==
The novel is set in July 1968.

Four men – a senator, cabinet official, banker and Washington, D.C. lobbyist – have died suddenly apparently of natural causes. All the men own substantial shares in the same Middle East oil and munitions companies. David Hawk, chief of secret US intelligence agency AXE, is suspicious.

Nick Carter, agent N3, goes undercover as oil executive Jerry Deming. He joins the same high-level social circuit as the dead men offering himself as bait. As he returns home one evening in the company of Ruth Moto he is attacked and his home robbed by a gang of armed men (Hans Geist, Sammy, Chick Soong and an unnamed man).

AXE has identified six Asian women, including Ruth Moto, who have attended a variety of social functions with the dead men. Carter targets the women at his next function - an exclusive party at the secluded Lord estate in Pennsylvania where he poses as Alastair Williams, an executive from Vickers. Carter discovers that the six Asian women are part of a high-class call girl group collaborating with the Baumann Group (possibly led by Carter's arch-enemy, Judas) and Chinese communists.

After a firefight with armed staff at the estate, Carter escapes with one of the girls (Jeanyee Ahling). He tricks her into boarding a private plane and flying back to Washington, D.C. under AXE protection. Carter attempts to interrogate her on the plane but is largely unsuccessful. As Carter feigns sleep Jeanyee places a thin plastic hood over his face that releases a poison gas – the method used to kill the four high-profile victims. Carter holds his breath and Jeanyee removes the mask thinking Carter has died. Carter confronts Jeanyee but she jumps to her death from the plane.

Carter resumes his social activities as Jerry Deming. Eventually, he meets Sonya Ranyez – another of the six call girls. AXE traces a lead to Baltimore. Carter checks out a large Chinese restaurant on the coast, which has its own small marina. Staking it out at night he boards a cruiser taking Sonya and the remaining girls and the gang members out to sea.

The cruiser meets up with a schooner in the Magothy River. A meeting takes place with Hans Geist, Sammy, Chick Soong – apparently a middleman acting for communist China – and a heavily bandaged man who may be Judas/Martin Bormann. It becomes clear that China is seducing / pressuring prominent US business leaders to supply crude oil. If they fail to comply they are murdered using the Hood of Death.

Carter, still posing as Jerry Deming, sets up a meeting with Ruth's father, Akito Moto in search of a job as an oil broker. Akito agrees to meet him. Carter confronts Akito in his office. Akito recognizes Carter as the man who caused disruption at the Lord estate party. Soong bursts in and Carter shoots him and Akito. Geist and Sammy are killed later. Ruth kills herself rather than be arrested.

== Main characters ==
- Nick Carter –agent N-3, AXE (posing as Gerald Parsons Deming; Alastair Beadle Williams)
- David Hawk –head of AXE; Carter's boss
- Ruth Moto – call girl
- Jeanyee Ahling – call girl
- Sonya Ranyez – call girl
- Ulysses Lord – aka John Villon, reclusive estate owner
- Akito Tsogu Nu Moto – posing as Ruth's father
- Chick Soong – Chinese middleman, gang member
- Sammy – gang member
