= Fraulein Spy =

Spy adventure novel by Valerie Moolman

Fraulein Spy is the fifth novel in the long-running Nick Carter-Killmaster series.

Fraulein Spy. Front cover of 1st US paperback edition. Publication date: October 1964

== Publishing history ==
The book was first published in October 1964 (Number A118F) by Award Books part of the Beacon-Signal division of Universal Publishing and Distributing Corporation (New York, USA), part of the Conde Nast Publications Inc. The novel was written by Valerie Moolman. Copyright was registered in the US on 11 October 1964.

== Plot summary ==
The story is set in May 1964. Nick Carter is on the trail of Judas – the master spy first encountered in Run, Spy, Run. Posing as an investigative journalist for a West German tabloid newspaper, Carter tracks Judas to Buenos Aires, Argentina, where he is living among the expatriate German community under the alias Hugo Bronson. Carter meets an informant at his home who reveals that Bronson is actually Martin Bormann, one of Adolf Hitler's closest aides and who was thought to have escaped from Germany at the end of World War II. Before he can reveal Bormann's current whereabouts the informant is shot dead by a sniper. Carter takes documents from the informant's safe that identify two missing German scientists as former Nazis.

Carter traces Bronson to a house in West Berlin where he discovers a plot to kidnap five renowned German scientists living overseas. AXE suspects that the terrorist organization known as CLAW, supported by communist China, is behind an operation to kidnap the scientists and transport them to China. Four of the scientists are missing; the fifth, Dr Mark Gerber – a naturalized American – has been persuaded by his attractive secretary (Elena Darby) to join her on a round-the-world trip. AXE sends two agents to trail Gerber on his trip while Carter meets up with them in Cairo, Egypt. AXE discovers that Gerber's secretary is a communist spy luring Gerber to a location where he can be kidnapped more easily.

On the Bombay to New Delhi leg of the world tour Julia Baron (Carter's assistant in Run, Spy, Run and The China Doll) joins the group. One of the missing scientists is also on the flight against his will accompanied by a minder. The elderly scientist tries to leave the group during a sightseeing trip aided by Carter but dies of heart failure in the attempt. He manages to inform Carter that Bormann was behind the plan to assemble the team of scientists on behalf of China.

En route to the Taj Mahal the plane is hijacked by terrorists posing as passengers and diverted to a military base in China. Gerber is separated from the rest of the passengers and taken to a secret underground laboratory. There he meets Bronson and the team of missing German scientists who are expected to help build an atomic bomb for the Chinese. Carter organizes a revolt by the passengers. They overcome the guards and steal their weapons. Carter and Elena enter the secret laboratory searching for Gerber. They find him and the other missing scientists restrained in a chamber while the military base commandant (Yi) is torturing Julie Baron to force the scientists to cooperate. Carter kills the commandant in unarmed combat and frees the scientists. Elena is caught and tied up. Carter places a time bomb in the missile silo and breaks out with the passengers – several of whom are killed or injured in the attempt. Carter recognizes Bronson as Judas. Judas escapes unharmed as the passengers board their hijacked plane and escape as Carter's bomb explodes destroying the secret base.

== Main characters ==
- Nick Carter (agent N-3, AXE; posing as journalist, Karl Gruber; posing as photographer Philip Carteret)
- Mr Hawk (Carter's boss, head of AXE)
- Judas (alias Hugo Bronson/Martin Bormann)
- Julia Baron (alias AJ Wyatt)
- Dr Mark Gerber (kidnapped American scientist)
- Elena Darby (Gerber's secretary, the female spy of the title)
- Commandant Yi (head of the secret nuclear missile facility in China)
- Prof Lautenbach (former Nazi, chief scientist at the secret nuclear missile facility in China)
