= Operation Moon Rocket =

1968 novel by Lew Louderback

Operation Moon Rocket is the 32nd novel in the long-running Nick Carter-Killmaster series of spy novels. Carter is a US secret agent, code-named N-3, with the rank of Killmaster. He works for AXE – a secret arm of the US intelligence services.

== Publishing history ==
The book was first published in 1968 by Award-Tandem Books (Number A295X [Award / T180 [Tandem]) by Universal Publishing and Distributing Corporation (New York, USA) and Universal-Tandem Publishing Co. Ltd. (London, England). The novel was written by Lew Louderback. Copyright was registered on 13 February 1968.

== Plot summary ==
The novel is set in May 1968.

The Apollo space mission immediately prior to the Moon mission explodes on the launchpad. AXE Chief, David Hawk, suspects sabotage and sends Nick Carter, agent N-3, to investigate. The saboteur is identified as a member of the launchpad crew but he is soon found dead – his murder staged to look like suicide. He was last seen in a high-end nightclub in West Palm Beach with NASA physician and prime suspect, Dr Joy Sun.

Carter and his inexperienced young assistant, Candy Sweet, investigate the nightclub. They discover a sophisticated covert surveillance operation run by The Syndicate – an organized crime gang. They also discover compromising photographs of Dr Sun with Reno Tree – former hitman for the Las Vegas mob and owner of the nightclub.

Hawk informs Carter that NASA is secretly preparing to launch a replacement mission (Phoenix One) in the next few days using the reserve crew. The leader of the reserve crew, Colonel Glenn Eglund, has been seriously injured in an assassination attempt at Manned Spacecraft Center in Houston. Carter is to impersonate Eglund as it is expected that the assassin will strike again knowing that they failed the first time.

Carter, heavily made up to resemble Eglund, resumes training at Houston. He is attacked on the moon surface simulator by an unknown assailant but manages to break his assailant's wrist and escape. AXE discovers that the secret information about the Phoenix One launch has been leaked by someone high up in NASA. As the Phoenix One crew flies from Houston to Cape Canaveral for the launch, Carter confronts Dr Sun with the photograph. She is aware Carter is not Eglund and may be a US government agent. She denies trying to have Carter killed. An explosion causes the plane to decompress at high altitude but the crew manages to land the plane safely. Carter realises that the Apollo program security chief, Major Sollitz, is the saboteur.

Candy Sweet asks for Carter's help searching the swamps at the edge of the Kennedy Space Center. Major Sollitz is forced to crash a remotely controlled helicopter into them and is killed in the process. Carter traces the radio transmitter that controlled the helicopter to a nearby gas station. He discovers two men packing away electronic equipment on to a boat. Carter kills them both. Candy Sweet pulls a gun on Carter. Carter dives over board and escapes.

Carter returns to the nightclub in West Palm Beach posing as conman and gambler, Mickey Elgar, looking for a high-stakes poker game. He discovers Candy Sweet in a relationship with Reno Tree. Carter is beaten and awakens in the Riviera Beach home of Alex Simian – owner of NASA contractor, General Kinetic. He is invited to play cards with Simian and the leaders of The Syndicate. It is clear from the discussions that Simian is greatly in debt to The Syndicate.

Simian needs General Kinetic to displace rival contractor Connelly and secure the US$20 billion Apollo program funding to refloat his holdings. Simian has kidnapped the families of the Apollo program electronic guidance crew and held them captive in the General Kinetic medical center in Miami. The Phoenix One launch has been sabotaged to alter course after lift-off and crash into Miami. Carter and Joy Sun head for the medical center.

Carter leaves Joy Sun to recuperate in a cheap hotel while he surveils the medical center. When he returns he finds Joy Sun missing and Candy Sweet in her place – murdered. Carter is captured, drugged and taken to the medical center. When he regains consciousness there are only 4 minutes to the sabotaged launch of Phoenix One. Simian taunts him via a closed-circuit TV link from his beachfront home. Carter escapes and manages to contact NASA mission controllers to delay the launch for 24 hours. Carter races to Simian's home. He breaks in and confronts Simian who tries to escape by motor launch. Carter kills Reno Tree. Simian loses control of the motor launch and crashes it killing himself.

The next day, Carter relaxes in a Miami hotel watching the launch of Phoenix One in bed with a girlfriend.

== Main characters ==
- Nick Carter – agent N-3, AXE (posing as Sam Harmon – lawyer; Colonel Glenn Eglund – astronaut; Mickey Elgar – conman and gambler)
- David Hawk – head of AXE; Carter's boss
- Dr Joy Han Sun – Medical Research Chief, Project Apollo
- Candace Weatherall Sweet – aka Candy Sweet; AXE agent
- Alex Simian – manager, General Kinetics
- Major Duanne F. Sollitz – security chief for Apollo program
- Rinaldo Tribolati – aka Reno Tree; nightclub owner; member of The Syndicate
- Johnny Hung Fat – associate of Reno Tree and Alex Simian
- Hank Peterson – AXE agent L-32
