= Operation Snake =

1969 novel by Jon Messmann

Operation Snake is the 51st novel in the long-running Nick Carter-Killmaster series of spy novels. Carter is a US secret agent, code-named N-3, with the rank of Killmaster. He works for AXE – a secret arm of the US intelligence services.

== Publishing history ==
The book was first published in December 1969 (Number A559X) by Award Books part of the Beacon-Signal division of Universal Publishing and Distributing Corporation (New York, USA), part of the Conde Nast Publications Inc. The novel was written by Jon Messmann., Copyright was registered on 15 December 1969.

== Plot summary ==
Carter is sent to Nepal on an urgent mission. The King of Nepal is expected to sign a decree allowing increased Chinese immigration into Nepal. AXE fears this will lead to undue influence on Nepal's affairs by communist China. The immigration bill has been promoted by Ghotak, the King's principal advisor, who believes himself to be the inheritor of the spirit of Karkotek, Lord of All Snakes, and an important figure in Nepalese mythology.

Upon arrival in Namche Bazaar Carter is briefed by Harry Angsley of British intelligence who is leaving Nepal due to sudden illness. Carter is followed from his meeting with Angsley by a British journalist, Hilary Cobb, who tries to persuade Carter to let her join him. Carter threatens Cobb and sets off alone to Kathmandu.

In Kathmandu, Carter arrives at the house of Leeunghi – a respected local patriarch and opponent of Khotak. Carter, Leeunghi, and his daughter, Khaleen, plan to disrupt Khotak's next meeting where he intends to incite the audience into a religious frenzy and get them to sign his immigration petition. At the meeting Ghotak reminds the audience of his supernatural mandate; his words and deeds are supported by Karkotek and his foes are destroyed by the Yeti. Leeunghi objects to Ghotak's interpretation and Ghotak responds by challenging Leeunghi to stay overnight in the mountains. If the Yeti does not kill him it is a sign that Ghotak is not telling the truth.

Leeunghi sets off alone into the mountains. When he does not return the next day Carter goes into the mountains to search for him. Carter discovers Leeunghi's body torn limb from limb apparently by some wild animal. Carter challenges Ghotak that he too will spend the night in the mountains to disprove the existence of the Yeti.

As Carter settles in for the night in his camp in the mountains he is disturbed by Hilary Cobb who has followed him. Hilary is attacked by the Yeti and Carter fights it off. Next morning Carter and Hilary discover a company of Chinese soldiers in a remote site awaiting orders from Ghotak. Carter fires his rifle to start an avalanche, which buries the entire company. Carter confronts Ghotak upon his return to Kathmandu.

The next day, Ghotak heads into the mountains for his biweekly meditation. Carter follows but is surprised and captured by Ghotak's henchmen. Ghotak takes Carter to a remote cave where the creature everyone believes to be a Yeti is caged. Ghotak informs Carter that he has raised the creature since it was born 20 years previously. Ghotak allows it out of its cage to feed on animals and humans but it always returns to its cage. Ghotak releases the animal and it chases after Carter. Carter fights it, kills it and drags its body back to Kathmandu.

Carter confronts Ghotak in his temple. Knowing he has lost local support Ghotak flees. As Carter gives chase he falls through a trapdoor into a pit of poisonous snakes. Unable to get out Carter all but gives up until Khaleen jumps into the pit and beats back the snakes. Many of the snakes bite her. Carter escapes carrying Khaleen who dies soon after.

Carter chases Ghotak downriver to a stable. As Carter searches it for Ghotak he steps into a steel animal trap. Ghotak sets fire to bales of hay and attempts to escape. Desperately Carter throws his stiletto and kills Ghotak. Carter pries the trap free and rides back to town.

Carter flies back to England with Hilary Cobb and obtains permission from Hawk for Cobb to file a story on the mission.

== Main characters ==
- Nick Carter – agent N-3, AXE
- David Hawk – head of AXE; Carter's boss
- Hilary Cobb – journalist, Manchester Journal and Record
- Ghotak – advisor to King of Nepal; Head of the Teeoan Temple and Snake Society
- Leeunghi – friend of Nepalese royal family; anti-Ghotak supporter
- Khaleen – Leeunghi's daughter
