= Circle of Scorpions =

1985 novel

Circle of Scorpions is the 196th novel in the long-running Nick Carter-Killmaster series. The book was first published in 1985.

== Plot summary ==
Nick Carter knows that the KGB has called a meeting of all the world's terrorist organizations. It's a party he wants to crash: the only problem is, he doesn't know where or when. But espionage has its own deadly etiquette, and with the help of a beautiful double agent and a black market death-merchant, N3 proves that there are ways to get invited to even the most exclusive affairs...

== Main characters ==
- Nick Carter, agent N-3, AXE
- Hawk, Carter's boss, head of AXE
- Naomi Bartinelli, money launderer and arms broker
- Al Garret, AXE electronics expert
- Ali Maumed Kashmir, Lebanese arms dealer
- Carlotta Polti, Italian CID agent working undercover in the La Aicizia di Liberta Italiana terrorist group.
- Hadley, Chris, Barzoni, Hal, Ted, and Marco, AXE strike team members
- Oakhurst code name for an Amsterdam arms dealer
- Tony Santoni, Italian CID
- Sophia Palmori, Liberta terrorist member
- Wombo, Pocky and Nordo Compari, Liberta terrorist members
- Pietro Amani, jailed leader of Liberta
- Jason Henry, American mercenary pilot
