= The Chinese Paymaster =

1967 novel by Nicholas Browne

The Chinese Paymaster is the 24th novel in the long-running Nick Carter-Killmaster series of spy novels. Carter is a US secret agent, code-named N-3, with the rank of Killmaster. He works for AXE – a secret arm of the US intelligence services.

== Publishing history ==
The book was first published in 1967 (Number A239X) by Award Books part of the Beacon-Signal division of Universal Publishing and Distributing Corporation (New York, USA), part of the Conde Nast Publications Inc. The novel was written by Nicholas Browne. Copyright was registered on 10 July 1967.

== Plot summary ==
The novel is set in the summer of 1966.

The US government is concerned that several of its covert military operations and diplomatic initiatives are being exposed resulting in the deaths of military personnel and allies and compromising foreign policy.

AXE has traced the source of the leaks to a communist Chinese plot to bribe senior government officials. The paymaster's identity is unknown but AXE has discovered that the information and foreign currency required to support his activities are being moved around the world via charter flights operated by a specialist tour company. Carter is ordered to join the next international tour and identify the paymaster.

As Carter boards the flight in New York his cover story is questioned by airline representatives and he is almost killed in a botched assassination attempt. Carter assumes that the Chinese paymaster is on board with him and spends the trip trying to identify him. On board Carter receives a coded message from Hawk that his cover has been blown. He is ordered to meet an MI5 contact in London for an update. At his meeting, Carter learns he is a “festered lily” – a man marked for death by Chinese intelligence. The MI5 agent is killed by a sniper before he can tell Carter anything more.

Focusing on American heiress, Tracy Vanderlake, one of the co-passengers in the tour group, Carter tracks her to a Regent Street casino and then to a pub on the rundown Surrey Docks. There he is again shot at but escapes by jumping into the Grand Surrey Canal. When he returns to the pub he discovers that Tracy has been kidnapped.

The tour continues to Paris. Carter follows Li Valery – a Vietnamese model – to a park where she hands over US15,000 [worth >US$100,000 in 2014] to a Chinese man. Li reveals that the money is a bribe to help reunite her family split between China and North Vietnam. Carter lets her go if she promises not to reveal his identity to the other passengers.

Back at his hotel Carter meets Tracy Vanderlake who managed to escape from her captors in London. During the night Carter is attacked in his room. He kills the assassin and dumps his body in the Seine. Carter drops out of the tour and follows at his own pace to confuse the assassins.

In Rome, Carter follows and kills a courier carrying secret information. The tour group is invited to the villa of the Contessa Fabiana – aunt of the courier Carter killed. Carter is targeted for assassination by the Contessa and her staff but escapes.

The tour continues on to Athens and Cairo without incident. In Kenya, the tour group goes on safari. A lion charges the group and the chief guide shoots and kills Tracy Vanderlake by mistake. Carter interrogates the guide and discovers that he has been paid 5000 GBP to try to kill Carter.

The tour group proceeds to the Republic of Najed on the Persian Gulf. The group visits the palace of Sheik Ibn Ben Auda. While the guests are being entertained Carter searches their bedrooms in an attempt to identify the paymaster. Carter is overwhelmed by the Sheikh's bodyguards and captured.

Carter and Li Valery are forced to drink whisky until they are drunk and are then abandoned in the desert, where their eventual deaths will be attributed to misadventure. The next day, Carter's friend and fellow passenger, Pecos Smith, tracks them down and saves them. Smith is killed by the Sheikh's henchmen but Carter chases the snipers and kills them with Smith's revolver.

In Bangkok, Carter follows tour group member Jack Johnson as he delivers a bag of microfilm to a contact in a brothel. Johnson is killed in a contrived melee and the bag disappears. Carter learns that Johnson was delivering the bag as a favor to another passenger, Frank Baxter. Carter follows Baxter to a Buddhist temple where he delivers another bag to the chief monk. Carter is captured by the monks of the temple and doused in gasoline in preparation for a public immolation. He escapes at the last minute and sets light to the chief monk instead. Back at their hotel, Carter confronts Baxter. Baxter's wife attacks Carter and Baxter accidentally shoots. Carter shoots Baxter but before he dies he whispers the name of the ringleader.

The tour continues to Manila and Tokyo without incident. As the tour group returns to New York, Kirby Fairbanks attempts to hijack the plane and have it flown to Bermuda. The pilot convinces Fairbanks to land in New York. Carter and Fairbanks fight as the plane comes in to land. Fairbanks locks himself in the lavatory and commits suicide. Carter arranges for all the passengers and luggage to be searched but finds nothing. The airline public relations representative, Dan O’Brien, boards the plane in the hangar to collect some smuggled pornographic movies to share with the ground crew. Carter intercepts him – the movies contain the smuggled intelligence collected from communist agents around the world. O’Brien attempts to fly away in a stolen executive jet but crashes. Carter retrieves the film from the wreckage.

== Main characters ==
- Nick Carter – agent N-3, AXE; posing as Nicholas Campbell
- Hawk – head of AXE; Carter's boss,
- Tracy Vanderlake – American heiress
- Li Valery – Vietnamese model
- Pecos Smith – elderly American tourist
- Dan O’Brien – Pan World Airlines public relations representative
- Kirby Fairbanks – American tourist
- Frank Baxter – a.k.a. Captain Smiley, American daytime TV presenter
- Millie Baxter – wife of Frank Baxter
- Jack Johnson – American sports announcer
- Sheik Ibn Ben Auda – head of state, Republic of Najed
- Contessa Fabiana – Italian noblewoman
