= Operation Starvation (novel) =

1966 novel by Nicholas Browne

Operation Starvation is the 17th novel in the long-running Nick Carter-Killmaster series of spy novels. Carter is a US secret agent, code-name N-3, with the rank of Killmaster. He works for AXE, a secret arm of the US intelligence services.

== Publishing history ==
The book was first published in 1966 (Number A197F) by Award Books part of the Beacon-Signal division of Universal Publishing and Distributing Corporation (New York, USA), part of the Conde Nast Publications Inc. The novel was written by Nicholas Browne. Copyright was registered on 1 March 1966.

== Plot ==
The novel is set in Spring 1966 (late March – early April). Nick Carter is in Paris when he is attacked by four Asian assailants. Meanwhile, a Dutch Boeing 707 from Paris to New York City is hijacked by Asian terrorists. One of the passengers, renowned Chinese microbiologist Dr Lin Chang-su, is kidnapped and forced to return to China; the other 150 passengers are killed and the plane destroyed to make it look like a mid-air explosion.

Dr Lin has discovered a spore that kills a fungal pathogen of the rice plant, potentially leading to a cure for global hunger. He has also discovered the antidote to the spore – an invention that could condemn millions to death by starvation. Dr. Lin refuses to continue to work on the spore until his daughter, Kathy Lin, who accompanied him to Paris, is returned to him alive and well. Agents of the People's Republic of China are frantically searching Europe for her. Nick Carter is ordered to find her first.

Carter joins CIA agent Rusty Donovan at a Paris nightclub where he encounters Johnny Wu-tsang and Dominique St. Martin – known associates of Kathy Lin. Carter recruits Dominique as an aide in getting to Kathy first. Dominique arranges to meet her in Les Halles marketplace in Paris. Johnny Wu – a communist Chinese spymaster - and his men are also there waiting to intercept Kathy. Dominique meets her and secretly tags her with a radioactive tracer. She attempts to flee. Carter tracks her with a Geiger counter as Johnny Wu and his men also give chase. Carter intercepts Kathy and takes her back to her hotel. Carter reveals that Kathy's father has been captured and returned to China. Kathy has given her signet ring to Dominique for safekeeping. The ring is to signal to her father that the bearer can be trusted if she cannot herself return to meet him.

Dominique is kidnapped by Johnny Wu and interrogated at his chateau by Arthur – Wu's sadistic henchman. Carter attempts to free Dominique and retrieve the ring but is also captured and tortured by Arthur. Wu reveals that Rusty Donovan was unable to stop Kathy from being captured. Carter escapes, kills Arthur, and retrieves the ring from Dominique. Before she dies from the effects of Arthur's torture, Dominique tells Carter that Wu has taken Kathy to his chateau in Biarritz. Before he can pursue Johnny Wu, Hawk orders Carter to China to extract Dr Lin from custody.

Carter parachutes into the Taklamakan Desert and meets up with a group of mercenary Afghan Khuf tribesmen led by Changra Lal. Packages containing the parts for a mini-helicopter have been dropped into the camp ahead of Carter's arrival. Carter assembles the two-seat helicopter and flies into the secret agricultural station where Dr Lin is working. Carter rescues Lin and returns to the Khuf camp.

A few days later, Carter returns to Biarritz with Rusty Donovan to rescue Kathy. Together, Carter and Donovan launch an assault on the heavily armed villa. Donovan is killed and an enraged Carter savagely clears the house room by room. Johnny Wu escapes with Kathy to a nearby dock and attempts to launch his yacht in an approaching storm.

Carter dives off the pier and intercepts the yacht as it struggles to leave port. Carter fights hand to hand with Johnny Wu and they both fall into the sea. Exhausted from fighting Carter struggles back to the yacht and allows Wu to drown. He sails to a Basque port and has sex with Kathy.

== Main characters ==
- Nick Carter - agent N-3, AXE; posing as lawyer Sam Harmon
- Mr Hawk - Carter's boss, head of AXE
- Dominique St. Martin - French journalist (Carter's ally)
- Rusty Donovan - CIA agent (Carter's ally)
- Dr Lin Chang-su - Chinese scientist
- Kathy Lin - Dr Lin's daughter
- Johnny Wu-tsung - Chinese agent (Carter's foe)
- Arthur - Chinese assistant to Johnny Wu (Carter's foe)
- Changra Lal – Afghan leader of Khuf tribesmen (Carter's ally)
