= Seven Against Greece =

1967 novel by Nicholas Browne

Seven Against Greece is the 25th novel in the long-running Nick Carter-Killmaster series of spy novels. Carter is a US secret agent, code-named N-3, with the rank of Killmaster. He works for AXE – a secret arm of the US intelligence services.

== Publishing history ==
The book was first published in 1967 (Number A247X) by Award Books part of the Beacon-Signal division of Universal Publishing and Distributing Corporation (New York, USA), part of the Conde Nast Publications Inc. The novel was written by Nicholas Browne. Copyright was registered on 14 August 1967.

== Plot summary ==
The novel is set in August 1966.

An AXE agent is murdered while investigating a Greek tourist agency, Golden Islands Promotions, which has been responsible for sponsoring large numbers of US visa applications. AXE chief, David Hawk, sends Nick Carter to Greece to investigate further.

Posing as archaeologist, Prof Andrew Harding, Carter establishes contact with Golden Islands Promotion. Then posing as a merchant seaman, Thomas Evans, Carter contacts Leonidas, an old World War II Greek resistance fighter. Carter learns that Golden Islands Promotions has a training camp on the island of Baos in the Cyclades. Carter is followed and attacked by members of the Sons of Prometheus – a secret terrorist organization – who think “Evans” is spying on them.

Carter (as Prof. Harding) attends a function organized by Golden Islands Promotions where American guests are introduced to young men and women seeking sponsors for their visa applications to the US. Carter discovers that many of the candidates have close relatives in communist countries. As part of their training, the candidates are compelled to take various technical courses. Carter suspects that they are unwittingly being taught the tradecraft of espionage and will be coerced into spying against the US later by threats made against their families. Carter meets Princess Electra – girlfriend of Papadorus – the billionaire owner of Golden Islands Promotions. She suspects Carter is investigating the activities of Golden Islands and sends thugs to murder him at his hotel. Carter kills the thugs and makes his way to the training camp on Baos assisted by Leonidas.

With Leonidas, Carter confirms the camp has been established to train spies and discovers a large cache of weapons and military vehicles. Carter and Leonidas destroy the camp, the arms depots and the island's dock. Carter and Leonidas are hunted down and trapped in mountain caves. Leonidas is killed and Carter is captured. He is interrogated by Ian McAffery – a British mercenary – hired by Papadorus. McAffery is ordered to bring Carter by seaplane to Papadorus' yacht sailing in the Aegean. Carter kills McAffery whilst in flight using Pierre his poison gas pellet and assumes McAffery's identity.

Carter (disguised as McAffery) attends a meeting with Papadorus, General Lin and Gorgas. Papadorus' shipping line is bankrupt and is currently bankrolled by the Chinese government as an efficient means of moving Chinese spies around the world. Gorgas and the Sons of Prometheus are also bankrolled by the Chinese and are planning a coup d'etat to topple the Greek government. Despite losing much of their arms and supplies in the Baos raid Gorgas demands to launch his coup in the morning – starting with the destruction of the Parthenon. Gorgas leaves the meeting. Papadorus and General Lin grow weary of Gorgas' demands and intend to have him assassinated. Carter is unmasked as an AXE agent when General Lin exposes Carter's distinctive tattoo.

Held captive in a cellar, Carter overhears how Papadorus and Princess Electra will escape from Lin's hold over them. They will kidnap rich patrons attending a play given by the Golden Islands Promotions recruits imprison them on Papadorus' yacht and ransom them off to their families to obtain enough funds to live comfortably in South America. Carter is taken to a nearby Temple of Poseidon on the coast where he is tied to a pole in a rock pool to be drowned when the tide comes in. As he waits he is attacked by a giant octopus. Carter kills the octopus by biting its head. He escapes and makes his way to the Theater of Sophocles – an ancient amphitheatre carved into the hillside outside Athens where the play is to be performed. Posing as a member of the Greek chorus, Carter foils the kidnap attempt and chases Princess Electra into the nearby countryside. He kills her and her body falls off the cliff into the sea.

Carter and Shorty (an ally from Interpol) go to the docks in Piraeus and find Papadorus' yacht almost ready to sail. Shorty watches the ship while Carter goes to the Parthenon – expecting Gorgas to keep his promise to blow it up. Gorgas has rigged the Parthenon with plastic explosive and has tied Carter's girlfriend, Xenia, to one of the temple’s columns. Carter kills Gorgas and rescues Xenia.

Papadorus and General Lin do not wait for Princess Electra to return with the hostages and set sail for Albania. Carter, Shorty, Xenia and a US sailor give chase in an experimental US navy hydrofoil. They are fired upon and Shorty is killed. Carter destroys the yacht with depth charge. There are no survivors from the yacht. Carter returns to Piraeus and goes on a sailing vacation with Xenia.

== Main characters ==
- Nick Carter – agent N-3, AXE; posing as Prof Andrew Harding, archaeologist; Thomas ‘Pedro’ Evans, merchant seaman
- David Hawk – head of AXE; Carter’s boss,
- Leonidas – former Greek resistance fighter, Carter’s ally
- Xenia Mitropoleos – Greek prostitute, Carter’s ally
- Alexos Petrides – aka Shorty; Interpol agent; Carter’s ally
- Princess Electra – girlfriend of Papadorus
- Papadorus –shipping magnate; boyfriend of Princess Electra
- Gorgas – aka Prometheus; aka Black Monk of Cyprus; Greek terrorist, head of the “Sons of Prometheus”
- Lin Te-peng – General, People’s Liberation Army; Chinese spymaster
- Ian McAffery – captain, Royal Dublin Fusiliers; mercenary employed by Papadorus
