= The Code (novel) =

1973 novel by Larry Powell

The Code is the 77th novel in the Nick Carter-Killmaster series of spy novels., Carter is a US secret agent, code-named N-3, with the rank of Killmaster. He works for AXE – a secret arm of the US intelligence services.

== Publishing history ==
The book was first published in 1973 by Award-Tandem Books (Number AN1146) by Universal Publishing and Distributing Corporation (New York, USA) and Universal-Tandem Publishing Co. Ltd. (London, England). The novel was written by Larry Powell. Copyright was registered on 15 July 1973.

== Plot summary ==
The story is set in late spring/summer 1973.

Carter's AXE colleague is murdered whilst meeting a retired Mafia boss, Frank Abruze. A $200,000 Mafia payment (over $1,000,000 in 2015) to Abruze is missing. Abruze's mistress, Sheila Brant, escapes unharmed and goes into hiding. Carter is assigned to uncover the killers. Posing as a truck driver, Carter starts by contacting Abruze's mistress who has been traced to a small town in Idaho. Carter's cover is blown before he arrives but he manages to contact Sheila successfully.

Sheila is also tracked down by her former boyfriend, Moose – the man who actually killed Abruze and the AXE agent. Moose gave the stolen $200,000 to Sheila to hide while the heat died down. Moose captures Sheila and Carter. Moose expects Sheila to have the $200,000 on her and is angered when she claims she has not. Moose beats Sheila to death. Carter is shot and is left to bleed to death. Abruze's best friend, Mafia hitman Marco Valante, is also hot on the trail of his killers. He arrives in time to bandage Carter's wounds and leaves to continue his search.

Carter finds Moose's address book on the floor of Sheila's apartment. It contains the names of seven of Moose's girlfriends. Carter uses it to try to find Moose. Along the way, Carter is trailed by Mafia hitmen working for Marco Valante hoping he will lead them to Moose. A second shadowy group is also following Carter and they have made repeated attempts to kill him. Carter suspects a senior Mafia figure set up Abruze for assassination after he vetoed plans for the Mafia to work with Chinese communists to expand their drug smuggling operations.

Carter is captured when he visits one of the girls in Moose's book without knowing she is Marco Valante's daughter. She drugs Carter and calls her father. Marco Valante arrives accompanied by the local Mafia boss, Lew Rossi. Rossi set up Abruze for assassination when Abruze discovered that Rossi was working with Chinese communists to infiltrate AXE. Rossi kills Valante and intends to kill Carter and Valante's daughter to cover up his operation. Barbara Valante fights with Rossi and frees Carter. Rossi flees the apartment and Carter and Barbara chase after him. They follow him to his mansion where Barbara kills him.

Carter tracks down Cora, the last name in Moose's book, to a brothel near Las Vegas. The brothel madam remembers Cora fondly. She shows Carter a picture of her. It is Sheila Brant. Carter tells the madam that Moose killed Sheila. The madam agrees to set up Moose so Carter can kill him. They arrange to meet Moose at a ghost town outside Las Vegas. Carter realises that it was the brothel madam who stole the $200,000 and that Sheila fled from Moose when she found out it had been stolen from her. Carter tells Moose and he kills the madam. Carter kills Moose.

AXE closes down its Carolina and Denver offices to eliminate the Mafia spies. Carter relaxes with Barbara Valante before his next mission.

== Main characters ==
- Nick Carter – agent N-3, AXE (posing as Ned Harper)
- David Hawk – AXE Chief, Carter's boss
- Sheila Brant – Frank Abruze's mistress
- Moose – aka Edward Jones; Mafia hitman
- Marco Valante – Mafia hitman
- Barbara Valante – Marco Valante's daughter
- Lew Rossi – Mafia boss in Denver
