= Agent Counter-Agent =

1973 novel by Ralph Eugene Hayes

Agent Counter-Agent is the 78th novel in the Nick Carter-Killmaster series of spy novels., Carter is a US secret agent, code-named N-3, with the rank of Killmaster. He works for AXE – a secret arm of the US intelligence services.

== Publishing history ==
The book was first published in 1973 by Award-Tandem Books (Number AN1147) by Universal Publishing and Distributing Corporation (New York, USA) and Universal-Tandem Publishing Co. Ltd. (London, England). The novel was written by Ralph Eugene Hayes., Copyright was registered on 15 July 1973.

== Plot summary ==
The story is set in April, presumably in 1973.

A threat is made to assassinate the Vice President of the United States and the President of Venezuela at an upcoming forum in Caracas. Carter is sent to investigate. Posing as US embassy staff, Carter observes the security arrangements for the conference. He meets Ilse Hoffmann from the West German embassy in Caracas. Hoffmann is really a Russian scientist, Dr Tanya Savitch, working with the KGB who drugs and captures Carter. Carter is taken to a secret KGB laboratory in Caracas run by Oleg Dimitrov. There Carter is subjected to drug-induced mind control experiments by Savitch and her boss, Dr Anton Kalinin.

Carter is brainwashed into believing he is Rafael Chavez, a Venezuelan revolutionary, whose mission is to assassinate the President of Venezuela and the Vice President of the United States during the conference. However, when Carter is released and goes about his normal duties before the conference he has troubling flashbacks of his real identity. His odd behavior arouses the suspicions of David Hawk and Clay Vincent, a fellow AXE agent. Carter stabs Vincent and ties up Hawk so that he can complete his mission.

Carter is handed a water jug containing a concealed high-frequency transmitter that is capable of destroying central nervous tissue and places it in the conference room. The device will be remotely activated by another confederate.

The low frequency roar of overhead jets brings Carter to his senses. He remembers who he is and what he has done. He forces his way into the conference room. The ultrasonic transmitter activates but causes only minor injuries before Carter destroys it.

Carter searches Caracas for Tanya Savitch. He finds her and forces her to take him back to the secret KGB laboratory. The laboratory is being dismantled. Carter kills a technician and Kalinin. Tanya Savitch wounds Carter and he shoots and kills her. Oleg Dimitrov escapes and heads to the airport. Carter chases him and kills him in the airport washroom.

== Main characters ==
- Nick Carter – agent N-3, AXE (posing as Scott Matthews – US embassy staff)
- David Hawk – AXE Chief, Carter’s boss
- Dr Tanya Savitch – Russian scientist, posing as Ilse Hoffmann (West German embassy staff)
- Dr Anton Kalinin – Russian scientist
- Oleg Dimitrov – KGB agent, Caracas
- Clay Vincent – AXE agent, N7
