= Assault on England =

1972 novel by Ralph Eugene Hayes

First edition

Assault on England is the 67th novel in the long-running Nick Carter-Killmaster series of spy novels. Carter is a US secret agent, code-named N-3, with the rank of Killmaster. He works for AXE – a secret arm of the US intelligence services.

== Publishing history ==
The book was first published in October 1972 by Award-Tandem Books (Number AS1030) by Universal Publishing and Distributing Corporation (New York, USA) and Universal-Tandem Publishing Co. Ltd. (London, England). The novel was written by Ralph Eugene Hayes.

== Plot summary ==
The story is set in autumn of an unspecified year (possibly 1971).

The British Chancellor of the Exchequer and Defence Minister are assassinated. The British Government receives a demand for GBP 12 million to stop the killings. Carter is assigned to assist in the investigation. He is contacted by Augie Fergus – an antiques smuggler in Egypt – who claims to have information about the assassinations. Fergus is killed before he can pass on the information. Carter contacts Hadiya, Fergus's stepdaughter in Tunisia, who has been authorized to pass on the information in the event of Fergus' death. The information comprises a photograph of Fergus's British Army commando unit in Cairo, 1942.

British intelligence identifies the men in the photograph. The only person of significance is Lieutenant John Elmore who became a renowned underworld assassin after the war before being killed in a shootout with police several years previously – although his body was never found.

Instead, British intelligence links the assassinations to a Russian agent, Boris Novosty, who is currently in the UK. Carter is briefed by the head of Special Operations Executive (SOE) and is assigned a young female agent (Heather York) to assist him. Carter and York are sent to Penzance, Cornwall the location of Novosty’s last known sighting. They trace Novosty to a farmhouse near Land's End. Novosty escapes after a gunfight but leaves evidence behind that leads to a cottage in Lower Slaughter in the Cotswolds.

Carter and York lie in wait for Novosty and his agents inside his cottage. Under interrogation, the Russians reveal that they know nothing of the assassinations. They are trying to steal Ministry of Defence missile blueprints.

Returning to London, Carter and York are assigned to protect other senior Cabinet officials. The Foreign Secretary is murdered in his office and Carter almost catches the killer. A note on the body demands GBP 14 million to be sent to Geneva by private plane. The Government prepares to pay the demand. A clue left in the Foreign Secretary's office leads to Jupiter Motors a failing car factory in London. The boss, Elmo Jupiter, is discovered to be Lieutenant John Elmore.

Carter and York are captured by Jupiter's henchmen and driven to a large estate near Beaconsfield where they are imprisoned. Jupiter informs them that his ransom has not been paid and that he will kill the Prime Minister in revenge. Carter and York escape and return to London.

Carter and York search the rooms where a high-level ministerial meeting will be held expecting Jupiter to infiltrate and assassinate the Prime Minister. Carter spots suspicious activity on the rooftop of a building opposite and goes to investigate. Jupiter is preparing to launch a rocket attack on the meeting. Carter distracts him and Jupiter escapes by helicopter. Carter and York follow in a police helicopter. The chase ends at Stonehenge. Carter is about to be shot by Jupiter when York distracts him; Carter kills Jupiter with his stiletto.

== Main characters ==
- Nick Carter – agent N-3, AXE (posing as Richard Matthews)
- Heather York – British SOE agent
- Elmo Jupiter – owner of car factory; a.k.a. Lieutenant John Elmore, ex-British Army
- Boris Novosty – a.k.a. John Ryder
- Augie Fergus – ex-British Army antiques smuggler
- Hadiya – Fergus's stepdaughter
