= Zimbabwe (disambiguation) =

Zimbabwe is a country in southern Africa.

Zimbabwe may also refer to:

- "Zimbabwe" (song), by Bob Marley & The Wailers
- Kingdom of Zimbabwe, a pre-colonial state in modern-day Zimbabwe
- Great Zimbabwe, former capital of the Kingdom of Zimbabwe and archeological site in Southern Africa
- Zimbabwe craton, Early Archaean lithology in southern Africa
- Zimbabwe (Dispatch album)
- Zimbabwe (Assagai album)
