= Rhodesia (novel) =

1968 novel by William L. Rohde

Rhodesia is the 40th novel in the long-running Nick Carter-Killmaster series of spy novels. Carter is a US secret agent, code-named N-3, with the rank of Killmaster. He works for AXE – a secret arm of the US intelligence services.

== Publishing history ==
The book was first published in 1968 by Award-Tandem Books (Number A409X) by Universal Publishing and Distributing Corporation (New York, USA) and Universal-Tandem Publishing Co. Ltd. (London, England). The novel was written by William L. Rohde., Copyright was registered on 7 November 1968.

== Plot summary ==
AXE sends Carter to investigate Rhodesian sanction-busting exports of gold to China and an organization of assassins possibly led by Carter's arch-enemy, Judas (Martin Bormann). Carter goes undercover as tour guide Andrew Grant, taking a dozen female college students on a 30-day tour of Rhodesia. The tour is led by Gus Boyd. At the airport prior to departure Carter sees a man surreptitiously give tour group member, Booty Delong, a small package.

Upon arrival in Rhodesia, Carter and Boyd approach shady businessman Alan Wilson to discuss setting up a gold smuggling operation between Rhodesia and India in the hope it will draw out Judas' smuggling contacts. Wilson has no need for new contacts and warns Carter to stay away from THB (Taylor Hill-Boreman), a Rhodesian gold mining company, which Carter suggested he might contact. Wilson secretly photographs Carter and sends the pictures to Mike Bor (Martin Bormann) chairman of THB who recognizes Carter as his old enemy.

Carter follows Booty DeLong when she refuses to join the tour for the day. She heads to a farm in the Rhodesian countryside where she meets up again with the man at the airport. Carter observes her return the package to him. The package contains cash to support rebels fighting the Rhodesian army. The farm owner, Pieter van Prez, intends to detain Carter overnight. Carter releases a canister of knockout gas and escapes.

Carter visits the Rhodesia Railways office in Salisbury posing as a railway journalist. He probes about freight movements to and from the THB mine. He is followed from the railway office by Stash Foster, an assassin sent by Judas. Carter kills Stash in a vicious knife fight.

Carter flies to Wankie National Park and rejoins the tour group. On an afternoon safari his bus is attacked by Judas's men posing as park workers. After a prolonged chase across the park, Carter and the tour group meet Ross – a rebel leader.

Carter and Ross team up to devise a strategy to enter the vast THB mining enclosure and gather evidence. Carter sets out alone. When Ross returns to their base camp to escort the female tourists back to the main camp he finds they have been captured by THB scouts.

Carter readily discovers the extent of the gold smuggling activities of THB. He manages to get a message to his contact at the railway company to inform the Rhodesian police. Carter targets Judas at a villa inside the THB compound. The captured female tourists are also held there. Carter crashes a truck into the heavily defended villa. In the confusion Judas escapes. Ross and the Rhodesian police arrive in support. Carter sticks to his cover story and allows the police to take credit for the exposure of THB's illegal activities.

Carter completes the rest of the tour in the company of the young women.

== Main characters ==
- Nick Carter – agent N-3, AXE (posing as Andrew Grant, tour guide)
- David Hawk – head of AXE; Carter's boss
- Booty Delong – American heiress; rebel sympathizer; tourist
- Ross – rebel leader
- Mike Bor – chairman of Taylor Hill-Boreman mining company (aka Martin Bormann /Judas)
- John H Johnson – Malcolm X supporter; rebel sympathizer
- Alan Wilson – Rhodesian businessman and gold smuggler
- Martha Ryerson – AXE agent, P21, stationed in Rhodesia
- Stash Foster – Judas's henchman
