= Saigon (Killmaster novel) =

1964 novel by Michael Avallone and Valerie Moolman

First edition

Saigon is the sixth novel in the long-running Nick Carter-Killmaster series of spy novels. Carter is a US secret agent, code-named N-3, with the rank of Killmaster. He works for AXE – a secret arm of the US intelligence services.

== Publishing history ==
The book was first published in December 1964 (Number A122F) by Award Books part of the Beacon-Signal division of Universal Publishing and Distributing Corporation (New York, USA), part of the Conde Nast Publications Inc. The novel was written by Michael Avallone and Valerie Moolman. Copyright was registered in the US.

== Plot summary ==
The story is set in August–September 1964. Claire La Farge, widow of a French intelligence officer, lives in a large rice and tea plantation in North Vietnam. One night she receives a coded message in the form of a knotted belt (quipu) from a former associate of her husband. She sends her trusted servant, Saito, to Saigon to place an advert in the personal column of the Times of Vietnam hoping to contact former colleagues of her husband who can decode the message. Raoul Dupre, a former French intelligence officer and businessman in Saigon, reads the ad and makes contact. Agent Nick Carter, in Saigon posing as a WHO medical observer, answers the ad on a hunch and learns of Dupre's involvement. Dupre's daughter, Antoinette (Toni), has become a heroin addict under the influence of Lin Tong – a Chinese communist spy interested in finding out the truth about her father.

Hawk orders Carter to help Raoul Dupre contact Claire La Farge to retrieve the coded message. Antoinette tells Carter that Lin Tong is pressing her to spy on her father and that she has revealed to Lin Tong what she has overheard of the coded message and the American agent who would be coming to help. Lin Tong follows Antoinette and Carter to a secluded rendezvous where he accidentally shoots and kills her. Carter and Lin Tong race each other to North Vietnam. Carter heads for the La Farge plantation accompanied by Saito while Lin Tong contacts his communist guerilla allies to be on the lookout for a western agent.

Lin Tong arrives at the La Farge plantation first with a small group of North Vietnamese soldiers. He starts to interrogate and torture Claire La Farge concerning the location of the coded message. Carter and Saito arrive shortly afterwards. They assemble the plantation workers still loyal to Claire La Farge and overpower the North Vietnamese soldiers. Lin Tong is captured and Claire La Farge is released. Raoul Dupre arrives by helicopter to take Carter and Lin Tong back to Saigon. The quipu belt is decoded as a list of Chinese communist spies living and working in South Vietnam. Raoul Dupre takes charge of eliminating the spies, while Carter returns home.

== Main characters ==
- Nick Carter (agent N-3, AXE; posing as WHO medical observer)
- Mr Hawk (Carter’s boss, head of AXE)
- Claire La Farge (widowed French rice / tea plantation owner)
- Saito (Japanese servant of Claire La Farge)
- Raoul Dupre (businessman and former French intelligence officer, father of Antoinette)
- Antoinette (Toni) Dupre (daughter of Raoul)
- Lin Tong (Chinese communist spy, lover of Antoinette)
- Ho Van Minh (N. Vietnamese general)
