= Hanoi (novel) =

1966 novel by Valerie Moolman

- Author: Valerie Moolman
- Language: English
- Publication date: 1966

Hanoi is a spy novel by American writer Valerie Moolman, first published in 1966 (Number A182F) by Award Books part of the Beacon-Signal division of Universal Publishing and Distributing Corporation (New York, USA), part of the Conde Nast Publications Inc. Copyright was registered on 1 February 1966. It is the 15th novel in the Nick Carter-Killmaster series.

== Plot summary ==
Officers of the US Special Forces discover a secret camp in North Vietnam near Hanoi. The camp is guarded by Chinese soldiers and houses a group of German scientists, led by Ulric Krutch, who are working on a top secret rocket programme.

A new rocket has been perfected that can deliver a payload into earth orbit. The team of scientists is waiting for Dr Erich Burgdorf to arrive from Buenos Aires with plans for a triggering device that will release a secondary component carrying a secret payload after the rocket has reached orbit.

When it is discovered that none of the scientists has ever met Burgdorf, secret agent Nick Carter is sent to impersonate Burgdorf, infiltrate the camp and neutralize the rocket programme.

Carter parachutes into North Vietnam and enters Hanoi disguised as a peasant on his way to market. There he impersonates Anton Zavodna – a locally known Czechoslovak diplomat and spy. As Zavodna, Carter keeps watch at the airport and observes Burgdorf arriving on a Chinese cargo flight disguised as a crew member. Carter intercepts Burgdorf and convinces him that the expected arrangements have been altered at the last minute and that Carter will help him deliver the plans. Burgdorf accompanies Carter and is promptly captured and transported to Saigon for interrogation by AXE agents. Carter quickly learns about triggering devices from AXE specialists and returns to the camp posing as Burgdorf.

Carter learns that the secondary capsule contains an array of small steel balls containing Metaplast - a type of radioactive explosive that will be jettisoned to create an orbiting minefield. The group's first target is Petrovsk I - a Russian space mission - scheduled to launch in the next few days. In this way, Krutch intends to blackmail Russia and America by jeopardizing the safety of all future space missions unless his demands are met.

Krutch and scientists Wulff and Wiesner do not entirely trust Burgdorf and keep him under close surveillance. Ilse Benz (Wiesner's step-daughter) and Lin Suy are used to try to trap Carter into revealing himself as an imposter.

As the rocket assembly nears completion Carter tries to sabotage the launch. He sends a coded message to the Green Berets to attack the base. Carter kills all the off duty guards in their barracks by gassing them with Pierre – the poison gas bomb. Then he dupes many of the remaining guards into accepting exploding cigars primed to explode within 90 seconds. With a 10,000-watt laser pistol (smuggled into the camp disguised as one half of a pair of binoculars) Carter breaks into the ammunition store and plants bombs. However, Carter is unable to damage the missile itself or the Metaplast which is held in an armored vault prior to loading into the rocket. Instead he single-handedly destroys the rocket command center. The Green Berets arrive to destroy the rocket and the Metaplast. Wiesner, Ilse Benz and Lin Suy are captured and taken to the US for debriefing.

After the mission is complete Carter has sex with Ilse Benz in his New York City apartment.

== Main characters ==
- Nick Carter (agent N-3, AXE; posing as Tran Van Duong – Vietnamese peasant, Anton Zavodna – Czechoslovak diplomat and spy, Dr Erich Burgdorf – German scientist)
- Mr Hawk (Carter’s boss, head of AXE)
- Sergeant Ben Taggart (Intelligence Officer, Special Forces Detachment Q-40
- Dr Erich Burgdorf (German scientist)
- Mr Ulric Krutch (group leader)
- Dr Ilse Benz (German scientist, step-daughter of Karl Wiesner)
- Dr Karl Wiesner (German scientist, step-father of Ilse Benz)
- Dr Helmut Wulff (German scientist)
- Ah Choy (assistant to Krutch, Chinese intelligence officer)
- Lin Suy (female assistant to Krutch and Ah Choy)
- Liu Chan (Chinese embassy staff in Hanoi)
