= The 13th Spy =

1965 novel by Valerie Moolman

- Author: Valerie Moolman
- Language: English
- Series: Nick Carter-Killmaster
- Genre: Spy fiction
- Publisher: Award Books
- Publication date: May 1965
- Publication place: United States

The 13th Spy is the eighth novel in the Killmaster series.

Nick Carter is a fictional character appearing in a series of over 250 spy adventures published from 1964 to the 1990s. Carter is a special agent working in AXE - an ultrasecret arm of the US intelligence services. He is the most deadly agent in AXE and holds the rank of Killmaster.

== Publishing history ==
The book was first published in May 1965 (Number A139F) by Award Books part of the Beacon-Signal division of Universal Publishing and Distributing Corporation (New York, USA), part of the Conde Nast Publications Inc. The novel was written by Valerie Moolman. Copyright was registered in the US.

== Plot summary ==
The story takes place in summer 1965. A missing American CIA agent is drugged and crashes his car into the GUM shop in Red Square, Moscow. He is carrying verbatim transcripts of top secret meetings held in Russian and Chinese Government offices and embassies around the world. The Russians accuse the US of stealing official secrets and passing them to the Chinese to destabilize USSR-China relations. The Russians agree to let AXE investigate the security leak in Moscow.

Secret agent Nick Carter posing as a US government electronics expert, Tom Slade, is sent to investigate. Knowing that Russian agents will be shadowing Slade at all times, Carter arranges to switch identity with another AXE agent already in Moscow who is undercover posing as a Russian literature student, Ivan Kokoschka. Disguised as Kokoschka, Carter stakes out the headquarters of the Russian intelligence service trying to work out how it had been bugged. He notes that the building is under constant surveillance by men parked outside the building. He follows them to a Chinese antiques shop.

Carter is captured and tortured in the basement under the shop by members of the Brothers Twelve – a Chinese spy ring operating in Moscow. Carter is drugged, given a dossier of confidential information, and released close to the US Embassy in Moscow. The Russian secret police are tipped off, apparently by Chinese embassy staff, that a US spy is on his way to the US Embassy for protection and that they should act quickly if they want to catch him and recover the secret documents in his possession.

The Russians capture Carter and interrogate him discovering that he is Slade/Kokoschka. Carter is informed that the Chinese antique shop and basement have been searched without finding anything suspicious. Carter and Dimitri Smirnov (chief commissar of Russian intelligence) search the meeting room of the Russian intelligence services and discover that a recently renovated painting has had a miniaturized microphone and transmitter embedded into it. Carter and Smirnov discover that other renovated fittings have been tampered with and trace suspects to a warehouse in Moscow.

Carter and Valentina Sichikova (chief assistant commissar of Russian intelligence) follow the suspects to the warehouse. Carter finds the remaining members of the Brothers Twelve packing their secret documents and tapes and preparing to depart. Chou Tso-Lin, leader of the Brothers Twelve, escapes after rigging the warehouse to explode with Sichikova still inside. During a car chase through the outskirts of Moscow Carter forces Chou's car off the road and into the Moscow River. Carter returns to the burnt-out warehouse to find that Valentina has survived the explosion.

== Main characters ==
- Nick Carter (agent N-3, AXE; posing as Tom Slade and Ivan Alexandrovitch Kokoschka)
- Mr Hawk (Carter's boss, head of AXE)
- Dimitri Borisovich Smirnov (chief commissar of Russian intelligence)
- Valentina Sichikova (chief assistant commissar of Russian intelligence)
- Chou Tso-Lin (leader of the Brothers Twelve; Embassy Security Officer at the Chinese embassy in Moscow)
- Sonya Dubinsky (student ballerina, the real Kokoschka's girlfriend)
