= Safari for Spies =

1964 novel by Valerie Moolman

First edition

Safari for Spies is the fourth novel in the long-running Nick Carter-Killmaster series.

== Publishing history ==
The book was first published in August 1964 (Number A114F) by Award Books part of the Beacon-Signal division of Universal Publishing and Distributing Corporation (New York, USA), part of the Conde Nast Publications Inc. The novel was written by Valerie Moolman. Copyright was registered in the US on 25 August 1964.

== Plot summary ==
The story takes place in March 1964. The newly independent west African country of the Republic of Nyanga is on the verge of civil war. The country is closely allied to the USSR. The USSR embassy in Nyanga has been bombed and its foreign nationals are being harassed on the streets. The USSR blames the United States for orchestrating the bombing and harassment despite the fact that the US embassy itself has been bombed. Nick Carter is sent to Nyanga posing as a special US ambassador to investigate the true source of the destabilization efforts against Nyanga and its allies. Carter gets to work with the assistance of Liz Ashton, Second Secretary at the US Embassy. Immediately upon arrival he is shadowed by the mysterious Laszlo. The destabilization efforts continue as Julian Makombe, the President of Nyanga, is shot and badly wounded. The chief of police immediately makes a series of arrests and discovers that some of the suspects are drug addicts from Dakar, in neighboring Senegal. Carter travels to Dakar and investigates the Hop Club a sleazy nightclub that supplies heroin and discovers it is a front for Chinese agents. At the recommendation of Rufus Makombe, the President's brother, Carter also visits the Kilimanjaro nightclub in Dakar and has a liaison with the club's singer, Mirella. She lures Carter to a remote house in the countryside where an attempt is made on his life. Mirella falls into a spear-filled pit and is killed instead. Carter escapes and returns to Nyanga to find that Liz Ashton has been kidnapped. Carter, reinforced by the Nyanga police and army, discover her location and arrive just in time to save her. Rufus Makombe, supported by communist Chinese aid, has planned the assassination of his brother, the overthrow of the government, and the establishment of a communist Chinese foothold in Africa. Carter defeats Rufus in hand-to-hand combat and Rufus's supporters are arrested. Finally, Ten Wong, the Chinese paymaster of the entire operation is tracked down to Casablanca, Morocco. Carter breaks into Wong's fortified house and is nearly killed by triffid-like plants that guard the compound. Ten Wong is lured outside and killed by his own plants.

== Main characters ==
- Nick Carter (agent N-3, AXE)
- Mr Hawk (Carter’s boss, head of AXE)
- Liz Ashton (Second Secretary, US Embassy, Republic of Nyanga)
- Mirella (nightclub singer in Dakar, Senegal)
- Abe Jefferson (Chief of Police, Abimako, Nyanga)
- Julian Makombe (President, Republic of Nyanga)
- Rufus Makombe (brother of Julian Makombe, Carter's adversary)
- Laszlo (henchman of Rufus Makombe/Ten Wong, Carter's adversary)
- Hakim Sadek (Egyptian policeman, lecturer at University of Cairo; Carter's ally)
- Ten Wong (organizer of the plot against Nyanga, Carter's adversary)
