= The Living Death (novel) =

1969 novel by Jon Messmann

The Living Death is the 48th novel in the Nick Carter-Killmaster series of spy novels. Carter is a US secret agent, code-named N-3, with the rank of Killmaster. He works for AXE – a secret arm of the US intelligence services.

== Publishing history ==
The book was first published in 1969 by Award-Tandem Books (Number A496X) by Universal Publishing and Distributing Corporation (New York, USA) and Universal-Tandem Publishing Co. Ltd. (London, England). The novel was written by Jon Messmann.,

== Plot summary ==
AXE receives a request from a Russian woman named Maria Doshtavenko asking to meet a top agent in London. Carter is sent to London where he is contacted and taken to Royal Albert Dock where an attempt is made on his life. Carter meets Doshtavenko on the River Wey near Selborne but she is killed by a sniper before she can reveal anything.

Carter returns to London and traces his dockland assailants. He discovers that renowned Italian space biologist Prof Caldone has been targeted. AXE discovers that seven renowned scientists allied to western countries have become vegetables overnight. They became ill soon after attending meetings of the International Science Scholars (ISS). AXE suspects a novel virus or electromagnetic ray is responsible. Fearing that Caldone will be the next victim, Carter is sent to the next ISS meeting in Portofino, Italy to protect Caldone. After carefully chaperoning the professor, the 3-day meeting wraps up without incident. Only after returning to America does Carter learn that Caldone has indeed become a vegetable.

After studying the attendance lists of every ISS meeting in which a scientist fell ill, Carter travels to Zurich to investigate the ISS secretary, Karl Krisst.

On the train from Rome to Zurich, Carter is accosted by six Russian agents. They admit they have been feeding the names of Western scientists to an unknown source who then selects one and causes their mental collapse soon after by means unknown to them. Carter jumps from the train in mid-journey and escapes but is shot in the leg and badly wounded.

Carter takes refuge in a nearby farm run by a widow and her daughter. The widow tends Carter's wounds and covers for him when the Russians come looking for him. A few days later they return and torture the widow to reveal Carter's whereabouts. Carter kills all the Russians and travels to Zurich.

In Krisst's basement Carter discovers a miniaturized jet injector that Krisst uses to inject his victims with a fast-growing fungus that attacks the brain. Krisst is insane and harbors a grudge against the ISS for not admitting him as a member. Krisst traps Carter in the basement and overpowers him with knockout gas. Carter awakes on a chairlift in the mountains outside Zurich. Krisst cuts the cable as Carter is halfway up the mountain hoping that the fall will kill him. Carter manages to slide down the cable to safety but is chased by Krisst. After a hand-to-hand fight on the slopes, Krisst falls into a crevice. Carter retrieves Krisst's notes and hardware from his house and returns to London where he spends a week with Denny Robertson.

== Main characters ==
- Nick Carter – agent N-3, AXE (posing)
- David Hawk – AXE Chief, Carter's boss
- Prof Caldone – Italian scientist
- Amoretta Caldone – niece of Prof Caldone
- Karl Krisst – ISS secretary
- Emilie Grutska – Swiss farm-owner
- Tom Derringer – AXE expert on personal protection
- Denny Robertson – Carter's girlfriend
