= David Hagberg =

American novelist (1942–2019)

- Born: October 9, 1942
- Died: September 8, 2019 (aged 76)

David Hagberg (October 9, 1942 – September 8, 2019) was an American novelist best known for his techno-thrillers featuring super-spy Kirk McGarvey.

== Career ==
In an interview with The Writer Magazine, Hagberg spoke of his childhood inspiration to become a writer: "I really got the writing bug in the fourth grade when my Teacher read us Little House On The Prairie. At the end of the school year, she said the most astounding thing, 'This woman, Laura Ingalls Wilder, writes these books and she gets paid for it!' Wow! I thought. This is my gig! By the sixth grade, I was writing mystery stories in spiral notebooks."

"I’ve always believed in the power of storytelling. It’s a way to connect with readers on a deep level, to entertain and inform, and sometimes to challenge the way they see the world."

During his service in the U.S. Air Force, an Assistant Dean of English at the University of Wisconsin, responding to Hagberg's inquiry about attending the school to learn how to make a living as a writer, told him, "Go home, have your wife get a part-time job, and give yourself 10 years. You'll know within five years if it's going to happen or not."

Like many "cloak-and-dagger" novelists, Hagberg has a professional background in espionage, having spent his stint of military duty as a cryptographer for U.S. Air Force Intelligence.

Hagberg wrote a short story titled "Genesis" in Twilight Zone: 19 Original Stories on the 50th Anniversary.

His work featured under multiple pseudonyms, including Sean Flannery, Nick Carter, David Bannerman, David James, Robert Pell, and Eric Ramsey.

== Style ==
Hagberg's writing style has been described as a cross between Tom Clancy and Ian Fleming. His thrillers generally feature a combination of technical detail, timely plots and super-spy heroics.

On several occasions, Hagberg's plots have been echoed outside of his fictional worlds. In the novel Joshua's Hammer, for example, written in 2000, Hagberg gives an account of a mega-terrorist plot by Osama bin Laden to kill thousands of Americans on their home soil, published a year before the World Trade Center Attacks. His scenario of McGarvey tracking bin Laden to his urban lair in Pakistan and shooting him in the head—far from Tora Bora's caves—was described and executed in Allah’s Scorpion (2007) four years before the similar event echoed Hagberg's novel.

== Reception ==
His work has been well received by his colleagues in the crime writing community. Three of his novels, The Kremlin Conspiracy, False Prophets, and Broken Idols, were nominated for Edgars by the MWA in the "Best Paperback Original Novel" category. Three of his McGarvey novels, Countdown, Crossfire, and Critical Mass, won American Mystery Awards, given by Mystery Scene Magazine, for "Best Spy Novel."

== Bibliography ==
=== Kirk McGarvey Novels ===
- Without Honor (1989)
- Countdown (1990)
- Crossfire (1991)
- Critical Mass (1992)
- High Flight (1995)
- Assassin (1997)
- White House (1999)
- Joshua's Hammer (2000)
- The Kill Zone (2002)
- Soldier of God (2005)
- Allah's Scorpion (2007)
- Dance with the Dragon (2007)
- The Expediter (2009)
- The Cabal (2010)
- Abyss (2011)
- Castro's Daughter (2012)
- Blood Pact (2014)
- Retribution (2015)
- The Shadowmen (January 2016 novella)
- The Fourth Horseman (February 2016)
- 24 Hours (July 2016 novella)
- End Game (September 2016)
- Tower Down (May 2017)
- Flash Points (March 2018)
- Face Off (October 2018)
- First Kill (May 2019)
- McGarvey (November 2020)
- Gambit (April 2021)
- Traitor (April 2022)

=== Miscellaneous Novels ===
- Twister (1975)
- The Capsule (1976)
- Croc (1976) (writing as David James)
- That Winslow Woman (1977) (writing as Robert Pell)
- The Kummersdorf Connection (1978) (writing as Eric Ramsey)
- Heartland (1983)
- Heroes (1985)
- Last Come the Children (1987)
- Desert Fire (1993)
- Eden's Gate (2001)
- By Dawn's Early Light (2003)
- Terminator 3: Rise Of The Machines (2003)
- Burned (2009)
- Blowout (2012) (With Senator Byron L. Dorgan)
- Gridlock (2013) (With Senator Byron L. Dorgan)
- Crash (2020) (With Lawrence Light)

=== Novels written as Sean Flannery ===
- Kremlin Conspiracy (1979)
- Trinity Factor (1981)
- Eagles Fly (1982)
- Hollow Men (1982)
- Broken Idols (1985)
- False Prophets (1985)
- Gulag (1987)
- Moscow Crossing (1988)
- The Zebra Network (1989)
- Crossed Swords (1989)
- Counterstrike (1990)
- Moving Targets (1991)
- Winner Take All (1994)
- Kilo Option (1996)
- Achilles' Heel (1998)

=== Flash Gordon Novels ===
- Massacre in the 22nd Century (1980)
- War of the Citadels (1980)
- Crisis on Citadel II (1980)
- Forces from the Federation (1981)
- Citadels Under Attack (1981)
- Citadels on Earth (1981)

=== Magic Man Novels (writing as David Bannerman) ===
- The Magic Man (1983)
- The Gamov Factor (1983)
- Pipeline from Hell (1984)
- Call of Honor (1985)

=== Nick Carter – Killmaster Novels (writing as Nick Carter) ===
- Sign of the Prayer Shawl (1976)
- Race of Death (1978)
- The Ouster Conspiracy (1981)
- The Strontium Code (1981)
- Deathlight (1982)
- The Dominican Affair (1982)
- The Puppet Master (1982)
- The Hunter (1982)
- Appointment in Haiphong (1982)
- Operation McMurdo Sound (1982)
- Retreat for Death (1982)
- The Damocles Threat (1982)
- The Istanbul Decision (1983)
- Earthfire North (1983)
- Zero-Hour Strike Force (1984)
- Death Island (1984)
- Death Hand Play (1984)
- The Vengeance Game (1985)
- The Killing Ground (1986)
- Death Orbit (1986)
- Operation Petrograd (1986)
- East of Hell (1987)
