= The China Doll =

1964 novel by Valerie Moolman

First edition

The China Doll is the second novel in the long-running Nick Carter-Killmaster series.

== Publishing history ==
The book was first published in April 1964 (Number A105F) by Award Books part of the Beacon-Signal division of Universal Publishing and Distributing Corporation (New York, USA), part of the Conde Nast Publications Inc. The novel was written by Valerie Moolman. Copyright was registered in the US on 16 June 1964.

== Plot summary ==
After the events described in Run, Spy, Run, Carter is recuperating at home in New York City from another assignment (Operation Ice Pick), when he is assigned to be the personal bodyguard for Nikita Khrushchev during the Soviet Premier’s attendance at the opening session of the United Nations (dating the story to late September 1963). Carter foils two separate assassination attempts on Khrushchev. AXE and its Soviet counterpart (known here as SIN) believe the assassinations are linked to communist Chinese efforts to destabilize relations between the USSR and USA. Carter is sent to Japan to infiltrate a Chinese communist spy ring. He is assisted by a top Russian spy (Comrade Guren). They learn that a Chinese crime syndicate called CLAW, operating from the safety of the Forbidden City in Peking, is behind the destabilization plot. Their mission is to assassinate CLAW’s leader, known only as the Mandarin. Carter and Comrade (disguised as guardsmen of the Forbidden City named Lo Mei Teng and Hong Tu Lee, respectively) leave Japan by boat and arrive in China near Shanghai. They intend to walk to Peking. By chance en route they meet Yasunara (who is Chinese despite her apparently Japanese name), the chief concubine of the Mandarin. After saving her party from an airplane attack, they escort Yasunara by car back to the Forbidden City. Yasunara sees through the disguise and Carter and Comrade are drugged, captured and imprisoned by the Mandarin in an underground labyrinth beneath the Forbidden City. Carter and Comrade are to die by being eaten alive by huge turtles. Using a small concealed knife (Hugo Junior), Carter and Comrade escape, killing the Mandarin and feeding his body to the turtles. Yasunara is knocked out and taken hostage as Carter and Comrade wend their way through the underground maze to an exit near the river. The Mandarin’s second-in-command, Chou Chang, is lying in wait near the exit with armed guards. Prepared to die in the face of overwhelming odds Carter and Comrade make a final stand. Bluffing, they start to strangle Yasunara to trick Chou Chang into revealing his location in the dimly lit cavern. When Chou Chang reveals himself he is wounded by a thrown knife. In the confusion that follows, Carter uses a small poison gas bomb (cousin of Pierre) to overcome the remaining guards and escape. Yasunara stabs and kills Comrade but is herself choked to death by Comrade as he dies. Carter escapes the Forbidden City dons the clothing of a guard and makes his way down to the river, where he is rescued by Julia Baron (Carter's assistant in Run, Spy, Run) and two American agents in a waiting launch who take him to safety.

== Main characters ==
- Nick Carter (agent N-3, AXE, undercover using the assumed names Richard MacArthur, Henry Stewart, Lo Mei Teng)
- Mr Hawk (Carter’s boss, head of AXE)
- Comrade Guren (agent X-17, SIN, undercover using the assumed name Hong Tu Lee)
- The Mandarin (head of CLAW, Carter's adversary)
- Chou Chang (Mandarin's second-in-command)
- Yasunara (chief concubine to the Mandarin) - the China Doll of the title
- Taka (former concubine to the Mandarin, working as Chinese spy in Japan)
- Julia Baron (US agent, previously featured in Run, Spy, Run)
