= Run, Spy, Run =

1964 novel by Michael Avallone and Valerie Moolman

First edition

Run, Spy, Run is the first novel in the long-running Nick Carter-Killmaster series.

== Publishing history ==
The book was first published in February 1964 (Number A101F) by Award Books part of the Beacon-Signal division of Universal Publishing and Distributing Corporation (New York, USA), part of the Conde Nast Publications Inc. Authorship has been attributed jointly to Michael Avallone and Valerie Moolman, although Moolman alone is credited in the Library of Congress records. Copyright was registered in the US on 21 April 1964.

== Plot summary ==
The story takes place in early September 1963. After relaxing following a successful mission in Jamaica, secret agent Nick Carter receives an anonymous letter asking that he return to New York City via a specific flight where the writer will contact him on the plane. On the flight Carter is contacted by stewardess Rita Jameson, who believes Carter to be a private investigator. Carter is asked to help solve the mystery surrounding a plane crash that killed Rita Jameson's pilot fiance and for which he has been named responsible. Also on board is a minor diplomat with an artificial hand. Upon disembarking in New York, the diplomat is killed by a bomb that appears to have been contained within his own artificial hand. Carter learns that "the man with the steel hand" is the fourth anti-Communist politician/diplomat to have been killed by explosions linked to planes in recent months. Their successors are all pro-Communist sympathizers. Rita Jameson is murdered and attempts are made on Carter's life indicating that the crash that killed Jameson's fiance and the murder of "the man with the steel hand" at least are connected. Government agencies around the world suspect that all 4 crashes are indeed linked and cover up the fact (prompting Jameson's independent investigation). Carter and Julia Baron are assigned to protect US Ambassador to the United Nations, Lyle Harcourt - a staunch anti-Communist - as he travels to London. On board, Carter and Baron foil a plot by a suicide bomber to set off a bomb. The would-be bomber commits suicide by poison before he can be interrogated. In London, Carter and Baron contact the US Ambassador to the United Kingdom, Henry Judson. However, they become suspicious of him when he probes the meaning of coded messages sent to Carter from AXE via the embassy. As they leave the embassy, Carter and Baron are knocked out and transported to the London hideout of Mr. Judas - an international terrorist who hires out his services to the highest bidder. He is currently employed by China to destabilise anti-Communist sentiment among world leaders. As they are about to be tortured and murdered by Mr. Judas and his sexually sadistic henchman, Braille, they manage to escape, killing Braille and wounding Mr. Judas in the process. In revenge and to prevent Carter and Baron identifying him in future, Mr. Judas arranges to have Harcourt kidnapped, thereby forcing Carter and Baron to attend a potentially fatal meeting. Carter and Baron meet Mr. Judas to arrange Harcourt's release. Mr. Judas attempts to bribe Carter into planting a bomb on the US President's plane. After a struggle Mr. Judas is thwarted and Harcourt rescued. Mr. Judas escapes into the London fog.

== Main characters ==
- Nick Carter (agent N-3, AXE, undercover using the assumed name Peter Cane)
- Mr Hawk (Carter’s boss, head of AXE)
- Julia Baron (US agent)
- Mr. Judas (international terrorist, Carter's foe)
- Braille (Mr. Judas’ henchman)
- Henry Judson (US Ambassador to UK)
- Lyle Harcourt (US Ambassador to the United Nations)
- Rita Jameson
