= Eye of the Tiger (disambiguation) =

"Eye of the Tiger" is a 1982 song by Survivor.

Eye of the Tiger may also refer to any of the following:

== Film ==
- Sinbad and the Eye of the Tiger, a 1977 fantasy film
- Eye of the Tiger (film), a 1986 action/drama film

== Literature ==
- The Eyes of the Tiger, a 1965 novel in the Nick Carter-Killmaster spy series
- The Eye of the Tiger (novel), a 1975 novel by Wilbur Smith
- Eye of the Tiger, a 1986 novel by Diana Palmer
- The Eye of the Tyger, a 2003 novel by Paul J. McAuley
- Eye of the Tiger, a 2013 novel by Colin Falconer

== Music ==
- Eye of the Tiger (album), the 1982 album by Survivor from which the song was taken

== Television ==
- "Eye of the Tiger", Degrassi: The Next Generation season 4 part 2, episode 16 (2004)
- "Eye of the Tiger", Jade Armor season 1, episode 4 (2022)
- "Eye of the Tiger", Last Hope episode 9 (2018)
- "Eye of the Tiger", Pawn Stars season 12, episode 6 (2015)
- "Eye of the Tiger", Short Cuts episode 15 (2001)
- "Eye of the Tiger", Sinbad episode 9 (2012)
- "Eye of the Tiger", The Bernie Mac Show season 3, episode 1 (2003)
- "Eye of the Tiger", Valt the Wonder Deer season 2, episode 11 (2018)
- "Eye of the Tiger & The Other Woman", Revenge Body with Khloé Kardashian season 2, episode 6 (2018)

== Other uses ==
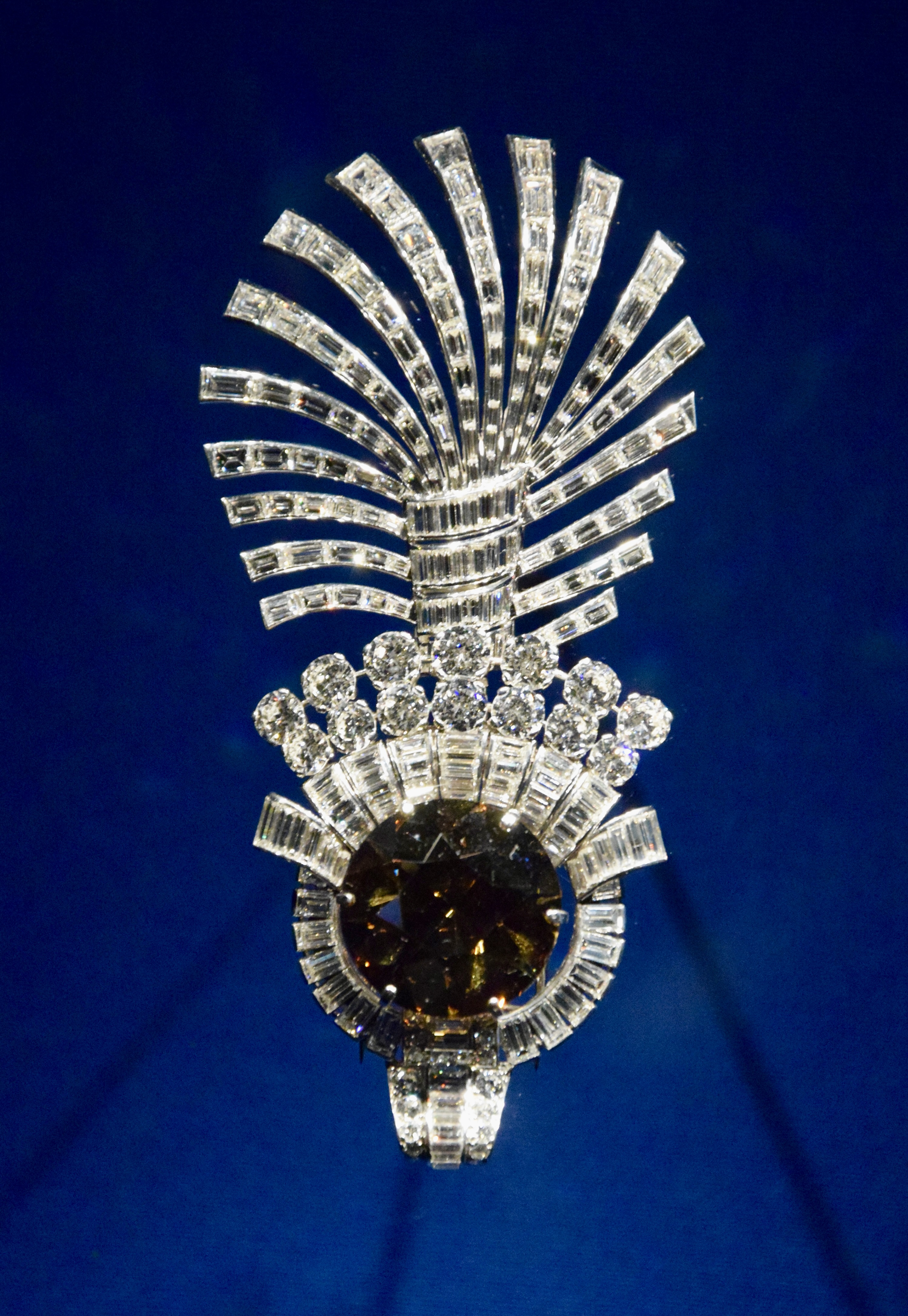
The Eye of the Tiger.

- The Eye of the Tiger, a 61.5-carat brown diamond, part of the jewellery collection of the Indian state of Nawanagar

== See also ==
- Tiger's eye, a gemstone
- The Tiger's Eye: A Jungle Fairy Tale, a short story by L. Frank Baum published in 1962
- "Roar" (song), a 2013 Katy Perry song featuring the lyric "eye of the tiger"
