= Assignment: Israel =

1967 novel by Manning Lee Stokes

- Author: Manning Lee Stokes
- Series: Nick Carter-Killmaster
- Release number: 27
- Genre: Spy fiction
- Published: 1967
- Publisher: Award Books
- Preceded by: A Korean Tiger
- Followed by: The Red Guard

Assignment: Israel is the 27th novel in the long-running Nick Carter-Killmaster series of spy novels. Carter is a US secret agent, code-named N-3, with the rank of Killmaster. He works for AXE – a secret arm of the US intelligence services.

== Publishing history ==
The book was first published in 1967 (Number A260X) by Award Books part of the Beacon-Signal division of Universal Publishing and Distributing Corporation (New York, USA), part of the Conde Nast Publications Inc. The novel was written by Manning Lee Stokes. Copyright was registered on 12 October 1967.

== Plot summary ==
The novel is set in November 1967.

A minor Chinese diplomat is murdered in The Hague. Before his death he passes coded secret material to the American Government. Meanwhile, in Beijing, former Nazi Gunter Gerhardt, receives final instructions on Chinese communist plans to foment war in the Middle East. Gerhardt flies immediately to Syria to organize cross-border armed raids into Israel and Jordan.

In Washington, D.C., the Chinese diplomat's secret message is decoded confirming Gerhardt's plans. AXE collaborates with Israeli intelligence, Shin Bet, to track down Gerhardt and stop him. Carter is recalled from vacation in Switzerland and travels to Marrakesh, Morocco to meet his female Shin Bet colleague, Sabra. From there he heads to Tiberias, Israel to pay off Sheik al-Khalifa, a Bedouin leader who is assisting the Israelis. Carter arranges to meet his contact, the Sheikh's eldest son, but arrives at the location to find him murdered. Carter is captured by two Russian agents, Gregor and Yashmin, who are also searching for Gunter Gerhardt. Carter manages to escape and kill both agents.

Carter, Sabra and Bedouin tribesmen cross the border into Syria and make their way to Sheik al-Khalifa's camp. The Sheikh is paid as agreed earlier. The Sheikh's men know where Gunter Gerhardt's camp is located. The Sheikh loans 20 armed Bedouin tribesmen and a guide to lead Carter and Sabra to Gerhardt.

Meanwhile, Gerhardt prepares his attack at the foot of the Sea of Galilee where Syria, Israel and Jordan share a border. A thousand men disguised as Israeli soldiers will cross the border from Syria into Israel and destroy the kibbutz Sha’ar HaGolan. The dead civilians will be dressed in Israeli uniforms. Then, Gerhardt's forces will cross the border into Jordan and attack Umm Qyas with Lewisite – a poisonous gas. The dead Israeli “soldiers” will be left behind in Umm Qyas. The intention is to force Jordan to declare war on Israel in reprisal for an unprovoked attack on its territory.

Shortly before the attack is to commence, Gerhardt travels alone to the Sheik's camp and has a clandestine meeting with Ali – the Sheikh's second son. Ali has betrayed Carter and Sabra to Gerhardt. Ali is followed to his meeting by Carter and Sabra. Gerhardt shoots Ali. Outgunned, Carter and Sabra do not dare tackle Gerhardt but allow him to leave and return to his camp.

When Carter, Sabra and 20 of the Sheikh's Bedouin tribesman are a short distance from their camp it is destroyed by Syrian MiG-19 jets called in by Gerhardt. The tribesmen return to assess the damage. Incensed by the destruction, the men demand revenge. Carter leads them to attack Gerhardt's camp.

Carter and the Bedouin capture a jeep and half-track sent by Gerhardt to confirm the destruction of the Bedouin's camp. Using a captured radio Sabra sends a message to Israeli paratroopers stationed at Tiberias to come to their assistance. They then set off for Gerhardt's camp.

Carter and the Bedouin tribesmen are badly outnumbered when finally the Israeli paratroopers and Mirage air support arrive. Gerhardt's men are killed or captured. Gerhardt attempts to escape from the camp but is cornered by Carter and Sabra. Gerhardt shoots and kills Sabra before he himself is shot and killed by Carter. Carter carries Sabra's body to the Israeli transport planes departing with the paratroopers and captured prisoners.

== Main characters ==
- Nick Carter – agent N-3, AXE (posing as Robert Thomson)
- David Hawk – head of AXE; Carter's boss,
- Gunter Gerhardt – aka General William Lucy; former Nazi; mercenary
- Levi Eban – head of Shin Bet
- Sabra – codename: Grenade; Shin Bet agent; Carter's ally
- Sheik al-Khalifa – Bedouin leader
- Majhad – Bedouin tracker, undercover CIA agent
- Ali – second son of Sheik al-Khalifa
- Peg Taylor – Carter's girlfriend
