= Valt =

Valt may refer to:

- Giancarlo Valt (born 1941), Italian curler
- Valt the Wonder Deer, TV series
- List of Valt the Wonder Deer episodes
