= Mission to Venice =

1967 novel by Manning Lee Stokes

Mission to Venice is the 21st novel in the long-running Nick Carter series of spy novels. Carter is a US secret agent, code-named N-3, with the rank of Killmaster. He works for AXE – a secret arm of the US intelligence services.

== Publishing history ==
The book was first published in 1967 (Number A228F) by Award Books part of the Beacon-Signal division of Universal Publishing and Distributing Corporation (New York, USA), part of the Conde Nast Publications Inc. The novel was written by Manning Lee Stokes. Copyright was registered on 22 May 1967.

== Plot summary ==
The novel is set in February.

The United States Air Force has lost a plane carrying a hydrogen bomb over the Adriatic Sea between Italy and Yugoslavia. Yugoslavia claims it has located the bomb in deep water off Venice and intends to use it to blackmail Italy into giving up sovereignty of Trieste which is currently administered by the United Nations following World War II.

AXE suspects that the head of Yugoslav Intelligence, Vanni Manfrinto, knows the exact location of the bomb and has the ability to arm it underwater. AXE also suspects that Manfrinto is currently in Venice. Manfrinto's only vice is women and AXE have arranged for one of their operatives, Princess Morgan de Verizone – an international prostitute – to meet up with him. Carter will extract the necessary information from Manfrinto then execute him.

Carter (in disguise as American businessman, Robert Corning) and Princess de Verizone meet up on the Orient Express en route from Paris to Venice and spend the night together. The Princess is being watched by two Yugoslav Intelligence officers on the orders of Manfrinto. They interrogate Carter but accept his cover story. Carter kills the two men and disposes of their bodies as the train reaches Milan.

Carter and the princess get off the train separately at Venice. Carter tries to follow the princess but loses her. He discovers she will meet her contact at the Lion of Saint Mark later that evening. Carter follows the princess and her contact to a deserted casino on the Lido di Venezia. Carter breaks into the casino and establishes that it is indeed Manfrinto's headquarters and that the princess is there. He searches the building thoroughly and then returns to his hotel. In the morning he follows the princess as she returns from her assignation with Manfrinto to her lodgings. Manfrinto's henchmen follow her. Carter shoots and kills the tail but is wounded in an exchange of gunfire. He forces his way into the princess's apartment and reveals his true identity to her.

Carter and the princess join forces. The princess takes up Manfrinto's open invitation for her to return the next evening giving Carter a new opportunity to infiltrate his organization and eliminate him. The princess returns to Manfrinto while Carter lands on a small deserted island opposite the casino. The island is being used as a base for Russian divers and their Yugoslav allies to search the seabed for the missing bomb. Carter kills the divers and disables the support vessel and then swims back to the casino on the Lido. Carter is immediately captured upon entering the casino headquarters.

The princess has been tortured and has revealed Carter's identity to Manfrinto. Carter escapes, kills the guards and captures Manfrinto after a chase and hand-to-hand fight. Just as he is about to torture Manfrinto into revealing the exact location of the bomb, Hawk enters and relieves Carter of his duties. Hawk and Manfrinto are old adversaries. Exhausted, Manfrinto knows he has been beaten and gives himself up to AXE custody. Under interrogation, Manfrinto reveals the location of the bomb and it is made safe.

On the flight back to America Hawk tells Carter that he and Manfrinto were best friends during World War II – Hawk as OSS liaison and Manfrinto as leader of a group of Yugoslav Partisans fighting the Germans. Manfrinto betrayed 50 men to the Germans and only Hawk and two others escaped alive. Hawk tells Carter he has left orders for Manfrinto to be executed.

== Main characters ==
- Nick Carter - agent N-3, AXE; posing as Robert N Corning
- Hawk - head of AXE; Carter's boss,
- Princess Morgan de Verizone – AXE agent, courtesan
- Vanni Manfrinto – head of Yugoslav Intelligence
