= Spy Castle =

1966 novel by Manning Lee Stokes

Spy Castle is the 12th novel in the long-running Nick Carter-Killmaster series of spy novels. Carter is a US secret agent, code-named N-3, with the rank of Killmaster. He works for AXE – a secret arm of the US intelligence services.

== Publishing history ==
The book was first published in January 1966 (Number A166F) by Award Books part of the Beacon-Signal division of Universal Publishing and Distributing Corporation (New York, United States), part of the Conde Nast Publications Inc. The novel was written by Manning Lee Stokes.

== Plot summary ==
The story is set in November 1965. A 50 megaton nuclear missile is launched from Scotland and detonates over the North Pole. A terrorist named Pendragon delivers an ultimatum to heads of state in London, Paris, Rome and Bonn. Russia and United States are excluded. The British secret service contacts AXE for assistance.

The missile launch is traced to Blackscape – an island in the Orkney archipelago controlled by Lord Hardesty – the richest man in the world. His objective is to provoke the destruction of Russia. Carter heads to the north coast of Scotland to begin his investigation. He meets Gwen Leith one of two British Special Branch agents assigned to the mission and under his command. They wait for orders in a cottage and discover that fellow agent, James Stockes, has been captured.

Carter and Leith attend a ceremony on a nearby moor organized by the Militant Druids – a neo-Fascist group supported by Lord Hardesty. Posing as Druids, Carter and Leith infiltrate the ceremony. The highlight is a sexually charged black mass presided over by figure in a devil costume during which agent James Stockes is tied to a cross and burned alive. As an act of mercy, Carter shoots Stockes in the head. The ceremony breaks up in chaos and Carter and Leith attempt to escape across the moor. Leith trips and sprains her ankle; she orders Carter to flee without her.

Carter evades capture and boards the Oban-London overnight mail train. On board he meets Lady Hardesty. She is accompanied by four henchmen employed by her husband to watch over her. She attempts to recruit Carter as her lover, to murder her husband and live with her in luxury. Carter overpowers the guards and escapes from the train. Stranded in the Scottish Highlands he eventually makes his way to London. He meets up with Ian Travers from Scotland Yard Special Branch who arranges for him to be arrested and taken to Dartmoor Prison with Alfie McTurk, one of Pendragon's henchmen.

Carter and McTurk escape from the prison van (with Travers' intervention) en route to Dartmoor and hike across the moor. They stop at an isolated house. McTurk calls his Druid contacts and arranges for a light plane to pick them up. As they wait, McTurk rapes and murders the woman of the house. Carter beats McTurk to death. The plane lands and takes Carter to Blackscape Island.

Lady Hardesty has been imprisoned on the island by her husband. She summons Carter and repeats her plan to have him kill Lord Hardesty so that they can rule the world together. To buy time Carter agrees. As a test of loyalty Carter feigns executing Gwen Leith who has also been held captive on the island. Carter overpowers Lady Hardesty and releases Gwen Leith. Together they successfully destroy the three remaining Titan I missiles hidden in silos on Blackscape Island. Lady Hardesty attempts to flee from Blackscape via a small boat. Gwen Leith attacks her and beats her to death with a rock. Carter and Leith use the small boat to escape the island and are picked by a Royal Navy submarine.

Carter is debriefed by Travers at Scotland Yard. Carter recalls that Lord Hardesty owns a disused movie lot on the outskirts of London and heads there. Lord Hardesty is there alone and asks Carter to kill him rather than bring him to trial. After a scuffle Carter kills him with Hugo – his stiletto.

Carter and Leith recuperate from their injuries and take a holiday together in Dorset.

== Main characters ==
- Nick Carter (agent N-3, AXE; posing as James Ward-Simmons, Major Ralph Camberwell, Sean Mitchell)
- Mr Hawk (Carter's boss, head of AXE)
- Pendragon (Cecil Graves, Lord Hardesty; Carter's foe)
- Lady Brett Hardesty (wife of Lord Hardesty, Carter's foe)
- Ian Travers (Scotland Yard, Special Branch, Carter's ally)
- Gwen Leith (Special Branch; Colonel in M5A; Double O agent; Carter's ally)
- Alfie McTurk (Pendragon's henchman)
- James Stockes (Special Branch; Double O agent)
- Della Stokes (Hawk's private secretary)
