= Double Identity (Killmaster novel) =

1967 novel by Manning Lee Stokes

Double Identity is the 22nd novel in the long-running Nick Carter-Killmaster series of spy novels. Carter is a US secret agent, code-named N-3, with the rank of Killmaster. He works for AXE – a secret arm of the US intelligence services.

== Publishing history ==
The book was first published in 1967 (Number A229X) by Award Books part of the Beacon-Signal division of Universal Publishing and Distributing Corporation (New York, USA), part of the Conde Nast Publications Inc. The novel was written by Manning Lee Stokes. Copyright was registered on 22 May 1967.

== Plot summary ==
The novel is set in October 1965.

Wang-wei, a Chinese spymaster, attends a meeting with Chairman Mao Zedong and Premier Zhou Enlai where he reveals a secret weapon – an American soldier captured during the Korean War who has been held captive, surgically altered and brainwashed into believing he is Nick Carter – a US secret agent.

The double is to attempt to destabilize the ceasefire between India and Pakistan and draw the real Nick Carter into the area where he can be eliminated.

The real Nick Carter has been sent to Tibet investigating the murder of the Tibet AXE chief by Carter's double. He is on his way to the Karakoram Pass into Kashmir guided by Sherpas via the Lamasery of the She Devils, a convent for fallen women, where he is to meet Dyla Lotti – High Priestess of the lamasery and AXE agent – for further instructions.

Carter and his Sherpa guide enter the lamasery. Carter meets Dyla Lotti and she informs him that the AXE chief in Tibet managed to contact her before his death and warn her that the fake Nick Carter would be traveling in her direction. She met the double four days earlier and he told her he was going to Karachi, Pakistan. The High Priestess drugs Carter with yak's milk laced with an aphrodisiac. She intends to delay Carter and his guide until Chinese soldiers arrive to take him to Peking. Hafed, Carter's guide, arrives and gives him an antidote to the drug. Regaining his senses Carter searches the lamasery and finds weapons and a radio receiver / transmitter. The real Dyla Lotti has been killed and replaced by Yang Kwei. Hafed tortures Yang Kwei but she confirms that Carter's double is waiting for him in Karachi.

Carter and Hafed escape just as the Chinese reinforcements are arriving. Hafed is killed in a mortar attack and Carter escapes alone through the Karakoram Pass into Kashmir.

Carter makes his way to Karachi. The newspapers carry reports that American businessman (and undercover US Government arms specialist) Sam Shelton has been murdered in his home. The murderer was caught by the police and identified as Nick Carter – who promptly announced to the media that he killed Shelton on the orders of the US Government. The double is then sprung from prison by an armed gang. Carter breaks into Shelton's home looking for clues. He finds evidence that US weapons have been released and shipped to the Pakistan Army on the orders of Carter's double. Carter discovers that the double has returned to Shelton's house to confront him. They battle in the darkness but the double escapes.

Carter teams up with Mike Bannion - a destitute alcoholic expatriate American living in Pakistan. Bannion collects supplies paid for by Carter as he recuperates in Bannion's home. Bannion accompanies Carter as they track down the missing weapons, which are being taken from Karachi to Lahore up the Indus River escorted by Pakistani soldiers. Halfway between Kot Addu and Layyah, on a large sandbank, they discover the butchered remains of the escort. Carter and Bannion think that the weapons have been seized by Pathan tribesman in order to start a jihad. They cross to the west bank of the Indus and start to pursue the tribesman. After a mile they discover the body of one of the soldiers. In his mouth is a note from Carter's double daring him to catch him.

Carter and Bannion follow the double up the Indus valley for four days until they reach Peshawar. Carter's double meets up with Beth Cravens – an American now working as a Chinese agent and posing as a Peace Corps worker. Carter follows them closely and overhears their plans. The double's orders have been changed from murdering the real Nick Carter to trying to capture him.

Carter follows Beth Cravens and the fake Nick Carter to a meeting they have scheduled with leaders of the Pathan tribesmen between Peshawar and the Khyber Pass. Carter discovers the weapons cache from Pakistan and sets a makeshift bomb to destroy it.

While waiting for the bomb to go off he knocks out and ties up his double and confronts Beth Cravens – giving her the opportunity to defect back to the United States. Cravens refuses. Mike Bannion follows Carter and mistakenly releases the double. The double takes Bannion hostage. Carter shoots both Bannion and the double. Cravens is killed in the crossfire.

The double's body is shipped back to China with the help of the British Trade Commission. Wang-wei is summoned to a final meeting with Mao Zedong and Zhou Enlai where he is informed of his failure and his fate.

== Main characters ==
- Nick Carter - agent N-3, AXE
- Hawk - head of AXE; Carter's boss,
- Wang-wei – Chief of Coordination of Chinese Secret Services
- William Martin (aka Turtle Nine) – brainwashed American POW; Chinese agent; Carter's double
- Beth Cravens – Chinese agent, posing as Peace Corps worker
- Michael Joseph Bannion – destitute expatriate American living in Pakistan
- Dyla Lotti – High Priestess in Lamasery of the She Devils, Tibet; AXE agent
- Yang Kwei – Chinese agent, posing as Dyla Lotti
- Hafed – Carter's Sherpa guide
