= Macao (novel) =

1968 novel by Manning Lee Stokes

Macao is the 31st novel in the long-running Nick Carter-Killmaster series of spy novels. Carter is a US secret agent, code-named N-3, with the rank of Killmaster. He works for AXE – a secret arm of the US intelligence services.

== Publishing history ==
The book was first published in 1968 by Award-Tandem Books (Number A294X) by Universal Publishing and Distributing Corporation (New York, USA) and Universal-Tandem Publishing Co. Ltd. (London, England). The novel was written by Manning Lee Stokes. Copyright was registered on 23 February 1968.

== Tagline ==
His assignment was to lure a depraved beauty into suicide – His mission was to save the United States from destruction!

Theodore Blacker – small-time conman, drug-dealer and nightclub owner – is attempting to sell a pornographic film of himself and minor Portuguese royalty, Princess Morgan da Gama, to Chinese, African and Portuguese interests for GBP 250,000.

The Princess’s uncle is a Portuguese government minister. Exposing or threatening to expose the film of the Princess gives the film’s owner leverage over the Portuguese government. Prince Sobhuzi Askari –rebel leader seeking Angolan independence from Portugal - wants the film to undermine Portuguese control over Angola. General Auguste Boulanger – Askari’s deputy and leader of the Angolan rebel army – has secretly reached out to China – which supports the Angolan rebellion by buying illegal diamonds – to murder Blacker and steal the film. The Portuguese government wants to destroy the film and force the Princess back to Portugal and into an asylum to ensure her silence.

Bored after two months without an assignment AXE agent Nick Carter is in on leave in London. He encounters the drunken Princess da Gama in a club and takes her back to his flat to recover. He finds Blacker’s business card in the Princess’s purse and goes to Blacker’s nightclub to investigate. Blacker and his henchmen have been murdered and the club ransacked. Carter is followed and assaulted by three African men but manages to escape. Later he is confronted by Major Carlos Oliveira of Portuguese intelligence who tries to persuade Carter to hand over the Princess to the custody of the Portuguese embassy. Carter declines. Oliveira is then assassinated by the three African men. Hawk calls from London Airport and tells Carter to bring the Princess to a secret AXE location in the Isle of Dogs.

Hawk wants Carter and the Princess, posing as a married couple, to travel to Macau via Hong Kong. Carter is to assassinate Colonel Chun Li, Hawk’s opposite number in Chinese counter-intelligence.

Chun Li’s intermediaries call Carter in Hong Kong and arrange a meeting in Macau. Carter attempts to get information from an old informant in Hong Kong. Instead, he finds Prince Askari has murdered the informant for setting up the Prince to be killed by Boulanger and Chun Li in Macau. Carter and the Prince join forces. The Prince wants Boulanger murdered for attempting to usurp him. Carter, the Prince and the Princess go to Macau.

Carter fails to keep his appointment with Chun Li knowing it is a trap. Instead, he breaks into General Boulanger’s hotel room and convinces him that he must work with AXE to kill Chun Li or face being killed by either Chun Li or Prince Askari. The General agrees to bring Chun Li to a place designated by Carter later that evening – a cheap brothel. Before Chun Li arrives, the brothel is raided by Portuguese military police. Prince Askari – wearing a stolen Portuguese military uniform – is arrested and Carter and the Princess captured.

Carter and the Princess awake chained to the wall of a dungeon in Chun Li’s headquarters. General Boulanger is brought in and fed alive to giant mutant rats. Carter learns that his capture is merely bait to get David Hawk to arrive and negotiate his release whereupon he will be captured and killed.

Carter and the Princess are to be eaten alive by the rats. Carter kills some of the rats and uses their bodies to feed to the others diverting them from their intended purpose. Chun Li and some guards return to the cell to investigate. Carter breaks free from his rusty chains and kills Chun Li and the guards. Prince Askari breaks into the dungeon and helps Carter and the Princess escape.

They all return to Hong Kong. Prince Askari and Princess Morgan announce that they are to be married and leave Hong Kong immediately. Carter takes a few days leave in Hong Kong.

== Main characters ==
- Nick Carter – agent N-3, AXE (posing as Frank Manning)
- David Hawk – head of AXE; Carter’s boss
- Princess Morgan da Gama – libertine; member of Portuguese royal family
- Prince Sobhuzi Askari –Angolan rebel leader
- General Auguste Boulanger –renegade French army officer working for Prince Askari
- Colonel Chun Li –head of Chinese counter-intelligence
- Major Carlos Oliveira – Portuguese intelligence officer
- Theodore Blacker – British conman
