= Temple of Fear =

1968 novel by Manning Lee Stokes

Temple of Fear is the 36th novel in the long-running Nick Carter-Killmaster series of spy novels. Carter is a US secret agent, code-named N-3, with the rank of Killmaster. He works for AXE – a secret arm of the US intelligence services.

== Publishing history ==
The book was first published in October 1968 (Number A367X) by Award Books part of the Beacon-Signal division of Universal Publishing and Distributing Corporation (New York, USA), part of the Conde Nast Publications Inc. The novel was written by Manning Lee Stokes. Copyright was registered on 16 October 1968.

== Plot summary ==
The story is set in late April. David Hawk, chief of AXE, is asked by the head of British intelligence to assassinate Richard Philston – former head of MI6 who subsequently defected to Russia. It is rumored that Philston will venture out of Russia to organize a massive sabotage operation in Japan. Hawk suspects that the British government really wants Philston arrested and charged with treason but that Cecil Aubrey, current head of MI6, wants Philston murdered as revenge for Philston's seduction of Aubrey's wife and her subsequent suicide.

Meanwhile, Carter is kidnapped from his apartment by four young Japanese women (Tonaka, Kato, Sato, Mato). Tonaka is the daughter of Kunizo Matu - Carter's martial arts teacher and former Japanese secret service agent – who saved Carter's life in London many years ago. The women insist Carter come to Tokyo immediately. Upon arrival, Carter is given the identity of Pete Fremont, a drunken American journalist, and meets Kunizo Matu.

Matu has recently contacted Cecil Aubrey about the presence of Richard Philston in Tokyo. He too is aware of Philston's plan to use Chinese communist infiltrators led by Johnny Chow to organize widespread sabotage in Japan. Matu asks for Carter's help to kill or capture Philston. Matu objects to the Chinese communists using Matu's discriminated underclass – the Eta or Burakumin – as scapegoats for sabotage plots by foreign powers. Before Matu can reveal Philston's location in Tokyo he is killed by an assassin. Carter gives chase but loses the gunman in the San'ya slums.

Carter receives a parcel from Johnny Chow – a severed human breast which Carter assumes is Tonaka's. A note instructs Fremont to meet Johnny Chow in Ginza. Before he can get there, Carter (as Fremont) is picked up by minders and taken to a large house in the suburbs where he meets Philston. Philston requires the services of a journalist with wide connections. He will pay Fremont USD 50,000 (worth more than $340,000 in 2014) to plant a story in the world's press. The Emperor of Japan is to be assassinated and Fremont is to ensure that Chinese communists are blamed.

Philston sends Carter to meet Johnny Chow. Chow is unaware of the assassination plot. He thinks Fremont is being employed to plant stories about the Eta as the organisers of the sabotage plot. When he arrives at Chow's base he finds Tonaka. She is unharmed and has been working with Chow.

Tonaka reveals that she is a colonel in Chinese intelligence. She is a communist agitator working with Johnny Chow to encourage the Eta to overthrow the imperialist Japanese. Carter is taken to the basement of a dockside warehouse where he finds Kato dead inside a torture device similar to an iron maiden.

Carter is handcuffed, drugged and left under guard. He reawakens 24 hours later and escapes by breaking his own hand to remove the handcuffs. He races to the Tokyo Imperial Palace to warn the Emperor. Johnny Chow and Tonaka are outside the palace grounds leading a mob to try to break into the palace while a citywide power outage takes place. Carter shoots Chow and Tonaka is killed when mounted police charge the rioting mob. Carter enters the grounds and finds his friend from the American embassy assisting the police. The embassy official tells Carter that the Emperor is not in residence today. He is at his personal shrine in Fujiyoshida. Philston has fooled everyone. Carter commandeers a car and drives to the shrine 30 miles away.

Carter arrives at the shrine and stalks Philston among the grounds. Carter catches up with Philston just as he enters the shrine and finds the Emperor in prayer. Carter kills Philston with his knife. The Emperor thanks Carter and gives him a medallion as a token of thanks. Carter uses the Emperor's camera to take a photo of Philston.

When Carter returns to Washington he is called to a meeting with Hawk and Cecil Aubrey – who repeats his request to AXE to murder Richard Philston. Hawk shows him a photograph of the dead Philston.

== Main characters ==
- Nick Carter –agent N-3, AXE; posing as Pete Fremont, ex-patriate American journalist
- David Hawk – head of AXE; Carter's boss
- Cecil Aubrey – Head, MI6
- Richard Philston – former British spy defected to Russia
- Kunizo Matu – former Japanese secret service agent; Carter's friend
- Johnny Chow – Chinese communist agitator in Japan
- Tonaka – daughter of Kunizo Matu
