= The Red Guard (novel) =

1967 novel by Manning Lee Stokes

The Red Guard is the 28th novel in the long-running Nick Carter-Killmaster series of spy novels. Carter is a US secret agent, code-named N-3, with the rank of Killmaster. He works for AXE – a secret arm of the US intelligence services.

== Plot summary ==
The novel is set in October 1967.

Sun Yat, an elderly Chinese bookseller in San Francisco's Chinatown is murdered by Mafia hitmen who stage the murder to make it look like a Tong assassination. The murdered man is a double agent employed by AXE and Chinese communist agents.

Carter is summoned to a meeting of the Joint Intelligence Chiefs at CIA headquarters. Carter learns that Fan Su – an anti-communist agent he helped on an earlier mission (described in Dragon Flame) has requested his help in supporting an anti-communist underground movement within China. Fan Su is currently in San Francisco. Carter also learns that Chinese forces are constructing a 500-mile long tunnel beneath the Chumbi Valley from Tibet into India to invade India and to conceal construction of the world's largest hydrogen bomb. Carter's mission is to enter China and destroy the bomb and tunnel before they can be used.

Carter heads to San Francisco to meet Fan Su. He visits a pharmacist in Chinatown where Sun Yat delivered his secret materials for forwarding to AXE. Carter is met by a Chinese acupuncturist who gives the correct response to his coded introduction. The Chinese man attacks Carter with curare-tipped acupuncture needles but is overpowered and killed. Carter finds the real contact dead in a closet and Fan Su tied up next to him. Carter and Fan Su kill another two agents as they escape from the pharmacy.

They head to a safe house in Los Angeles and plan their strategy. Carter will travel to Pusan where he will take a submarine to Shanghai. There he will meet up with Fan Su who will enter China via Hong Kong. Together they will head across China to Tibet with assistance from an elderly warlord known to Fan Su. If the mission to destroy the bomb in the Chumbi valley is a success the CIA will support Fan Su's anti-communist Undertong movement.

After spending several days in Shanghai, Carter learns that Po-Choy, Fan Su's half-brother and a fellow ringleader of the underground movement who had infiltrated the Red Guard, has been captured and tortured by the Red Guard. To prevent him revealing any information that might compromise the mission Carter and Fan Su kill Po-Choy as he is paraded at a Red Guard rally. Carter and Fan Su escape from Shanghai with the assistance of a CIA-operated Civil Air Transport plane which takes them deep into China yet still 500 miles from the Chumbi valley.

In the Chinese hinterland, Fan Su's family friend, a local warlord named General Teng Fa, provides shelter and armed guides while they wait for a CIA plane from Sikkim to take them to the Chumbi valley. General Teng tells Carter of an unguarded valley running parallel to Chumbi valley with ancient carved steps that will provide a shortcut into the Chumbi valley. Teng warns Carter that the place is called the Valley of the Yeti.

Carter and Fan Su arrive at the valley by parachute. Carter leaves Fan Su alone guarding their camp and infiltrates the secret tunnel excavation where he plants a small atomic grenade near the unfinished H-bomb assembly. The bomb is timed to explode 30 minutes after Carter and Fan Su are picked up by helicopter at their pre-arranged landing site.

Carter hears shots as he scales the cliff to return to Fan Su. Carter finds only blood stains, a bent rifle and giant footprints. Carter follows the bloodstains and footprints and discovers Fan Su's mangled body. She has been killed by some large animal – possibly a Yeti. Carter follows the wounded animal into a series of interconnected caves but loses it. Carter is picked up by the CIA helicopter and returns to base in Sikkim as the tunnel and bomb are destroyed.

== Main characters ==
- Nick Carter – agent N-3, AXE (posing as Jerry Hunt)
- David Hawk – head of AXE; Carter's boss
- Fan Su – head of anti-communist underground; Carter's ally
- General Teng Fa – Chinese warlord; family friend of Fan Su
- Po-Choy – Fan Su's half-brother; commander of Red Guards
- Charles Donnellen – deputy-director, CIA
- Debbie Hunt – Carter's god-daughter

== Publishing history ==
The book was first published in 1967 (Number A261X) by Award Books part of the Beacon-Signal division of Universal Publishing and Distributing Corporation (New York, USA), part of the Conde Nast Publications Inc. The novel was written by Manning Lee Stokes. Copyright was registered on 12 October 1967.
