= The Golden Serpent =

Twentieth spy novel in the Nick Carter-Killmaster series

The Golden Serpent is the 20th novel in the long-running Nick Carter-Killmaster series of spy novels. Carter is a US secret agent, code-named N-3, with the rank of Killmaster. He works for AXE – a secret arm of the US intelligence services.

== Publishing history ==
The book was first published in 1967 (Number A216F) by Award Books part of the Beacon-Signal division of Universal Publishing and Distributing Corporation (New York, USA), part of the Conde Nast Publications Inc. The novel was written by Manning Lee Stokes. Copyright was registered on 30 January 1967.

== Plot summary ==
The story is set in July 1966.

The US Treasury is concerned about the enormous extent of counterfeit $5 bills in circulation.

A minor operative in the counterfeiting group based in Mexico steals $500,000 worth of counterfeit money [~$3.6 million in 2013] and flies to a pre-arranged meeting with gang members on the US side of the border with Mexico. He is killed as his plane crashes before he makes contact and the wreckage is discovered by US police.

AXE chief, David Hawk, summons US secret agent, Nick Carter, to a meeting with the CIA in San Diego. They discuss the Serpent Party – a new political party in Mexico – whose manifesto calls for the return of Texas, New Mexico, Arizona and California to Mexico which is suspected of printing and distributing counterfeit money to support their activities. CIA surveillance of the Chinese nuclear submarine fleet reveals that one of them is missing; it is suspected of bringing in supplies of quality printing paper to the counterfeiters.

Immediately after the briefing Carter embarks on a US Navy submarine (USS Homer S. Jones) to take him to the Mexican coast with orders to smash the counterfeiting operation.

He makes his way on foot inland toward Durango. Posing as an itinerant gold miner he stops at a deserted gold mine near Cosala and discovers the body of a recently killed former SS member.

Continuing his cover as a gold panner Carter is approached by Gerda von Rothe. She is expecting to meet the SS man whom she intends to hire to murder several of her business acquaintances in her nearby castle. Believing Carter to be an itinerant she hires him instead and tells him to come secretly to the castle at midnight.

Shortly afterwards, Carter is captured by El Tigre – a Mexican bandit covertly funded by the CIA. El Tigre informs Carter that his men saw Maxwell Harper (Gerda's business partner) kill the SS man. Carter persuades El Tigre to help him enter and destroy the castle.

Gerda tells Carter that he must kill Harper and Hurtado (a Chinese spy working for Harper) who are using her castle as the base for printing the counterfeit money. She hides Carter in a secret passage in the library and sets up a fake meeting with Harper and Hurtado. At an arranged time, Gerda will leave the library allowing Carter to emerge from the secret hiding place and shoot the two men. During the meeting, Hurtado reveals that he knows Harper is a double agent – working for China and Russia, which is why the Serpent Party and counterfeit distribution are not doing as well as expected. Harper shoots Hurtado. Instead of killing Harper, Carter escapes down the secret passage into the depths of the castle.

Carter discovers the rat-eaten skeletons of four men chained up in the castle dungeons – the remains of the former lovers of Gerda van Rothe. Nearby Carter finds the printing presses for the counterfeit banknotes. He destroys the printing plates and frees the captive print workers.

Gerda's private guards kill all of the Chinese soldiers running the counterfeiting operation. Carter destroys two Chinese mini submarines used to distribute the counterfeit notes and calls for support from the USS Homer S. Jones. Unable to escape, Carter is captured. Gerda ties Carter to her bed while Erma tortures him. Gerda cuts Carter free and forces herself on him. Gerda explains that she used to be a member of the Hitler Youth. She and her parents escaped to Mexico after World War II with genuine printing plates for US banknotes secretly obtained by the Abwehr. Unable to use them for years due to a lack of proper paper, she recently teamed up with Chinese spies to produce counterfeit money to support the Serpent Party and destabilize the US economy. In the throes of passion Carter slips his cyanide suicide pill into Gerda's mouth. Gerda dies. A wounded Harper bursts into the bedroom and is shot by Erma. Carter fights Erma and she falls to her death from the bedroom window. El Tigre and his men attack the castle as pre-arranged with Carter. Carter allows the bandits to loot the castle.

Carter returns to the USS Homer S. Jones which rams and sinks the Chinese nuclear submarine Sea Dragon before returning to San Diego.

== Main characters ==
- Nick Carter - agent N-3, AXE; posing as Carter Manning, Jamie McPherson
- Mr Hawk - head of AXE; Carter's boss,
- Gerda von Rothe - owner of international cosmetics company; Nazi sympathizer
- Maxwell Harper - business partner of Gerda von Rothe; treasurer of Serpent Party
- Hurtado - real name Chung Hee; Chinese agent
- Erma - Gerda's female bodyguard
- El Tigre - real name Hermano; Mexican bandit; Carter's ally
