= The Devil's Cockpit =

1967 novel by Manning Lee Stokes

The Devil's Cockpit is the 23rd novel in the long-running Nick Carter-Killmaster series of spy novels. Carter is a US secret agent, code-named N-3, with the rank of Killmaster. He works for AXE – a secret arm of the US intelligence services.

== Publishing history ==
The book was first published in 1967 (Number A238X) by Award Books part of the Beacon-Signal division of Universal Publishing and Distributing Corporation (New York, USA), part of the Conde Nast Publications Inc. The novel was written by Manning Lee Stokes. Copyright was registered on 10 July 1967.

== Plot summary ==
The novel is set in September 1966.

Carter is summoned to Hawk's office where he meets a representative of the CIA. Carter is shown a box containing the shriveled genitals of a man – the only remains of a CIA agent investigating a communist pornography ring based in Budapest, Hungary. Assisted by Hollywood movie director, Preston Mohr, AXE identifies the films as the work of Michael Blackstone – a once famous director blacklisted and forced into exile during anti-communist purges. Several of the films feature Mona Manning – a former Hollywood actress forced into making pornography due to her waning career and poor mental health.

Carter is ordered to infiltrate the pornography ring and targets Paulus Werner – a West German national who recruits young women from the UK and Western Europe for the pornographers under the cover of a travelling theatrical troupe. Werner was last seen in London by the CIA agent who was subsequently murdered and mutilated.

Carter goes to London and stakes out Soho posing as spiv Nathan Connors. He picks up Pamela Martin, an English prostitute, and discovers that she is familiar with Paulus Werner's attempts to recruit prostitutes for overseas trips. Carter offers Pamela GBP 50 to bring Werner to her flat on the pretext of being interested in going to Europe with him. Carter lies in wait and interrogates Werner when he returns with Pamela. Werner identifies Bela Kojak as his contact in Budapest and reveals that the entire pornography ring is organized by the mysterious Dr Miljas Eros with the involvement of Chinese diplomat, Fang Chi. Carter kills Werner.

Carter recruits Pamela with the promise of a job in AXE if the mission is successful. Posing as Jacob Werner, Paulus Werner's cousin, Carter and Pam lead the theatrical troupe by train from Vienna to Budapest. At their hotel, Carter discovers a stash of heroin hidden in the theatrical troupe's equipment and suspects Paulus Werner of operating a clandestine drug smuggling ring. In Pest, Carter hires a small boat to take him up the Danube to Vác, where Michael Blackstone lives in a villa.

At the villa Carter discovers Pamela and the other girls in the troupe have already been drugged and transported there. They are held captive by two female German guards – whom Carter assumes are ex-Nazi concentration camp guards. Carter enters the villa and kills three male staff and the two female guards. Before he can free the captive women Carter eavesdrops on a high-level meeting between Blackstone, his wife, Bela Kojak, Fang Chi and Mona Manning.

Carter hides in Bela Kojak's car and is taken to a castle on the Danube – the set for the pornographic films. Carter is captured, stripped, shackled to the floor and subjected to peine forte et dure – crushed under heavy stones. Carter sticks to his Jacob Werner cover story. Kojak believes him to be a superior American agent and surmises he is indeed Nick Carter and debates whether to sell him to Russian or to Chinese authorities. As a last gambit Carter reveals the heroin he found stashed in the kit of the girls prepared by Paulus Werner and informs Kojak that someone in his organization is using him to bring heroin into the country – a capital offence. Carter informs him that Paulus Werner was probably working with Dr Miljas Eros. Kojak then reveals that he is in fact Dr Miljas Eros - second in command of Hungarian State Security Police.

Carter is drugged and forced to perform in a sex act whilst being filmed. He is untied and taken back to the castle dungeon. He escapes and kills three guards. Carter searches the castle and sets fire to the room used to store the pornographic movies. As he is leaving the castle he encounters Michael and Sylvia Blackstone and Mona Manning escaping on foot. He forces them back to the castle to release the captive girls. Sylvia Blackstone refuses to leave. Michael Blackstone, Mona Manning, Pamela Martin and Carter head for Blackstone's cruiser moored nearby. They embark on a high-speed chase down the Danube toward the border with Austria. On the way, Blackstone expresses concern about what will happen to him when he is repatriated to America. He goes below deck and shoots Mona Manning and then himself. The cruiser is disabled by gunfire from their pursuers. Carter and Pamela tie themselves together and dive overboard, negotiating the underwater nets that prevent unauthorized entry and exit into Hungary. Exhausted Carter and Pamela wash up on the banks of the Danube inside Austria.

Hawk informs Carter that the mission has been a success and asks what he will do about Pamela Martin who is still recovering in hospital. Carter refuses to see her and drives home to his apartment.

== Main characters ==
- Nick Carter – agent N-3, AXE; posing as Nathan Connors, Jacob Werner
- Hawk – head of AXE; Carter’s boss,
- Pamela Martin – English prostitute, real name: Pamela Haworth
- Dr Miljas Eros – aka Bela Kojak, Paulus Werner’s contact on Budapest; second in command, Hungarian State Security Police
- Paulus Werner – German procurer
- Michael Blackstone – Hollywood film director
- Mona Manning – Hollywood actress
- Sylvia Blackstone – Michael Blackstone’s wife
- Fang Chi – Chinese paymaster in Budapest
- Glenn Boynton – CIA liaison with AXE
- Preston Mohr – Hollywood film director
- Geoffrey Poindexter – head of Special Effects and Editing, AXE
- Della Stokes – Hawk’s personal secretary
