= The Filthy Five =

1967 novel by Manning Lee Stokes

The Filthy Five is the 29th novel in the long-running Nick Carter-Killmaster series of spy novels. Carter is a US secret agent, code-named N-3, with the rank of Killmaster. He works for AXE – a secret arm of the US intelligence services.

== Publishing history ==
The book was first published in 1967 (Number A276X) by Award Books part of the Beacon-Signal division of Universal Publishing and Distributing Corporation (New York, USA), part of the Conde Nast Publications Inc. The novel was written by Manning Lee Stokes. Copyright was registered on 15 November 1967.

== Plot summary ==
The novel is set in August 1967.

Communist China has recently exported $1 billion worth of gold (about $44 billion in 2013), to fund a secret operation and Chinese troops are massing on their border with North Vietnam. Special Branch and MI5 alert AXE to the fact that Sir Malcolm Drake has recently visited Hanoi and has secretly met senior Chinese Government officials in Beijing.

Carter is ordered to meet Monica Drake, wife of Sir Malcolm Drake, in Puerto Rico. Carter reconnoitres Drake's vast estate on the western coast of Puerto Rico which is guarded by mercenaries led by former Australian Army sergeant-major, Harry Crabtree. Monica Drake and Carter rendezvous underwater near the wreck of a sunken Spanish galleon. Drake hands Carter a book wrapped in a waterproof covering. They are attacked by frogmen and Monica Drake is killed.

As Carter drives to Ponce, to catch a flight to San Juan, he saves Dona Lanzos from being attacked. However, she is employed by Malcolm Drake. She accompanies Carter as far as Mayaguez where she has arranged for his car to be ambushed. Carter crashes the car into a field and escapes. He manages to make contact with an AXE agent stationed at the Mayaguez Missile Tracking Station. Returning to San Juan, Carter meets Hawk who has learned from his CIA and MI5 counterparts that someone in the Caribbean is hiring petty criminals and that five convicted murderers in Cuba have been allowed to escape. Drake is the main suspect and Hawk orders Carter to return to Drake's private island, Gallows Key, adjacent to his estate on Puerto Rico, to investigate further.

A secret message encoded in the book Monica Drake gave to Carter reveals a plot to assassinate the President of the United States and implicating Cuba as the instigator. While the US fights Cuba, China will invade North Vietnam to prevent Ho Chi Minh from surrendering to the US. The billion dollars' worth of gold is to pay Malcolm Drake to arrange the assassination and to establish his own country by invading Haiti.

Carter is captured on Gallows Key and interrogated by Malcolm Drake. Drake reveals that the plan to assassinate the President of the United States was merely a ploy to get the gold from China to support his invasion of Haiti. When his overthrow of François Duvalier is complete he will turn anti-communist and seek US support for his new regime in Haiti. Drake orders Crabtree to take Carter to an isolated cell and kill him. As insurance, he separately orders Dona Lanzos to kill Crabtree using a flamethrower. Carter manages to kill Crabtree and Lanzos and escape into the island's undergrowth.

Carter heads for the pier and stows away on Sir Malcolm's PT boat. The PT heads into the Mona Passage where it meets up with a tramp steamer transporting the gold bullion from China. Sir Malcolm and his men board the vessel and kill the crew. Carter stows away on board the tramp steamer. Shortly after the ship begins to list as Drake has ordered it to be scuttled with the gold still on board. Carter watches as Drake and the crew escape on the PT boat but Drake suddenly dives overboard and returns to the sinking ship as the PT boat explodes – killing any witnesses to the location of the gold. Drake clambers aboard and prepares to launch one of the tramp steamer's dinghies. Carter confronts him. The ship is sinking fast. Drake does not want to be arrested and hanged for the murder of his wife or sent to an asylum. He is washed overboard and is last seen swimming out to sea before disappearing. Carter casts off in the dinghy and tries to sail back to Puerto Rico. He is picked up by a US Navy destroyer. Drake's invasion force on Gallows Key is attacked by combined Haitian and Cuban forces tipped off by AXE informers.

== Main characters ==
- Nick Carter – agent N-3, AXE (posing as Jim Talbot)
- David Hawk – head of AXE; Carter's boss
- Sir Malcolm Drake – writer, journalist, adventurer, communist agent
- Harry Crabtree – Drake's subordinate; former sergeant-major, Australian Army
- Monica Drake – wife of Malcolm Drake; sleeper agent for British intelligence
- Dona Lanzos – agent of Malcolm Drake
