= Manning Lee Stokes =

American novelist

- Born: June 21, 1911; St. Louis, Missouri
- Died: January 5, 1976 (aged 64); Peekskill, New York
- Occupation: Novelist
- Spouse: March Lurea Marlow (m. 1959)
- Relatives: Ben McCutcheon Stokes (brother, 1919-1957); Robert Noel Stokes (brother, 1915-1972) and Robert Noel Stokes, Jr, nephew (1949- ), William George Stokes (nephew, 1950- ), and Diane Lee Stokes (niece, 1953- ); Virginia Lee Stokes McCown (sister, 1921-2000) and James McCown (nephew) and Robert McCown (nephew, d. 2025).
- Writing career
- Language: English
- Genre: Fiction

Manning Lee Stokes (June 21, 1911 – January 5, 1976) was an American novelist who used a large number of pseudonyms. He specialized in paperback fiction, especially in the genres of mystery, detective fiction, westerns, spy fiction and science fiction. Stokes is also notable as one of the innovators of graphic novels.

== Early life ==
On 21 June 1911, Stokes was born in St. Louis, Missouri. His father was William John Stokes (1881–1948) and his mother was Bearnice Lee (1882–1975).

== Personal ==
In Sept 1957, Stokes's brother, Ben McCutcheon Stokes, died in Indianapolis, Indiana.

Stokes married March Lurea Marlow on September 26, 1959, who was previously married to his brother, Ben McCutcheon Stokes (April 15, 1919 – September 22, 1957). They had no children of their own but Marlow had two children with his brother: Bearnice Lee Stokes (born April 29, 1953) and Benita McCutcheon Stokes (born Feb 04, 1956).

On January 5, 1976, Stokes died at his home in Peekskill, now a part of Cortlandt Manor, Westchester County, New York. He is buried in a National Cemetery located in Farmingdale, New York.

== Career ==
Starting in 1945, Stokes published by his own name and at least 9 different pseudonyms. He also worked as a comic book writer, scripting Seven Sea Comics for Iger and the graphic novel The Case of the Winking Buddha for St. John in 1950, illustrated by Charles Raab, who had assisted Milton Caniff on Terry and the Pirates and Alfred Andriola on Charlie Chan. Created in the wake of the success of It Rhymes with Lust—often regarded as the first graphic novel—The Case of the Winking Buddha was later reprinted in Authentic Police Cases #25 (January 1953).

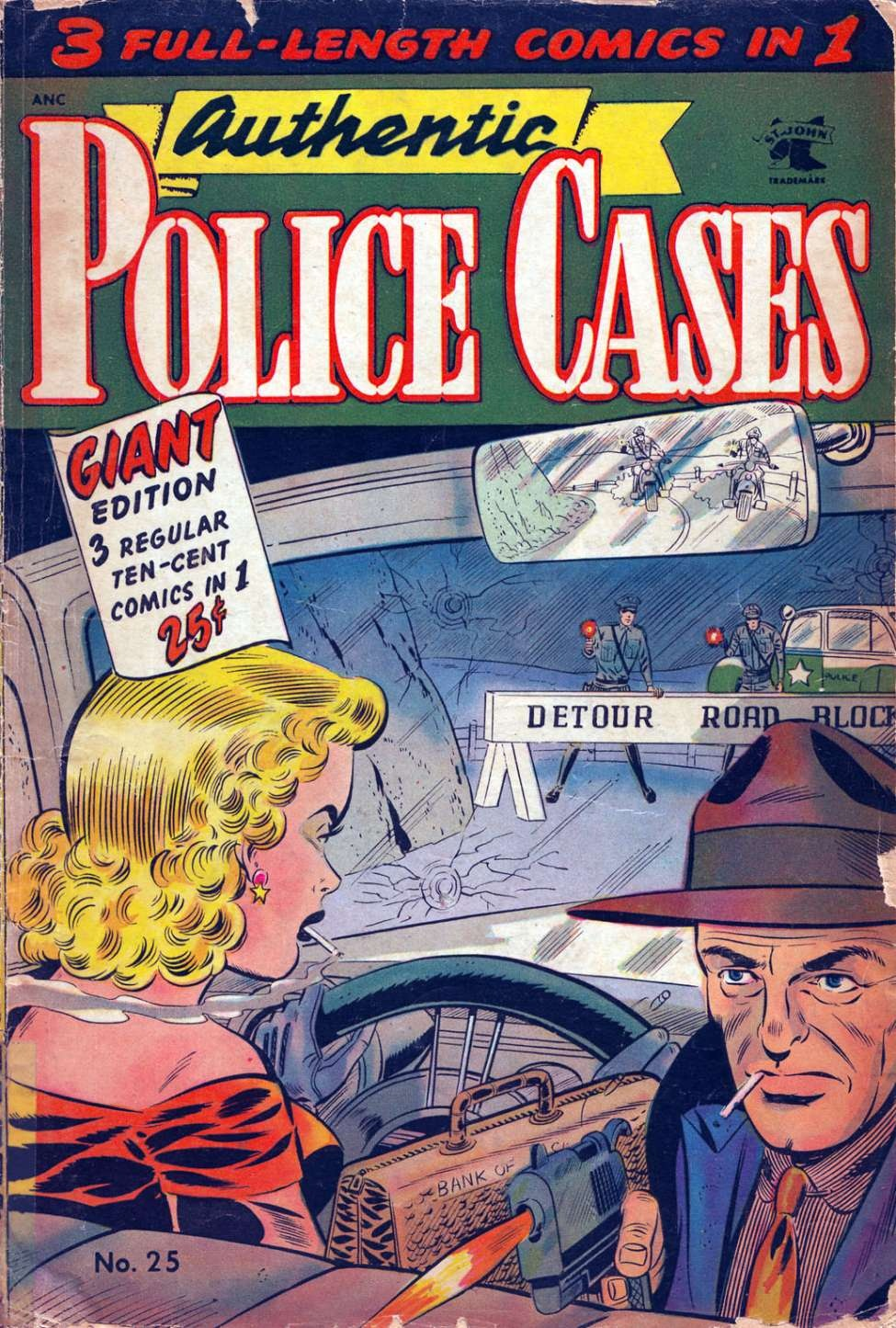
Authentic Police Cases #25, Jan 1953, reprinted The Case of the Winking Buddha

== As by Manning Lee Stokes ==
- The Wolf Howls “Murder” (Prize Mystery Novels #21, Phoenix Press, 1945)
- Green For A Grave (Phoenix Press, 1946)
- The Dying Room (Mercury Mystery #124, Phoenix Press, 1947)
- The Case of the Winking Buddha (St. John Publications, 1950), reprinted in Authentic Police Cases #25 (St. John, Jan 1953)
- The Lady Lost Her Head (Phoenix Press, 1950)
- The Crooked Circle (Graphic Mystery #40, 1951) (also released as “Too Many Murderers”, Graphic Mystery #98, 1955)
- Murder Can't Wait (Graphic Mystery #117, 1955)
- The Case of the Presidents' Heads (Arcadia House, 1956)
- The Case of the Judas Spoon (Arcadia House, 1957)
- Under Cover of Night (Dell Publishing Co. Inc., 1958)
- Triangle of Sin (Beacon, 1959)
- The Grave's in the Meadow (Dell Publishing Co. Inc., 1961) (as Un trou dans l'herbe, Serie Noire, 1967)
- Girl on a Couch (Beacon, 1961)
- Grand Prix (Avon Paperback, 1967)
- Winning (Signet Books, 1969)
- The Evangelist (Pyramid Books, 1974)
- Corporate Hooker, Inc (Pocket Books, 1975)

=== As by Nick Carter - Nick Carter-Killmaster Series ===
This is a series of spy adventures published from 1964 until 1990. For a complete list, see Nick Carter-Killmaster. The publisher name also evolved from Award Books to Ace Books and Jove Books.

No actual author is credited for the books, with the Nick Carter name being used as a house pseudonym. Volumes varied between first person and third person narrative. Authors known to have contributed entries in the series are Michael Avallone, Valerie Moolman, Manning Lee Stokes and Martin Cruz Smith.

Publisher: Award Books

- Run, Spy, Run (1964), #1
- The China Doll (1968), #2
- The Eyes of the Tiger (1965), #9
- Istanbul (1965), #10
- Web of Spies (1966), #11
- Spy Castle (Tandem, 1966), #12
- Dragon Flame (1966), #14
- The Golden Serpent (1967), #20
- Mission to Venice (1967), #21
- Double Identity (1967), #22
- The Devil's Cockpit (1967), #23
- A Korean Tiger (1967), #26
- Assignment: Israel (1967), #27
- The Red Guard (1967), #28
- The Filthy Five (1967), #29
- Macao (1968), #31
- Temple of Fear (1968), #35
- The Red Rays (1969), #41
- The Cobra Kill (1969), #47
- The Black Death (1970), #56

=== As by Paul Edwards - John Eagle “Expeditor” Series ===
Publisher: Pyramid Books

- Needles of Death (1973), #1
- The Brain Scavengers (1973), #2
- Valley of Vultures (1973), #5
- The Green Goddess (1975), #12
- Silverskull (1975), #14

=== As by Jeffrey Lord - Series Richard Blade ===
- The Bronze Axe (1969), #1
- The Jade Warrior (1969), #2
- Jewel of Tharn (1969), #3
- Slave of Sarma (1970), #4
- Liberator of Jedd (1971), #5
- Monster of the Maze (1973), #6
- Pearl of Patmos (1973), #7
- Undying World (1973), #8

=== As by Bernice Ludwell ===
Published by Arcadia House

- Love Without Armor (1955)
- Haunted Spring (1956)
- Moon of Hope (1956)
- Cordelia (1958)

=== As by March Marlowe ===
Published by Arcadia House

- FBI Girl (1959)

=== As by Ken Stanton - The Aquanauts Series ===
Publisher: Manor Books, Inc

- Cold Blue Death (1970), #1
- Ten Seconds To Zero (1970), #2
- Seek, Strike And Destroy (1970), #3
- Sargasso Secret (1971), #4
- Stalkers Of The Sea (1972), #5
- Whirlwind Beneath The Sea (1972), #6
- Operation Deep Six (1972), #7
- Operation Steelfish (1972), #8
- Evil Cargo (1973), #9
- Operation Sea Monster (1974), #10
- Operation Mermaid (1974), #11

=== As by Kermit Welles ===
- Sin Preferred (Cameo Books No. 307, Detective House, Inc., New York, 1951)
- Gambler's Girl (Venus Books, 1951)
- She Had What It Takes (Venus Books #128, Star Guidance Inc., New York, 1951)
- Wild Sister (Venus Books, 1951)
- Pleasure Bound (Cameo Books No. 310, Detective House, Inc., New York, 1952)
- See No Evil (Original Novels Foundation, 1952)
- Beloved Enemy (Star Books, Sydney, Australia, 1954)
- Reckless (Carnival, 1954)
- Shanty Boat Girl (Cameo Books No. 338, Detective House, Inc., New York, 1954) (Reprint of Sin Preferred)
- Blood on Boot Hill (Arcadia, 1958)
- Reformatory Women (Bedside Books, Inc., 1959)
- Wild Wanton (Brandon Books, 1959)
- Strange Love (English Romance Library, No. 80)
- Les soeurs rivales (Ferenczi, 1956) - French.

=== As by Kirk Westley ===
- The Innocent Wanton (Venus Books, 1952) (Reprint of Wild Sister)
- Shanty Boat Girl (Cameo Books No. 361, Detective House, Inc., New York, 1954) (Reprint of Sin Preferred) (Berkley Books, 1959)
- Man-Chaser (Carnival Books, 1954) (Reprint of Pleasure Bound)
- The Velvet Trap (McFadden-Bartell Corp., 1971)

=== As by Ford Worth ===
- Pilgrim's Pistols (Phoenix, 1946)
- Rustler's Warning (Phoenix Press, 1951)

=== As by Helen Sayle ===
- The Blue Smock (Arcadia, 1958)

== Other information ==
- Stokes has had several novels published by two different titles and two different pseudonyms, e.g.

Pleasure Bound (Kermit Welles) = Man-Chaser (Kirk Westley)
Sin Preferred (Kermit Welles) = Shanty Boat Girl (Kirk Westley)
Wild Sister (Kermit Welles) = The Innocent Wanton (Kirk Westley)

- Other sources claim that Stokes has also published using the pseudonym “Lee Manning” although this cannot be corroborated.
- The pseudonym "March Marlowe" is similar to his wife's maiden name (March Marlow).
- The major character of the series “The Aquanauts” is named William Martin. Stokes used the same name for a different character for the Nick Carter novel Double Identity.
- In the Nick Carter novel Dragon Flame Stokes introduces the character “Bob Ludwell” using of one of his own pseudonyms “B (Bernice) Ludwell”.
- For the Nick Carter novels, Stokes first introduces and subsequently sustains the character of Della Stokes - the secretary of Carter's boss, David Hawk.
- For the Nick Carter novel Macao, Stokes uses his own first name as Carter's cover name (Frank Manning).
