= Richard Blade (series) =

Adult fantasy pulp novel series

Richard Blade is an adult fantasy paperback novel series produced by American publisher Pinnacle Books between 1969 and 1984. The 37 books of the series were written by Roland J. Green, Ray Nelson, and Manning Lee Stokes, all using the pseudonym Jeffrey Lord.

The novels were also released as audio books, and as trilogy sets, each set having edited versions of three novels on six cassettes (running nine hours, or approximately three hours per novel), and later on CDs (one per book, three per trilogy set), with the name "Richard Blade Journeys". These were released as Americana Audiobooks by Americana Publishing in English.

== Plot ==
The novels were a series of fantasy adventures featuring the titular character (special agent Richard Blade of the British intelligence agency "MI6A"), who was teleported into a random alternate dimension at the beginning of each novel and forced to rely on his wits and strength. During the story, he would have explicitly described sexual encounters with beautiful women (both in England and in the alternate dimensions), and would usually return from his adventure with some item, or bit of knowledge useful to Britain (the ostensible reason for his being sent). All of the stories are set in England (at least at the beginning and end, with Blade's being teleported to some other dimension for the bulk of each tale). The series was translated into several languages, including Russian, Swedish, French, German, and Greek.

== Books of the series ==
Sources:

1. The Bronze Axe (1969) (Manning Lee Stokes) ISBN 978-0-523-00201-9
2. The Jade Warrior (1969) (Manning Lee Stokes) ISBN 0-523-00202-5
3. Jewel of Tharn (1969) (Manning Lee Stokes) ISBN 978-0-523-00203-3
4. Slave of Sarma (1970) (Manning Lee Stokes) ISBN 978-0-523-00204-0
5. Liberator of Jedd (1971) (Manning Lee Stokes) ISBN 978-0-523-00205-7
6. Monster of the Maze (1973) (Manning Lee Stokes) ISBN 978-0-523-00206-4
7. Pearl of Patmos (1973) (Manning Lee Stokes) ISBN 978-0-523-00207-1
8. Undying World (1973) (Manning Lee Stokes) ISBN 978-0-523-00208-8
9. Kingdom of Royth (1974) (Roland J. Green) ISBN 0-523-00295-5
10. Ice Dragon (1974) (Roland J. Green) ISBN 0-523-00768-X
11. Dimension of Dreams (1974) (Roland J. Green) ISBN 0-523-00474-5
12. King of Zunga (1975) (Roland J. Green) ISBN 0-523-00523-7
13. The Golden Steed (1975) (Roland J. Green) ISBN 0-523-00559-8
14. The Temples of Ayocan (1975) (Roland J. Green) ISBN 0-523-00623-3
15. The Towers of Melnon (1975) (Roland J. Green) ISBN 0-523-00688-8
16. The Crystal Seas (1975) (Roland J. Green) ISBN 0-523-00780-9
17. The Mountains of Brega (1976) (Roland J. Green) ISBN 0-523-40790-4
18. Warlords Of Gaikon (1976) (Roland J. Green) ISBN 0-523-00822-8
19. Looters of Tharn (1976) (Roland J. Green) ISBN 0-523-00855-4
20. Guardians Of The Coral Throne (1976) (Roland J. Green) ISBN 0-523-00881-3
21. Champion of the Gods (1976) (Roland J. Green) ISBN 0-523-00949-6
22. The Forests of Gleor (1976) (Roland J. Green) ISBN 0-523-00993-3
23. Empire of Blood (1977) (Roland J. Green) ISBN 978-0-523-40018-1
24. The Dragons of Englor (1977) (Roland J. Green) ISBN 978-0-523-40042-6
25. The Torian Pearls (1977) (Roland J. Green) ISBN 978-0-523-40111-9
26. City of the Living Dead (1978) (Roland J. Green) ISBN 0-523-40193-0
27. Master of the Hashomi (1978) (Roland J. Green) ISBN 0-523-40205-8
28. Wizard of Rentoro (1978) (Roland J. Green) ISBN 0-523-40206-6
29. Treasure of the Stars (1978) (Roland J. Green) ISBN 0-523-40207-4
30. Dimension of Horror (1979) (Ray Faraday Nelson) ISBN 0-523-40208-2
31. Gladiators of Hapanu (1979) (Roland J. Green) ISBN 0-523-40648-7
32. Pirates Of Gohar (1979) (Roland J. Green) ISBN 0-523-40679-7
33. Killer Plants Of Binnark (1980) (Roland J. Green) ISBN 0-523-40852-8
34. The Ruins of Kaldac (1981) (Roland J. Green) ISBN 0-523-41208-8
35. The Lords of the Crimson River (1981) (Roland J. Green) ISBN 0-523-41209-6
36. Return to Kaldak (1983) (Roland J. Green) ISBN 0-523-41210-X
37. Warriors of Latan (1984) (Roland J. Green) ISBN 0-523-41211-8

== Russian and French editions ==
During the early 1990s the Russian publishers could secure the rights only to the first six books of the series, and asked the translator, Mikhail Akhmanov, to write the further adventures of Richard Blade. Together with then young science fiction author Nick Perumov and others, Akhmanov composed more than sixteen sequels to the adventures of Richard Blade, and then, after creating Russian sequels to the saga of Conan, created numerous original characters and plots. Like the Conan sequels, the Russian Richard Blade sequels are not available in English. Akhmanov is currently the author of more than fifty fantasy and science fiction novels.

Blade was released in France in 1974, presented by Gérard de Villiers. The first thirty-seven volumes were France-Marie Watkins translations of the original novels. After that Richard D. Nolane wrote a total of 43 novels, first anonymously, then using his real name of Olivier Raynaud. The series had 206 titles in August 2012, with The Secret of the Winged Lions marking the end of the series.

The French authors since December 2007 have been Arnaud Dalrune, Patrick Eris, then Nemo Sandman from 2010. The series has also been authored by recognized authors like Nadine Monfils (author of Commissioner Léon) for Blade #174 The Curse Of Shadows 4 in 2007.

The cover illustrations for the French edition were from Loris Kalafat until his death in 2007; since Blade #180 The Country on the Other Side of the War, the illustrations were by Nemo Sandman, who was also the author of Blade #195 - The Empire of Tesla and Blade #196 - The Shadow of the Horde, before continuing jointly with Patrick Eris from Blade #198 on.

Here is the complete list of Richard Blade authors from 1970 to 2010:

- Manning Lee Stokes
- Roland Green
- Lyle Kenyon Engel
- Ray Faraday Nelson
- Richard D. Nolane
- Christian Mantey
- Arnaud Dalrune
- Yves Cheraqui
- Gerald Moreau
- Paul Couturiau
- Olga Tormes
- Amelina Defontaine
- Didier Le Gais
- Yves Bulteau
- Raymond Audemard
- Nadine Monfils
- Frederic Szczepaniak
- Patrick Eris
- Nemo Sandman

2007 died Loris Kalafat, its early illustrator, to whom tribute was paid in episode 179. His replacement was Nemo Sandman, director of music videos. That same year, Yves Chéraqui withdrew from the series. Patrick Eris and Arnaud Dalrune began writing for the series. In 2010, Nemo became illustrator and author.
