= The Eyes of the Tiger =

1965 novel by Manning Lee Stokes

First edition

The Eyes of the Tiger is the ninth novel in the long-running Nick Carter-Killmaster series of spy novels. Carter is a US secret agent, code-named N-3, with the rank of Killmaster. He works for AXE – a secret arm of the US intelligence services.

== Publishing history ==
The book was first published in September 1965 (Number A152F) by Award Books part of the Beacon-Signal division of Universal Publishing and Distributing Corporation (New York, USA), part of the Conde Nast Publications Inc. The novel was written by Manning Lee Stokes.

This novel was originally written in the third-person narrative style. However, since at least 1973, later editions of this novel were rewritten in first-person narrative style.

== Plot summary ==
The story is set in September 1965. Carter is in Geneva, Switzerland on Mission Tiger – a plan to steal a large gold and ruby statue of a tiger from Hermann Göring’s private Swiss bank vault. Former SS General Max Rader and Imperial Japanese Army Colonel Shikoku Hondo are also on their way to steal the tiger. The vault has been locked using a French key – a device that requires two matching key components to be inserted together – one half of which is kept by Rader and Hondo, respectively. Baroness Elspeth von Stadt – a West German intelligence agent – and the only person able to identify Max Rader after his recent plastic surgery – is assigned by AXE chief Mr. Hawk to help Carter. The Baroness claims to hate Rader as he executed her German army officer father following an attempt to assassinate Adolf Hitler during World War II.

Carter fights with Hondo and recovers his half of the French key. Hondo is injured and is imprisoned by Rader while Carter and the Baroness take shelter at the isolated Villa Limbo on an island in Lake Geneva. The housekeeper, Osman, an employee of Rader, tries to kill Carter but is killed in the attempt. Carter hides the body and he and the Baroness flee to Geneva. To draw Rader out into the open, Carter allows the Baroness to be kidnapped by Rader's men. Rader contacts Carter to make a deal – the Baroness for Hondo's half of the French key. Carter agrees and is told to wait at the Villa Limbo for further instructions.

Hondo escapes from Rader and lies in wait for Carter at Villa Limbo. Before Hondo can retrieve his half of the French key he is killed by Rader's men. Carter is summoned to Rader's castle to continue negotiations. The Baroness is tortured by Rader's men in the castle dungeons to force Carter to produce the key. Carter manages to release the Baroness and pursues Rader through the labyrinth of tunnels beneath the castle. Rader is cornered and Carter shoots him dead. Rader has hidden his half of the French key in the scar tissue beneath a dueling scar on his face. Carter cuts it out with Hugo - his stiletto.

After the statue is safely recovered Carter discovers that the Baroness was Rader's mistress and former Hitler Youth member and was responsible for denouncing her own father to the Nazis. Carter gives her a bullet to kill herself with and a head start before reporting her to the authorities. The Baroness escapes to Paris and kills herself.

Carter discovers that hidden inside the tiger statue is a list of the names of German children expected to launch the future Fourth Reich using money and valuables hidden in 20 sunken German submarines concealed in various locations around the world. Hawk informs Carter that the children will be watched as they grow up and the sunken submarines and their contents recovered.

== Main characters ==
- Nick Carter (agent N-3, AXE; posing as Rubli Kurz, Frank Manning)
- Mr Hawk (Carter's boss, head of AXE)
- Baroness Elspeth von Stadt (West German intelligence agent, Rader's former mistress)
- Max Rader (former Schutzstaffel (SS) General)
- Shikoku Hondo (former Imperial Japanese Army Colonel)
- Osman (servant at Villa Limbo, employee of Max Rader)
- Mignon Franchette (housekeeper, Villa Limbo)
- Mr. Poindexter (head of AXE Special Effects and Editing)
