= Valt the Wonder Deer =

2016 Chinese–American animated television series

- The main characters as they appear in the first two seasons.
- Mandarin: 鹿精灵 (season 1) 鹿精灵之寻找兵马俑 (season 2) 鹿精灵之瓷瓶山的秘密 (season 3)
- Genre: Action; Adventure; Comedy
- Developed by: Corey Powell; Ann Austen; Ron Myrick
- Directed by: Scott Heming; Dan Fausett
- Creative director: Ron Myrick
- Voices of: Ogie Banks; Benjamin Diskin; Matthew Christo; Tara Sands; Lyra Blake; Christopher Swindle; Colleen O'Shaughnessey; Mick Wingert; Misty Lee; Michael Johnston
- Composer: Scott Healy
- Country of origin: China
- Original language: English
- No. of seasons: 3
- No. of episodes: 156 (list of episodes)

Production
- Executive producers: John Andrews; J. William Kim; Dania Zhou
- Running time: 11 minutes (seasons 1; 3); 13 minutes (season 2)
- Production company: DreamEast Pictures

Original release
- Network: Tencent Video
- Release: December 31, 2016 – November 12, 2025

Valt the Wonder Deer (Deer Elf in Mandarin Chinese), and the subsequent seasons, The Quest for the Clay Guardians (season 2), andThe Legend of Porcelain Mountain in (season 3) is an animated television series that was released to Tencent Video in China on December 31, 2016. The series is produced by DreamEast Pictures and is distributed worldwide by Jetpack Distribution.

The first season premiered in 2017, second season premiered October 22, 2018, and ended November 26, and the third season featuring new anthropomorphic and angular designs for the characters premiered August 8, 2025, and ended November 12.

== Plot ==
=== Season 1 ===
Valt the Wonder Deer follows the adventures of Valt, a wonder deer and his five friends as they journey to obtain special powers granted by the Five Magical Elements, as well as rescue his trapped parents, the Deer King and Queen, from the evil overlords of the Land of Metal.

=== Season 2 ===
After peace and harmony has been restored to the Five Lands, Valt starts to miss his friends even though they're a portal away from him. His vacation however is cut short by more monsters suddenly arriving called the Nanomites; dark, flying swarm of bugs that can turn anything into an enemy. Valt reassembles the guardians to protect the Five Lands, but unbeknownst to him, Da-Ming and his bride are controlling the bugs, and they want to regain their throne.

=== Season 3 ===
Valt receives his father's powers and becomes the Protector of the Five Lands. He is then tricked by Da-Ming into opening the gate to Porcelain Mountain and unleashes a great evil. While trying to battle a Shadow Monster, he realizes his powers are gone, and he has no memory of unleashing that evil.

== Characters ==
=== Main ===
==== Valt ====
Voiced by: Ogie Banks (English, seasons 1 and 2), Michael Johnston (English, season 3); Cao Xupeng (曹旭鹏) (Chinese, season 1), Li Jing (李靖) (Chinese, season 2), Du Guangyi (杜光祎) (Chinese, season 3)

Valt (迪尔, Dí'ěr) is the main protagonist. A Wonder Deer from the Land of Wood.

==== Cobalt ====
Voiced by: Benjamin Diskin (English, season 1), Mick Wingert (English, seasons 2 and 3); Wang Chenguang (王晨光) (Chinese, season 1), Chen Qigang (陈启刚) (Chinese, season 2), Xu Gang (徐刚) (Chinese, season 3)

Cobalt (蓝宝, Lánbǎo) is a blue monkey and Valt's best friend.

==== Kem ====
Voiced by: Matthew Christo (English, seasons 1 and 2), Ted Sroka (English, season 3); Yang Mo (杨默) (Chinese, season 1), Wen Jingyuan (文靖渊) (Chinese, season 2), Zhou Jianuo (周佳诺) (Chinese, baby form, season 2), Zhou Nanfei (周南飞) (Chinese, season 3)

Kem (芥末, Jièmò) is a benevolent taotie from the Land of Metal.

==== Trika ====
Voiced by: Tara Sands (English); Zhang Xinyu (张馨予) (Note: no relation to the actress and model Zhang Xinyu (also known as Viann Zhang) born March 28, 1987, despite sharing the exact same name spelling in Chinese. The voice actress who provided the Chinese season 1 dub voice of Trika was born in May 15, 1987) (Chinese, season 1), Zhang Kang (张抗) (Chinese, season 2), Yan Lizhen (严丽祯) (Chinese, season 3)

Trika (喵妹, Miāomèi) is a yellow cat from the Land of Earth.

==== Alia ====
Voiced by: Lyra Blake (English); Wang Jinghong (王晶弘) (Chinese, season 1), Zhang Yan (张琰) (Chinese, season 2), Luo Yuting (罗玉婷) (Chinese, season 3)

Alia (丽娅, Lìyà) is an orange fire bird from the Land of Fire.

==== Yark ====
Voiced by: Matthew Christo (English); Zhao Mingzhou (赵铭洲) (Chinese, season 1), Guo Hao (郭号) (Chinese, season 2)

Yark (壕哥, Háogē) is an ice-snorting yak from the Land of Water.

==== Valanteen ====
Voiced by: Colleen O'Shaughnessey (English); Mo Yanming (莫颜铭) (Chinese, season 2)

Valanteen (如意, Rúyì) is a girl Wonder Deer from the Land of Water.

==== Tao ====
Voiced by: Colleen O'Shaughnessey (English)

Tao (陶, Táo) is a boy made out of clay who is a member of a group of ancient clay guardians.

==== Da-Ming ====
Voiced by: Christopher Swindle (English); Feng Sheng [zh] (冯盛) (Chinese, season 1), Zhang Zhankun (张占坤) (Chinese, season 2), Zhao Guoqing (赵国卿) (Chinese, season 3)

Da-Ming (达大王, Dádàwáng) (Note: In the Chinese dubbed version, Da-Ming goes by 达大王 (Dádàwáng, lit. "great king Da"), while Mungo inherited a variant of Da-Ming's English name in a mix-up of the Chinese translation process) is an evil short green taotie, and the main villain of the series.

==== Mungo ====
Voiced by: Christopher Swindle (English); Chen Zhao (陈昭) (Chinese, season 1), Yang Yang (杨扬) (Chinese, season 2), Jia Qiu (贾邱) (Chinese, season 3)

Mungo (王大明, Wángdàmíng) is an evil large tall purple taotie. He is Da-Ming's nephew and assistant.

==== Drusilla ====
Voiced by Beth Payne (English, season 1), Misty Lee (English, season 2); A Bu (阿步) (Chinese, season 2)

Drusilla (达女王, Dánǚwáng) is an evil female taotie and Da-Ming's wife.

==== Urgon ====
Voiced by Benjamin Diskin (English); Hu Qian (胡谦) (Chinese, season 3)

Urgon (乌尔刚, Wū'ěrgāng) is Valt's father.

==== Reyna ====
Voiced by Tara Sands (English); Fan Churong (范楚绒) (Chinese, season 3)

Reyna (蕾娜, Lěinà) is Valt's mother.

== Episodes ==
Season	Episodes	Originally released	
Season	Episodes	First released	Last released
1	52	December 31, 2016	February 19, 2017
2	52	October 22, 2018	November 26, 2018
3	52	August 8, 2025	November 12, 2025

== Broadcast ==
The first 26 episodes of Valt the Wonder Deer were released on the streaming service Tencent Video in China on December 31, 2016, which garnered over 9 million views in its first two weeks. The second half of the first season was released on February 19, 2017.

In the United Kingdom, the English dub of the series was broadcast on Propeller TV for one season around June 2017. The English dub was released onto Jetpack Distribution's YouTube channel on August 24, 2019, but it was later taken down.

The series is now streaming on Tubi and is divided into 9 one hour episodes.

On July 4, 2025, a set of official Rednote, Weibo and Douyin profiles collectively named Deer Elf Nostalgia (Note: Unofficial English translated title) (鹿精灵回忆杀, Lù Jīnglíng Huíyìshā) were opened. The first posts were made on August 4, 2025, uploading videos teasing the release of episodes from the Valt the Wonder Deer season 3 reboot through the profile. The Mandarin Chinese dub of the first two episodes of that season were then posted on August 8, 2025, with further episodes being posted to those three profiles on a semiweekly basis every Monday and Wednesday at a rate of two episodes per day, (Note: Exceptions were occasionally made to this schedule when it came to posting the Mandarin Chinese dub to the Deer Elf Nostalgia accounts. The August 8 premiere landed on a Friday, presumably chosen due to the lucky connotations of the number eight in Chinese. Episodes 17 and 18 were posted on Thursday September 4, due to the previous day's 2025 China Victory Day Parade landing on a Wednesday and therefore conflicting with the usual schedule. Wednesday October 1, Monday October 6, and Wednesday October 8 were skipped over in a row from the posting schedule, due to the combined National Day and Mid-Autumn Festival public holidays that year, with regular posts resuming on Monday October 13 with episodes 33 and 34.) (Note: For unknown reasons, the Mandarin Chinese dub of season 3 episode 6 is unavailable on Rednote, however it is still viewable on Douyin and Weibo) up until the final two episodes were posted on November 12, 2025. On December 3, 2025, the Deer Elf Nostalgia social media profiles started posting the original English version of season 3 under the same biweekly schedule (Note: The Deer Elf Nostalgia accounts all took a brief hiatus from posting after the English versions of episodes 37 and 38 were posted on Wednesday February 4, 2026, in part due to a combination of the 2026 Winter Olympics and the Chinese New Year public holiday. That hiatus ended over three weeks later, when a chapter of a spinoff comic was posted on Friday February 27, and English episodes resumed its regular posting schedule starting with episodes 39 and 40 on Monday March 2.), up until the final two episodes of that version were uploaded on March 23, 2026.. Some of the English episode uploads are missing background music and sound effects, but with voice lines and some music numbers intact, an issue strangely not present in the Chinese dub. It is currently unknown if, when, or where the English version will be officially released outside of China or outside of these three Chinese social media websites.

== Musical ==
On May 1, 2019, a Chinese musical for the series, Deer Elf: In Search of the Rainbow Bridge (鹿精灵之寻找彩虹桥, Lù Jīnglíng zhī xúnzhǎo cǎihóng qiáo) premiered in the Beijing China Puppet Theater.

== See also ==
- A Deer of Nine Colors, an ancient Chinese tale from the Jataka tales on which this animated series takes influence from, as well as its 1981 animated film adaptation. The story features a Nine-Colored Deer character similar to that shown in this animated series.
