= A Korean Tiger =

1967 novel by Manning Lee Stokes

A Korean Tiger is the 26th novel in the long-running Nick Carter-Killmaster series of spy novels. Carter is a US secret agent, code-named N-3, with the rank of Killmaster. He works for AXE – a secret arm of the US intelligence services.

== Publishing history ==
The book was first published in 1967 (Number A248X) by Award Books part of the Beacon-Signal division of Universal Publishing and Distributing Corporation (New York, USA), part of the Conde Nast Publications Inc. The novel was written by Manning Lee Stokes. Copyright was registered on 14 August 1967.

== Plot summary ==
The novel is set in June 1966.

Carter is recuperating at his private lodge in Indiana when he is summoned by AXE chief, David Hawk, to uncover a traitor within the organization.

Hawk reveals that Raymond Lee Bennett – a minor civil servant working in AXE – has apparently murdered his wife and disappeared only a few weeks after his retirement. His wife's body was discovered in a secret basement room in their house. Further background checks reveals that Bennett has a photographic memory and is capable of recalling every classified document he has had access to in the last 30 years. AXE fears that Russian and Chinese intelligence agencies also intend to capture Bennett to exploit his knowledge.

The FBI traces Bennett to Cologne. Carter follows with orders to get Bennett dead or alive. He tracks Bennett to the Hotel Dom. Carter breaks into Bennett's room intending to kill him. Instead he discovers the bodies of a Chinese and Russian agent. Bennett and his female companion have escaped. Carter traces their steps over the rooftops of buildings adjacent to the hotel and discovers the body of his German AXE contact. Carter allows himself to be captured by three Russian agents on his tail. Carter is tortured in a warehouse by Colonel Zoe Kalinski – a sadistic MGB agent. She is only interested in finding Bennett and the Yellow Widow – a known Chinese agent and the woman with whom Bennett has escaped. Under duress, Carter gives a false location for the Yellow Widow's hideout. Carter escapes from the Russian agents and attempts to pick up the trail of Bennett and the Yellow Widow.

Carter suspects that the Yellow Widow and Bennett will try to enter China through North Korea. AXE agents stake out the ports of South Korea. Carter picks up the trail again in Pusan where a disguised Bennett and Yellow Widow intend to take the train to Seoul. Zoe Kalinski and her Russian colleagues have followed Carter to Pusan. They board the train and capture Carter. Carter escapes and immediately attempts to capture the Yellow Widow and Bennett in their train compartment. The train is halted by bandits loyal to the Yellow Widow. The Yellow Widow and Bennett escape and run down the tracks. The Yellow Widow is killed in crossfire and Bennett falls down the embankment. Carter captures him and together they head into the Korean hinterland.

They stumble upon the bandits' secret hideout. Carter steals some weapons and rigs booby traps to surprise the bandits when they return from besieging the train. Carter sets the camp on fire which attracts the attention of Jimmy Kim and Pok who have been searching the environs of the train for him in a spotter plane. The plane crash-lands. While Carter goes to help the crew Bennett escapes but is attacked and killed by a tiger. Carter, Kim and Pok walk back to the nearest town.

== Main characters ==
- Nick Carter – agent N-3, AXE
- David Hawk – head of AXE; Carter's boss,
- Raymond Lee Bennett – retired former AXE clerk
- Zoe Kalinski – Colonel, MGB
- Yellow Widow – aka Madame Hsu Tzu Tsai; real name Chung; half-Korean, half-Chinese spy
- Jimmy Kim – AXE agent, South Korea
- Pok – Korean orphan; Kim's assistant
