= Dragon Flame =

1966 novel by Manning Lee Stokes

Dragon Flame is the 14th novel in the Nick Carter-Killmaster series of spy novels. Carter is a US secret agent, code-named N-3, with the rank of Killmaster. He works for AXE – a secret arm of the US intelligence services.

== Publishing history ==
The book was first published in May 1966 (Number A173F) by Award Books part of the Beacon-Signal division of Universal Publishing and Distributing Corporation (New York, USA), part of the Conde Nast Publications Inc. The novel was written by Manning Lee Stokes. Copyright was registered on 1 June 1966.

== Plot summary ==
The novel is set in December 1965. Carter is vacationing in a borrowed yacht in Hong Kong disguised as playboy, Clark Harrington. He is contacted by friend and CIA agent, Bob Ludwell. Ludwell confides in Carter that he is leaving Hong Kong that night to cross into China on an undisclosed mission and that he does not expect to survive. Ludwell has clearly lost his nerve and hands Carter an envelope with instructions to give it to his wife and children if he does not return in a week.

Carter is followed indicating that he has been connected with Ludwell. Carter murders the tail and returns to his yacht anchored in Victoria Harbour where he finds that his cabin boy has been murdered in retaliation. A note pinned to the boy’s body warns Carter to leave Hong Kong immediately or face the consequences from the Society of the Red Tiger. A Marine Police cutter arrives and Carter is informed that Ludwell was murdered before he had the chance to leave Hong Kong.

It is apparent to the police that Ludwell was killed and dismembered on the orders of James (Jim) Pok – leader of the Red Tiger tong. Carter arranges to undertake Ludwell's mission. Carter's yacht is being watched by the Tiger tong. Carter swims ashore helped by Fan Su – Ludwell's contact in China who has come to Hong Kong to discover what has happened to him. Fan Su is an anti-communist guerilla fighter based in Hong Kong. She was working with Ludwell to foment an anti-communist revolution in China. She has made contact with a Chinese army general wishing to defect. Ludwell's secret mission was to go to China and escort the general into Hong Kong and thence to the US.

The general has been severely wounded and is holed up in a Buddhist temple 5–10 miles from the Hong Kong-China border. Fan Su helps Carter enter China in a coffin disguised as the repatriated corpse of her dead relative. Carter and Fan Su reach the temple as a company of Chinese soldiers begin to search the nearby countryside for the missing general. Under the cover of night, Carter, Fan Su and the general elude the search parties, steal a tank and crash through the border into Hong Kong.

The general survives and is sent to the US to recover. Jim Pok meets Carter and tries to bargain with him to hand over Fan Su to save face with his Chinese paymasters. Carter refuses and threatens to spread rumours among the underworld crime network that Pok has double-crossed the Chinese government – damaging Pok's reputation and putting his life at risk. Carter throws Pok over the side of his yacht and returns to the cabin to make love to Fan Su.

== Main characters ==
- Nick Carter (agent N-3, AXE; posing as Clark Harrington)
- Mr Hawk (Carter's boss, head of AXE)
- Bob Ludwell (CIA agent stationed in Hong Kong)
- Fan Su (Frances Suon) (anti-communist guerilla based in Hong Kong)
- Smythe (senior inspector, Hong Kong Police Force (Marine Region) aka Marine Police)
- James (Jim) Pok (leader of the Society of the Red Tiger, triad)
- Sung Yo Chan (general, Chinese General Staff)
- Swee Lo (old female friend of Carter; Jim Pok's lover)
- Miriam Hunt (Chair, World Rescue Organization)
