= List of Valt the Wonder Deer episodes =

Episodes of Chinese animated television series

Valt the Wonder Deer is an animated television series that was released to Tencent Video in China on December 31, 2016.

== Series overview ==
Season	Episodes	Originally released	
Season	Episodes	First released	Last released
1	52	December 31, 2016	February 19, 2017
2	52	October 22, 2018	November 26, 2018
3	52	August 8, 2025	November 12, 2025

== Episodes ==
=== Season 1 (2016–17) ===
This season is simply known as Valt the Wonder Deer (Chinese: 鹿精灵, pinyin: Lù Jīnglíng)

No.	Title	Directed by	Written by	Storyboard by	Original release date	English release date (Note: The first 36 episodes in this column refers to the episodes as they release on Jetpack Distribution's YouTube channel, not its original run in the UK on Propeller TV. The rest of this column refers to the episodes subsequent releases on other services such as Tubi)
1	"It Begins" "征程开始 (transl. The Journey Begins)"	Scott Heming	Corey Powell and Ann Austen	Joseph Chang	December 31, 2016	August 24, 2019
On his tenth birthday, Valt and his best friend Cobalt are attacked by the same taotie monster who kidnapped his parents years before. He escapes and meets Kem, a kindly taotie sent by his parents to be his guide from the Land of Metal and help him master his elemental powers.
2	"Unseen Danger" "牺牲的意思 (transl. The Meaning of Sacrifice)"	Dan Fausett and Scott Heming	Ann Austen	Dan Fausett and Patrick Archibald	December 31, 2016	August 31, 2019
Kem tells Valt about the portals taotie use to travel to between lands. Valt's curiosity to find a portal leads to Cobalt being captured by Mungo.
3	"Cuckoo for Mang Lo" "奇异的水果 (transl. Strange Fruits)"	Scott Heming	Allan Jacobsen	Shannon Eric Denton	December 31, 2016	September 7, 2019
Valt and his friends gather rare Mo Mang Lo fruit to eat at a harvest festival, but when Kem eats it he goes crazy for the stuff becoming disoriented and hostile.
4	"Valt Gets the Message" "森林传音 (transl. Forest Echoes)"	Scott Heming	Eric Lewald & Julia Lewald	Joseph Chang	December 31, 2016	September 14, 2019
Valt receives a message from his parents and tries to figure out what it means.
5	"Brains Over Brawn" "智取胜蛮力 (transl. Wisdom Triumphs Over Brute Force)"	Scott Heming	Daniel Bryan Franklin	Vic Dal Chale	December 31, 2016	September 21, 2019
Valt and his friends meet Trika the Healer, Valt's guide from the Land of Earth. She helps Cobalt with his wish to become stronger by giving him a healing herb that makes him bigger but also goofier.
6	"Ride the Rainbow" "乘坐彩虹 (transl. Riding a Rainbow)"	Scott Heming	Eric Lewald & Julia Lewald	Frank Paur	December 31, 2016	September 28, 2019
Valt learns about a special rainbow the Mo Lin fish use to migrate to the Land of Water. A stray fish gets left behind so he and his friends try to return her to the rainbow. They end up meeting Yark, Valt's guide from the Land of Water, who helps them when Mungo attacks.
7	"Map of the Unknown" "未知世界的地图 (transl. Map of an Unknown World)"	Scott Heming	Dan Franklin	T.J. Collins	December 31, 2016	October 5, 2019
Valt and his friends search an ancient shrine for a magic map of the Five Lands Road. Trika and Yark compete to see who can find the map first.
8	"Follow Alia" "火鸟丽娅 (transl. Fire Bird Alia)"	Scott Heming	Ann Austen and Eric Lewald & Julia Lewald	Larry Houston	December 31, 2016	October 12, 2019
Valt and his friends meet Alia, his guide from the Land of Fire, who offers to use her powers to teleport Valt to the other side of the wall surrounding the Land of Metal.
9	"Shadow of Fire" "火的影子 (transl. Shadow of Fire)"	Scott Heming	Obie Scott Wade	Joseph Chang	December 31, 2016	October 19, 2019
A solar flare causes Alia's flame to separate from her body leaving her cold and weak while her flame wreaks havoc in the Land of Wood.
10	"Kem Changes Everything" "芥末改变了一切 (transl. Kem Changes Everything)"	Scott Heming	Ann Austen	Patrick Archibald and Dan Fausett	December 31, 2016	October 26, 2019
Kem starts to feel useless when he realizes he has no special powers to teach Valt like the other guides. Meanwhile, Da-Ming fires Mungo and decides to go after Valt himself.
11	"The Infinity Bridge" "无限桥 (transl. Infinite Bridge)"	Scott Heming	Eric Lewald & Julia Lewald	Vincent Edwards	December 31, 2016	November 2, 2019
Valt and his friends plan to take a shortcut across the Land of Earth by taking a bridge over a massive canyon, but the bridge turns out to be a trap.
12	"Smooth Sailing" "一帆风顺 (transl. One Sail Follows the Wind)"	Dan Fausett and Scott Heming	Eric Lewald & Julia Lewald	Simon Estrada	December 31, 2016	November 9, 2019
Yark can't take being in the desert heat much longer without water, so Cobalt comes up with a plan to get them to the next city faster.
13	"City of Ghosts" "废城雅丹 (transl. Abandoned Town Yadan)"	Dan Fausett and Scott Heming	Allan Jacobsen	Joseph Chang	December 31, 2016	November 16, 2019
The group comes to a city supposedly inhabited by ghosts. This seems to be true when all of Valt's friends start disappearing.
14	"Light in the Darkness" "黑暗之光 (transl. Light of Darkness)"	Dan Fausett and Scott Heming	David McDermott	Llyn Hunter	December 31, 2016	November 23, 2019
Led by a magic firefly named Lina, Valt and Trika explore a cave to find more water.
15	"The Humble Flower" "了不起的花 (transl. Amazing Flower)"	Dan Fausett and Scott Heming	Rob Loos	T.J. Collins	December 31, 2016	November 30, 2019
Yark's fur is shedding so Trika leads the group to a secret oasis with a flower that can restore it.
16	"The Prophecy" "预言 (transl. Prophecy)"	Dan Fausett and Scott Heming	Daniel Bryan Franklin	Reggie Camargo	December 31, 2016	December 7, 2019
The ruins of an ancient kingdom contain a prophecy for Valt to find, but first he must get past the dragon cursed to destroy anyone who enters the city.
17	"Troubled Waters" "暗流涌动 (transl. Undercurrents are Surging)"	Dan Fausett and Scott Heming	Al Schwartz	Joseph Chang	December 31, 2016	December 14, 2019
Valt is unable to drink the water from the Crescent Moon Lake so he, Cobalt, and Trika, with help from Trika's uncle, travel to the bottom of the lake to find a chalice to help him drink.
18	"Over The Rainbow" "彩虹之上 (transl. Over the Rainbow)"	Dan Fausett and Scott Heming	Al Schwartz	Vincent Edwards	December 31, 2016	December 21, 2019
Valt travels to Rainbow Mountain alone to retrieve the stolen chalice. He runs into a figure called Dark Warrior who wants Valt to join him in conquering Da-Ming. When he refuses, Dark Warrior takes away Valt's powers.
19	"To Grandmother's House" "去奶奶家 (transl. Going to Grandmother's House)"	Dan Fausett and Scott Heming	Ann Austen	Simon Estrada	December 31, 2016	December 28, 2019
The gang travels to Trika's home village to ask for her grandmother's help in restoring Valt's powers only to find that the village has been taken over by Dark Warrior.
20	"Fire From Ice" "重获法力 (transl. Regaining Magic Power)"	Dan Fausett and Scott Heming	Ann Austen	Reggie Camargo	December 31, 2016	January 4, 2020
Valt and his friends travel to the Fortress of the Dark Warrior to reclaim the chalice and regain his powers once and for all.
21	"Dot Hacked" "神秘圆点 (transl. Mysterious Dots)"	Dan Fausett and Scott Heming	Dave McDermott	Joseph Chang	December 31, 2016	January 11, 2020
A giant wall of flames prevents the group from entering the Fire Bird Village, and the only way to get through is with the power of a Sun Gem.
22	"Mean Birds" "刁蛮的火鸟 (transl. Unruly Fire Birds)"	Dan Fausett and Scott Heming	Al Schwartz	Vincent Edwards	December 31, 2016	January 18, 2020
Alia takes Trika on a girls day out when they are interrupted by a trio of birds led by Jia who wants to leave Alia out of it.
23	"How to Eat Barbecued Worms" "龙之火焰 (transl. Dragon's Flame)"	Dan Fausett and Scott Heming	Dan Franklin	T.J. Collins	December 31, 2016	January 25, 2020
Yark accidentally extinguishes the sacred fire of the Jing Ling village with his ice breath, so Valt and the others search for a dragon to re-light the flame.
24	"Birdbrained" "命中注定 (transl. Predestined)"	Dan Fausett and Scott Heming	Rob Loos	Reggie Camargo	December 31, 2016	February 1, 2020
Valt tries to make Alia feel better after her feathers fall out while the others go on a hunt for a thousand-year-old egg.
25	"Alia Reborn" "丽娅重生 (transl. Alia's Rebirth)"	Dan Fausett and Scott Heming	Eric Lewald & Julia Lewald	Joseph Chang	December 31, 2016	February 8, 2020
Alia and Cobalt venture into a volcano to find a sun gem. When Da Ming causes the volcano to erupt, Alia risks her life to retrieve it.
26	"The Crystal Key" "晶石钥匙 (transl. Crystal Key)"	Dan Fausett and Scott Heming	Denise Downer	Vincent Edwards	December 31, 2016	February 15, 2020
Valt is given a magic crystal that enhances his teleporting powers enough to take him all the way to the Land of Metal where he tries to rescue his parents.
27	"Kem For A Day" "真假芥末 (transl. True or False Kem)"	Dan Fausett and Scott Heming	Daniel Franklin	T.J. Collins	February 19, 2017	February 22, 2020
Da Ming gives Mungo an elixir that disguises him as Kem so that he can sneak into the Land of Fire and hack the map.
28	"Return of the Snow Eagles" "雪雕归来 (transl. The Snow Eagles' Return)"	Dan Fausett and Scott Heming	Al Schwartz	Reggie Camargo	February 19, 2017	February 29, 2020
Valt and Alia take to the sky to retrieve a Sun Gem on a floating island inhabited by snow eagles.
29	"Forbidden Waters" "禁忌水域 (transl. Forbidden Waters)"	Dan Fausett and Scott Heming	Dave McDermott	Joseph Chang	February 19, 2017	March 7, 2020
Jia teams up with Mungo to lure Alia into a trap when Alia tries to teach Trika how to swim.
30	"The Last Sun Gem" "最后一块太阳宝石 (transl. The Final Sun Gem Piece)"	Dan Fausett and Scott Heming	Ann Austen	Vincent Edwards	February 19, 2017	March 14, 2020
Valt's parents, Urgon and Reyna, re-tell the story of how they were captured and betrayed to Mungo.
31	"Deer Wanted" "通缉小鹿 (transl. Wanted: Fawn)"	Dan Fausett and Scott Heming	Ann Austen	DT.J. Collins	February 19, 2017	March 21, 2020
Valt and friends enter the Land of Water where they realize there has been a drought and that Valt is wanted by the locals.
32	"Two Little Things" "两件小东西 (transl. Two Little Things)"	Dan Fausett and Scott Heming	Dan Franklin	Reggie Camargo	February 19, 2017	March 28, 2020
A snow monkey named Norba asks Valt and his friends to obtain two items for her in exchange for water. Meanwhile, Mungo teams up with Ming Ling to capture Valt.
33	"Yak Attack" "牦牛的游戏 (transl. Yak's Game)"	Dan Fausett and Scott Heming	Dan Franklin	Joseph Chang	February 19, 2017	April 4, 2020
Yark encounters other yaks for the first time when he discovers a village of them and learns how they normally live.
34	"Mind Over Ming" "达大王的思想球 (transl. Da-Ming's Thought Sphere)"	Dan Fausett and Scott Heming	Rob Loos	T.J. Collins	February 19, 2017	April 11, 2020
Da-Ming tries to use a spirit portal to enter Valt's mind, but accidentally enters the minds of his friends instead.
35	"Monkey Business" "雪猴子村庄 (transl. Snow Monkey Village)"	Dan Fausett and Scott Heming	Al Schwartz	Vincent Edwards	February 19, 2017	April 18, 2020
Valt and friends are captured and taken to the snow monkey village led by Princess Mirka. The village's sacred treasure causes Valt to feel uneasy and see things. The treasure turns out to be Valanteen, the girl wonder deer.
36	"Deer Oh Deer" "鹿姑娘 (transl. Deer Girl)"	Unknown	Unknown	TBA	February 19, 2017	May 2, 2020
Valanteen refuses to teach Valt her Land of Water powers due to him being the cause of the drought, but when Mirka gets captured by Mungo she has no choice but to ask him for help.
37	"Acts of Betrayal" "蓝宝的法力 (transl. Cobalt's Magic Power)"	Unknown	Unknown	TBA	February 19, 2017	2023
Cobalt gets annoyed when Valt chooses Valanteen's training style over his giving Da Ming a plan to turn Cobalt against his friend.
38	"The King's Tale" "国王的故事 (transl. King's Tale)"	Unknown	Unknown	TBA	February 19, 2017	2023
Da Ming explains the story of his wife and how he's doing this to protect his son in an attempt to get Urgon and Reyna to cooperate and give him more power.
39	"The Ice Storm Cometh" "裂云飞龙来袭 (transl. The Cloud-Splitting Flying Dragon Strikes)"	Unknown	Unknown	TBA	February 19, 2017	2023
40	"The Ice Storm Cometh" "裂云飞龙来袭 (transl. The Cloud-Splitting Flying Dragon Strikes)"	Unknown	Unknown	TBA	February 19, 2017	2023
Cobalt and Mirka accidentally portal themselves to the Land of Metal where they learn that Da Ming is sending an Ice Dragon to capture Valt and Valanteen. They return to warn them but are too late. Kem explains that the only way to defeat the dragon is with a storm more powerful than it. Valanteen shares her Land of Water powers with Valt allowing him to defeat the dragon before heading to the Land of Metal just as Queen Drusilla awakens.
41	"The Not So Great Escape" "不完美的逃亡 (transl. Imperfect Escape)"	Unknown	Unknown	TBA	February 19, 2017	2023
Taotie Queen Drusilla awakens and takes control over conquering the Five Lands from Da Ming. Valt and Valanteen search the castle to find his parents and escape. His friends build a hot air balloon to meet up with him.
42	"Furry Road" "狂野大赛 (transl. Wild Tournament)"	Unknown	Unknown	TBA	February 19, 2017	2023
Valt meets Zuo, a taotie who is part of a resistance against Da Ming who convinces him to compete in a race against a roughneck taotie named Url in order to get food for his parents.
43	"Undercover Da Ming" "卧底达大王 (transl. Undercover Da-Ming)"	Unknown	Unknown	TBA	February 19, 2017	2023
Da Ming goes undercover in order to search the city for his missing son, Prince Mek. He runs into Valt and Valanteen and tries to capture them.
44	"Friendly Fight" "友好的较量 (transl. Friendly Brawl)"	Unknown	Unknown	TBA	February 19, 2017	2023
Kem competes in a brawl event at the castle arena when Zuo is taken by Drusilla who shows an interest in him.
45	"Dark Temptations" "黑暗的诱惑 (transl. Temptation of Darkness)"	Unknown	Unknown	TBA	February 19, 2017	2023
Drusilla uses the spirit portal on Valanteen to lure Valt into a trap, but this causes Valanteen to be taken over by her dark metal powers.
46	"Air a Parent" "争夺传送门 (transl. Battle for the Portal)"	Unknown	Unknown	TBA	February 19, 2017	2023
The group plans to send Valt's parents back to the Land of Wood using Mungo's portal belt so they set up a distraction for him. Meanwhile, Kem goes to the castle following a lead about his parents being there.
47	"Those Ol' Taotie Blues" "芥末的身世 (transl. Kem's Origin)"	Unknown	Unknown	TBA	February 19, 2017	2023
Kem and Trika go into Kem's mind to learn about his past as Prince Mek. Meanwhile, Drusilla drains enough magic power out of Valanteen to make her powerful iron deer fully functional.
48	"Alia's Plight" "丽娅对吉雅 (transl. Alia vs. Jia)"	Unknown	Unknown	TBA	February 19, 2017	2023
The gang performs a raid on the castle to shut off an orb that's blocking the use of powers in the castle. Valt tries to save Valanteen from Drusilla, Cobalt and Yark face off with Da Ming and Mungo, and Alia goes one-on-one with Jia.
49	"King For a Day" "当一天国王 (transl. King for a Day)"	Unknown	Unknown	TBA	February 19, 2017	2023
Zuo leads Valt to ask the taotie resistance for help, only to find out that it's a trap. Meanwhile, Da Ming gives Kem the opportunity to live as a king and rule the Land of Metal for a day to convince him to join his side.
50	"Kem's Sacrifice" "芥末的牺牲 (transl. Kem's Sacrifice)"	Unknown	Unknown	TBA	February 19, 2017	2023
Drusilla drains Valt of his power to power up the Iron Deer so Cobalt and Yark plan an inside job to save him.
51	"The Queen Stands Alone" "孤立无援的女王 (transl. Isolated and Helpless Queen)"	Unknown	Unknown	TBA	February 19, 2017	2023
Valt calls upon the Nine Colored Deer to ask for help in unlocking his Land of Metal power when Drusilla attacks him with the Iron Deer. With Kem's Help he's able to take her powers away.
52	"Long Live The Kings" "最终的决战 (transl. Final Showdown)"	Unknown	Unknown	TBA	February 19, 2017	2023
The final battle for the Five Lands had begun! Realizing he can't win alone, Valt calls upon all his friends and allies to assist in the fight. In the middle of battle Valt unlocks his metal power and becomes a fully powered Wonder Deer able to defeat the king and Queen and restore balance to the Five Lands. Valt is named King of the Land of Wood and Kem is named King of the Land of Metal.

=== Season 2 (2018) ===
This season has been given the subtitle The Quest for the Clay Guardians (Chinese: 鹿精灵之寻找兵马俑, pinyin: Lù Jīnglíng zhī xúnzhǎo bīngmǎyǒng), and continues where the first season's ending left off. The characters have received a slight redesign in this season, and a new main character, a clay guardian soldier named Tao is introduced.

No. overall	No. in season	Title	Directed by	Written by	Storyboard by	Original release date	English release date
53	1	"Planting Chaos" "植树大典 (transl. Tree-Planting Ceremony)"	Unknown	Unknown	TBA	October 22, 2018	2023
Having restored peace and harmony and sending Da Ming and Drusilla to the Forgotten Island, Valt starts to miss his friends. During a tree ceremony to unite the Five Lands a tree turns into a monster that tries to steal Valt's powers.
54	2	"Powers Unite (transl. Regaining Vitality)" "重获生机"	Bob Harper	Ann Austen	Otis Brayboy	October 22, 2018	2023
Valt gathers up all his friends to find and defeat the tree monster while Trika investigates Valt's power loss.
55	3	"Bad Omen" "不祥之兆 (transl. Ominous Omen)"	Dan Fausett	David McDermott	Mark Davis	October 23, 2018	2023
Yark sees what he thinks is a bad omen and becomes afraid to do anything dangerous, so his friends try to snap him out of it.
56	4	"White Rainbow" "白色彩虹 (transl. White Rainbow)"	Bob Harper	Eric Lewald & Julia Lewald	Andres Alvarez	October 23, 2018	2023
Valt is tasked with guiding a school of migrating Rainbow Fish to their sacred pond while his friends track down a missing bear statue.
57	5	"Baggin' It" "疯狂的斧子 (transl. Crazy Axe)"	Unknown	Unknown	TBA	October 24, 2018	2023
Cobalt wants powers like the rest of his friends so he practices with his trusty bag, but it ends up getting infected with Nanomites.
58	6	"Return of the Floating Island" "回到浮空岛 (transl. Return of the Floating Island)"	Bob Harper	Al Schwartz	Sinae Jung	October 24, 2018	2023
The floating island of the Snow Eagles has been taken over by a half-eagle half-dragon named Pendo. Valt challenges her to a duel to regain control of the island and stop it from crashing into a volcano.
59	7	"Yaks Are Back (transl. Playful Yaks)" "贪玩的牦牛"	Unknown	Unknown	TBA	October 25, 2018	2023
Valt and Yark help Kem make a delivery of fruit to the Land of Metal for a ceremony. When the path gets blocked by a rock slide, Yark gets the other yaks to help clear the way.
60	8	"Goat of Justice (transl. Goat Judge)" "山羊法官"	Bob Harper	Katedid Langrock	George Holguin	October 25, 2018	2023
Kem tries to ask Hui, the unicorn goat of justice, about a strange sound in the forest, but she won't listen to him.
61	9	"Alia the Leader" "非凡的丽娅 (transl. Extraordinary Alia)"	Unknown	Unknown	TBA	October 26, 2018	2023
Alia takes charge in helping two lion temple guardians, Chang and Gao, protect their treasure of Moon Stones from a thief.
62	10	"Baby Kem" "芥末宝宝 (transl. Baby Kem)"	Bob Harper	Rob Loos	Sydney Parris	October 26, 2018	2023
A potion Trika makes for Kem ends up turning him into a baby. Now she, Valt, and Cobalt have to get him a cure before he stays that way forever.
63	11	"Eye of the Tiger" "神奇的老虎草 (transl. Magical Tiger Grass)"	Unknown	Unknown	TBA	October 29, 2018	2023
Trika gets a visit from her younger sister Nika. While out gathering herbs, Nika ingests a Tiger Weed plant that causes her to turn in a rampaging tiger beast.
64	12	"The Dark Storm Grows" "黑暗风暴 (transl. Dark Storm)"	Bob Harper	Dave McDermott	Federico Etchegaray	October 29, 2018	2023
Valt, Alia, and Valanteen go into the forest during a major storm to look for a mysterious boy made out of clay.
65	13	"Moonstruck" "月亮宝石怪兽 (transl. Moon Stone Monster)"	Unknown	Unknown	TBA	October 30, 2018	2023
Chang's supply of Moon Stones is infected by Nanomites and turn into a monster which steals the powers of Valt and his friends. They get help from Tao, the clay boy who has been watching them.
66	14	"Into the Dark Woods" "黑暗森林 (transl. Dark Forest)"	Bob Harper	Denise Downer	Sydney Parris	October 30, 2018	2023
The gang suspects that Dark Warrior is behind the monster attacks so they follow a group of Nanomites to their next target.
67	15	"Cobalt in Charge" "教练蓝宝 (transl. Coach Cobalt)"	Unknown	Unknown	TBA	October 31, 2018	2023
The group gets fed up with Cobalt's strict and critical training regimen so they decide to train on their own, but they may need his coaching skills when they get into trouble at the lake.
68	16	"Monster in the Palace" "失忆的壕哥 (transl. Amnesiac Yark)"	Bob Harper	Dan Wicksman & Nuria Wicksman	Otis Brayboy	October 31, 2018	2023
Yark takes a potion from Trika that causes him to lose his memory giving Dark Warrior and Sia a chance to plant Nanomites inside the palace.
69	17	"Fire in the Bowl" "鲁莽的丽娅 (transl. Reckless Alia)"	Unknown	Unknown	TBA	November 1, 2018	2023
Alia accidentally breaks Ama's teapot right before a big tea ceremony so the group goes to buy a new one. They run into Nor, who agrees to give them a teapot if they can repair his kiln.
70	18	"The Yak Pack" "意外的访客 (transl. Unexpected Guests)"	Bob Harper	Kevin Rubio	Andres Alvarez	November 1, 2018	2023
Yark's dad arrives with Yonk and Yike to assist in helping defend against Dark Warrior's monsters. Their strengths are put to the test when Tao gets kidnapped.
71	19	"Live Tree or Die" "保卫和平树 (transl. Protecting the Peace Tree)"	Unknown	Unknown	TBA	November 2, 2018	2023
A Qilin warns Valt of Dark Warrior's plan to corrupt the Ceremonial Tree. To stop it, he, Trika, and Tao go to receive sand from the bottom of the lake, but Dark Warrior won't make it easy.
72	20	"Firebirds of a Feather" "失窃的太阳宝石 (transl. Stolen Sun Gem)"	Bob Harper	Dan Wicksman & Nuria Wicksman	Otis Brayboy	November 2, 2018	2023
The gang goes to the Land of Fire to ask the Firebird Elder about a feather they found. He asks them to guard the Sun Gem staff for an upcoming event where the gems get supercharged by solar flares. At night, Sia steals the staff for Dark Warrior and they fight him to get it back.
73	21	"Island Break" "逃离孤岛 (transl. Escape from the Desert Island)"	Unknown	Unknown	TBA	November 5, 2018	2023
The group learns of Dark Warrior's plan to open a portal to the Forgotten Island where Da Ming, Mungo, and Drusilla are stranded. They follow him and learn of his plan to free Drusilla. She reveals her real name to be Sying, twin sister to the real Drusilla, and Kem's real mother, who is being held captive.
74	22	"Brother's Keeper" "哥哥的宠物 (transl. Older Brother's Pet)"	Bob Harper	Kirk Kushin	Andres Alvarez	November 5, 2018	2023
The group travels up to the mountains to find Cobalt's older brother Cerulean and ask him about the Nanomites. He shows them where to find the Nanomite hive but he has alternate intentions.
75	23	"Mother of All Hives" "纳米虫老巢 (transl. Nanomite Nest)"	Unknown	Unknown	TBA	November 6, 2018	2023
Valt finds and destroys the Nanomite hive but finds it to be empty. Meanwhile, Sying and Dark Warrior track down and reassemble the bones of a woolly mammoth and turn it into a living weapon.
76	24	"Warrior Prophecy" "武士预言 (transl. Warrior Prophecy)"	Bob Harper	Kevin Rubio	Sydney Parris	November 6, 2018	2023
On the way back from destroying the hive, Valt and Tao end up lost in a series of tunnels where they find a prophecy of who Tao might be.
77	25	"Tao's Journey" "阿陶的秘密 (transl. Tao's Secret)"	Unknown	Unknown	TBA	November 7, 2018	2023
Tao learns that he is one of many clay guardians who once defeated the powerful gorilla warrior Nimbus Khan. Trika takes Tao back through his memories to see what happened to him and what he is meant to do.
78	26	"Mammoth Rising (transl. Mammoth Rebellion)" "猛犸象叛乱"	Bob Harper	Denise Downer	Dan O'Connor	November 7, 2018	2023
Valt, Cobalt, Trika, and Tao head to the Forbidden Lands to search for Sying and Dark Warrior. When Dark warrior catches on, he sends his Nanomites after them. Tao defeats Dark Warrior turning him to clay. Meanwhile, Da Ming explains to Kem how he came to marry Drusilla and how Sying took power.
79	27	"New Dino Day" "遭遇恐龙 (transl. Dinosaur Encounter)"	Dan Fausett	Dan Franklin & Robin Stein	Dan Kubat	November 8, 2018	2023
During a party to celebrate Dark Warrior's defeat, Sying attacks with a dinosaur she resurrected from a tree. The gang fights them off, but not for good. Valt and Tao learn that the only way to stop her is to find and bring back the army of clay warriors from each of the Five Lands.
80	28	"Wakey Wakey Warriors" "唤醒陶俑兵 (transl. Awakening the Terracotta Warriors)"	Bob Harper	Katydid Langrock	Otis Brayboy	November 8, 2018	2023
Valt, Cobalt, and Tao find the location of the clay guardians of the Land of Wood but are unable to wake them up. Meanwhile, Kem, Da-Ming, and Mungo return to land of metal to find that Url is now in charge.
81	29	"Between a Rock (transl. Within the Crevice of a Rock)" "石头缝里"	Unknown	Unknown	TBA	November 9, 2018	2023
Valt, Tao, and Cobalt travel to the Land of Earth to ask the Nine Colored Deer directly how to awaken the clay guardians, but they are followed by Sying who traps Cobalt and Tao in a cave. Meanwhile, Da-Ming tries to reenter the Land of Metal to get his throne back from Url.
82	30	"Try Try Again" "坚持不懈 (transl. Perseverance)"	Bob Harper	David McDermott	Federico Etchegaray	November 9, 2018	2023
Cobalt finds that he has a talent for imitating voices which he puts to good use when Sying attacks trying to find the Land of Wood clay guardians.
83	31	"Yak Fu Anew" "牦牛神功重出江湖 (transl. Yak Divine Inspiration Returns)"	Unknown	Unknown	TBA	November 12, 2018	2023
Yark's parents, Master and Madame Ven, help Valt and his friends locate the guardians of the Land of Water where they find an old clay guardian sword. Meanwhile the rest of the yaks guard the temple from Sying.
84	32	"Journey to the Hidden Village" "进入神秘村 (transl. Entering the Mysterious Village)"	Bob Harper and Otis Brayboy	Dan Franklin & Robin Stein	Sydney Parris	November 12, 2018	2023
The team heads to the Shawen village, where the clay guardians are believed to be. They find that the snow monkey residents have been frozen, and the village is under attack by a legend called the Water Yeti.
85	33	"Pirates of the Portal" "传送门海盗 (transl. Portal Pirates)"	Unknown	Unknown	TBA	November 13, 2018	2023
When Tao's xun is stolen by the Portal Pirates, rogue Taotie that live within portals, the group travels to the space between the portals in order to get it back.
86	34	"Trial of Snow" "雪猴大赛 (transl. Snow Monkey Competition)"	Bob Harper and Otis Brayboy	Al Schwartz	Federico Etchegaray	November 13, 2018	2023
The group arrives in Princess Mirka's village right at the time of the annual Trial of Snow to decide to new leader of the snow monkeys. Cerulean arrives and challenges Mirka for the title of leader and Cobalt finds himself competing against his brother in the tournament.
87	35	"Revenge of Doe" "如意的复仇 (transl. Valanteen's Revenge)"	Unknown	Unknown	TBA	November 14, 2018	2023
Valt is led to an island temple where the clay guardians are being protected by Valanteen. He also learns about Valanteen's ominous plan to get revenge on Sying for stealing her powers.
88	36	"The Case of the Vanished Village" "村庄消失疑案 (transl. Village Disappearance Mystery)"	Bob Harper and Otis Brayboy	Eric Lewald & Julia Lewald	Dan Root	November 14, 2018	2023
Valt, Cobalt, and Tao arrive in the Land of Fire to find that Alia's firebird village has mysteriously disappeared. Now they must solve the mystery of where it went.
89	37	"One Little Problem" "角度问题 (transl. Point of View Problem)"	Unknown	Unknown	TBA	November 15, 2018	2023
Valt and his friends go to find the Altar of Flame where they meet the Giant of Fire who shrinks them down to tiny size.
90	38	"The Armor Round Us" "会跑的盔甲 (transl. Running Armor)"	Otis Brayboy	Mike McCafferty	Peter Ferk	November 15, 2018	2023
The group finds the commander of the Land of Fire clay guardians and help him search for his missing armor, while the commander helps Valt and Cobalt work through a rough patch in their friendship.
91	39	"Heart of Mush" "疯狂蘑宝城 (transl. Crazy Mushie City)"	Unknown	Unknown	TBA	November 16, 2018	2023
Valt is called to the Mushie Kingdom of Sporegar when their Mushie leader, Princess Plushy, is kidnapped by a taotie named Lursa.
92	40	"Be My Guest" "做客惊魂 (transl. Visiting Horror)"	Otis Brayboy	Kirk Kushin	Andres Alvarez	November 16, 2018	2023
While the gang is lost in the tunnels beneath the Land of Metal, Kem accidentally summons the monster Kwai-shou who tries to trap them there forever.
93	41	"Moon Over Taotie" "饕餮王国的月亮 (transl. Moon of the Taotie Kingdom)"	Unknown	Unknown	TBA	November 19, 2018	2023
Sying needs more power so she persuades Gao to help her steal Moon Stones from Chang on the night of the full moon. Meanwhile, Valt's group finds a magic key that leads them to a treasure that may hold the secret of what happened to Kem's mother.
94	42	"Benevolent Dragon" "慈祥的龙 (transl. Kind Dragon)"	Otis Brayboy	Kevin Rubio	Dan O'Connor	November 19, 2018	2023
While escaping one of Sying's dinosaurs, Valt, Cobalt, Kem, and Tao run into the dragon Futanglong who agrees to help if they can find his lost chimu. Da-Ming finds the chimu and uses it to control Futanglong and attack Sying.
95	43	"Grab Bag" "抢夺百宝袋 (transl. Snatch the Bag of Treasures)"	Unknown	Unknown	TBA	November 20, 2018	2023
Cobalt is close to mastering his new magic bag, so Sying decides to steal it from him and the group goes to get it back.
96	44	"Tarred and Feathered" "大战沥青坑 (transl. Tar Pit Battle)"	Dan Fausett	Robert Schauer	TJ Collins	November 20, 2018	2023
The crew digs through the Land of Metal tar pits to search for the clay guardians where they uncover a giant egg, which Sying uses to turn Sia into a dinosaur and attack.
97	45	"Tao's Distraction" "阿陶不见了 (transl. Tao is Missing)"	Unknown	Unknown	TBA	November 21, 2018	2023
Tao gets captured by Da-Ming and Mungo who try to get information about where the clay guardians are from him. When Tao tricks them, Da-Ming tries to get rid of him.
98	46	"Dragon Boat Race" "赛龙舟 (transl. Dragon Boat Race)"	Bob Harper and Otis Brayboy	Jonathan Rosenthal	Sydney Parris	November 21, 2018	2023
Valt, Cobalt, and Tao come to support Trika as she competes in a dragon boat race against land cats Kala and Mitza, but when Trika's granny gets sick Valt fills in for her instead.
99	47	"Daddy Cobalt" "蓝宝当爸了 (transl. Cobalt Becomes a Father)"	Unknown	Unknown	TBA	November 22, 2018	2023
One of Sying's previous dinosaurs takes a liking to Cobalt, so he decides to train it and keep her as a new pet.
100	48	"The Mighty Mighty Mushies" "威武的蘑宝 (transl. Mighty Mushies)"	Otis Brayboy	Kirk Kushin	Dan Kubat	November 22, 2018	2023
Sying steals the lights from the Mushie Kingdom to power up her latest dino and allows her to control plants, so Mushy joins Valt and his friends in the fight to get it back.
101	49	"Worst Nightmare" "最恐怖的噩梦 (transl. Most Terrifying Nightmare)"	Unknown	Unknown	TBA	November 23, 2018	2023
Sying uses her powers to trap Valt and his friends in a shared nightmare where they must face their greatest fears. Meanwhile, Kem and Da-Ming find a message Drusilla, Kem's real mother, left for them before she was captured and they follow it to try and find where she is.
102	50	"The Real Drusilla" "真假达女王 (transl. True or False Drusilla)"	Otis Brayboy	Denise Downer	Fable Siegel	November 23, 2018	2023
Drusilla tells the story of how Sying stole her identity and took Kem away from her soon after he was born. She sets out to get revenge on her sister. Meanwhile, Valt gets all of the clay guardians from each of the Five Lands together in order to come up with a battle strategy to defeat Sying.
103	51	"Guardians and Dinos" "陶俑兵大战恐龙 (transl. Terracotta Warriors Battle Dinosaurs)"	Dan Fausett	Denise Downer	Arthur Valencia and Dan Root	November 26, 2018	2023
The war begins as Sying commands an army of dinosaurs to attack the Five Lands as Valt, his friends, and the battalions of clay guardians fight back. Cobalt stumbles upon an ancient civilization connected to him.
104	52	"Valt's Victory" "迪尔的胜利 (transl. Valt's Victory)"	Otis Brayboy	Denise Downer	Sydney Parris and Rayfield Angrum	November 26, 2018	2023
Valt and his friends are on the verge of defeat when Valanteen and Mirka arrive with reinforcements. Cobalt discovers he is from a long line of dinosaur leaders and uses his new ability to turn the tables in the fight. Sying breaks Valt's horn in a one-on-one fight, but Tao manages to heal him with help from the other clay guardian leaders giving Valt the strength he needs to defeat Sying once and for all.

=== Season 3 (2025) ===
Season 3 of Valt the Wonder Deer, given the subtitle The Legend of Porcelain Mountain (Chinese: 鹿精灵之瓷瓶山的秘密, pinyin: Lù Jīnglíng zhī cípíng shān de mìmì), is a total retool and reboot from the previous seasons, and take place in a separate continuity where characters are completely redesigned to take on more stylistic bipedal humanoid attributes.

The season finished production in 2020, and was approved for two animation broadcast permits by the National Radio and Television Administration in China that year under the permit numbers （京）动审字【2020】第004号 (for the first 26 episodes) and （京）动审字【2020】第005号 (for the remaining 26 episodes), and was set to be originally released in China around December 1, 2021 to February 11, 2022. However, that season ended up being delayed due to financial issues, despite being complete and the presence of promotional clips around 2021, and only ended up eventually being officially publicly released in full on Douyin, Rednote, and Weibo starting August 8, 2025 by a set of social media accounts under the collective name Valt the Wonder Deer Nostalgia (Chinese: 鹿精灵回忆杀, pinyin: Lù Jīnglíng Huíyìshā). Both the English and Chinese dubs were released through those China-based social media websites, though the Chinese dub was released first. Though further seasons beyond the third were planned and teased by DreamEast Pictures, no further seasons have been produced and released as of November 2026, and this season is currently the final season of the show.

No. overall	No. in season	Title	Directed by	Written by	Storyboard by	Original release date	English release date
105	1	"Valt The Powerful" "守护者迪尔 (transl. Guardian Valt)"	Unknown	Unknown	TBA	August 8, 2025 (Douyin, Rednote, Weibo)	December 3, 2025 (Douyin, Rednote, Weibo)
106	2	"Everything Is Fine" "一切都好 (transl. Everything is Fine)"	Unknown	Unknown	TBA	August 8, 2025 (Douyin, Rednote, Weibo)	December 3, 2025 (Douyin, Rednote, Weibo)
107	3	"Valt the Powerless" "法力消失 (transl. Magic Power Disappears)"	Unknown	Unknown	TBA	August 11, 2025 (Douyin, Rednote, Weibo)	December 8, 2025 (Douyin, Rednote, Weibo)
108	4	"Power of Friendship" "友谊的力量 (transl. Power of Friendship)"	Unknown	Unknown	TBA	August 11, 2025 (Douyin, Rednote, Weibo)	December 8, 2025 (Douyin, Rednote, Weibo)
109	5	"The Shadow Monster" "影子怪物 (transl. Shadow Monster)"	Unknown	Unknown	TBA	August 13, 2025 (Douyin, Rednote, Weibo)	December 10, 2025 (Douyin, Rednote, Weibo)
110	6	"The Legend of Abaddon" "影王传说 (transl. Legend of the Shadow King)"	Unknown	Unknown	TBA	August 13, 2025 (Douyin, Rednote, Weibo)	December 10, 2025 (Douyin, Rednote, Weibo)
111	7	"An Endless Appetite" "难以满足的胃口 (transl. Insatiable Appetite)"	Unknown	Unknown	TBA	August 18, 2025 (Douyin, Rednote, Weibo)	December 15, 2025 (Douyin, Rednote, Weibo)
112	8	"Mom's Mochi Balls" "妈妈的炸汤圆 (transl. Mom's Fried Tangyuan)"	Unknown	Unknown	TBA	August 18, 2025 (Douyin, Rednote, Weibo)	December 15, 2025 (Douyin, Rednote, Weibo)
113	9	"The Perfect Plan" "完美计划 (transl. Perfect Plan)"	Unknown	Unknown	TBA	August 20, 2025 (Douyin, Rednote, Weibo)	December 17, 2025 (Douyin, Rednote, Weibo)
114	10	"A New Plan" "新的计划 (transl. New Plan)"	Unknown	Unknown	TBA	August 20, 2025 (Douyin, Rednote, Weibo)	December 17, 2025 (Douyin, Rednote, Weibo)
115	11	"The Real Da-Ming" "真假达大王 (transl. True or False Da-Ming)"	Unknown	Unknown	TBA	August 25, 2025 (Douyin, Rednote, Weibo)	December 22, 2025 (Douyin, Rednote, Weibo)
116	12	"The Power of Trust" "信任的力量 (transl. Power of Trust)"	Unknown	Unknown	TBA	August 25, 2025 (Douyin, Rednote, Weibo)	December 22, 2025 (Douyin, Rednote, Weibo)
117	13	"The Messy Bag" "乱糟糟的百宝袋 (transl. Messy Bag of Treasures)"	Unknown	Unknown	TBA	August 27, 2025 (Douyin, Rednote, Weibo)	December 24, 2025 (Douyin, Rednote, Weibo)
118	14	"Mooncakes" "中秋节的月饼 (transl. Mid-Autumn Festival Mooncakes)"	Unknown	Unknown	TBA	August 27, 2025 (Douyin, Rednote, Weibo)	December 24, 2025 (Douyin, Rednote, Weibo)
119	15	"Fast Forward" "时间快进 (transl. Fast-Forward in Time)"	Unknown	Unknown	TBA	September 1, 2025 (Douyin, Rednote, Weibo)	December 29, 2025 (Douyin, Rednote, Weibo)
120	16	"The Sunstone Scepter" "龙头宝石拐杖 (transl. Dragon Head Gem Cane)"	Unknown	Unknown	TBA	September 1, 2025 (Douyin, Rednote, Weibo)	December 29, 2025 (Douyin, Rednote, Weibo)
121	17	"Confused Elder" "糊涂的老村长 (transl. Confused Old Village Chief)"	Unknown	Unknown	TBA	September 4, 2025 (Douyin, Rednote, Weibo)	December 31, 2025 (Douyin, Rednote, Weibo)
122	18	"Body Swap" "互换身体 (transl. Body Swap)"	Unknown	Unknown	TBA	September 4, 2025 (Douyin, Rednote, Weibo)	December 31, 2025 (Douyin, Rednote, Weibo)
123	19	"Lava Lake 1" "火猴子与岩浆湖城 (transl. Fire Monkey and Magma Lake City)"	Unknown	Unknown	TBA	September 8, 2025 (Douyin, Rednote, Weibo)	January 5, 2026 (Douyin, Rednote, Weibo)
124	20	"Lava Lake 2" "岩浆湖冠军赛 (transl. Magma Lake Championship)"	Unknown	Unknown	TBA	September 8, 2025 (Douyin, Rednote, Weibo)	January 5, 2026 (Douyin, Rednote, Weibo)
125	21	"Lava Lake 3" "冲出岩浆湖城 (transl. Charging Out Magma Lake City)"	Unknown	Unknown	TBA	September 10, 2025 (Douyin, Rednote, Weibo)	January 7, 2026 (Douyin, Rednote, Weibo)
126	22	"One Night at the Inn" "客栈一夜 (transl. A Night in the Inn)"	Unknown	Unknown	TBA	September 10, 2025 (Douyin, Rednote, Weibo)	January 7, 2026 (Douyin, Rednote, Weibo)
127	23	"Belly of the Beast" "火麒麟的肚子 (transl. Fire Qilin's Belly)"	Unknown	Unknown	TBA	September 15, 2025 (Douyin, Rednote, Weibo)	January 12, 2026 (Douyin, Rednote, Weibo)
128	24	"The Power of Compliments" "赞美的力量 (transl. Power of Praise)"	Unknown	Unknown	TBA	September 15, 2025 (Douyin, Rednote, Weibo)	January 12, 2026 (Douyin, Rednote, Weibo)
129	25	"Mushy Spots" "小蘑宝的斑点 (transl. Little Mushie's Spots)"	Unknown	Unknown	TBA	September 17, 2025 (Douyin, Rednote, Weibo)	January 14, 2026 (Douyin, Rednote, Weibo)
130	26	"Play Time" "独眼巨婴的游戏 (transl. One-Eyed Giant Baby's Game)"	Unknown	Unknown	TBA	September 17, 2025 (Douyin, Rednote, Weibo)	January 14, 2026 (Douyin, Rednote, Weibo)
131	27	"Trika the Three-Eyed Cat" "三眼喵妹 (transl. Three-Eyed Trika)"	Unknown	Unknown	TBA	September 22, 2025 (Douyin, Rednote, Weibo)	January 19, 2026 (Douyin, Rednote, Weibo)
132	28	"Trika the Two-Eyed Cat" "普通的喵妹 (transl. Ordinary Trika)"	Unknown	Unknown	TBA	September 22, 2025 (Douyin, Rednote, Weibo)	January 19, 2026 (Douyin, Rednote, Weibo)
133	29	"I Spy with My 3rd Eye" "寻找第三只眼 (transl. Searching for the Third Eye)"	Unknown	Unknown	TBA	September 24, 2025 (Douyin, Rednote, Weibo)	January 21, 2026 (Douyin, Rednote, Weibo)
134	30	"The Gift" "奶奶的礼物 (transl. Grandmother's Gift)"	Unknown	Unknown	TBA	September 24, 2025 (Douyin, Rednote, Weibo)	January 21, 2026 (Douyin, Rednote, Weibo)
135	31	"Without You" "没有你在身边 (transl. Without You Around)"	Unknown	Unknown	TBA	September 29, 2025 (Douyin, Rednote, Weibo)	January 26, 2026 (Douyin, Rednote, Weibo)
136	32	"An Overlooked Hero" "受冷落的英雄 (transl. Ignored Hero)"	Unknown	Unknown	TBA	September 29, 2025 (Douyin, Rednote, Weibo)	January 26, 2026 (Douyin, Rednote, Weibo)
137	33	"The Polluted Waterfall" "污水之源 (transl. Source of Sewage)"	Unknown	Unknown	TBA	October 13, 2025 (Douyin, Rednote, Weibo)	January 28, 2026 (Douyin, Rednote, Weibo)
138	34	"Hooray for the Heroes" "英雄之歌 (transl. Heroes' Song)"	Unknown	Unknown	TBA	October 13, 2025 (Douyin, Rednote, Weibo)	January 28, 2026 (Douyin, Rednote, Weibo)
139	35	"Trapped in Paradise" "困在幻境 (transl. Trapped in Dreamland)"	Unknown	Unknown	TBA	October 15, 2025 (Douyin, Rednote, Weibo)	February 2, 2026 (Douyin, Rednote, Weibo)
140	36	"An Unhappy Hero" "不快乐的英雄 (transl. Unhappy Hero)"	Unknown	Unknown	TBA	October 15, 2025 (Douyin, Rednote, Weibo)	February 2, 2026 (Douyin, Rednote, Weibo)
141	37	"A Real Hero" "真正的英雄 (transl. True Hero)"	Unknown	Unknown	TBA	October 20, 2025 (Douyin, Rednote, Weibo)	February 4, 2026 (Douyin, Rednote, Weibo)
142	38	"The Pit" "坠入深坑 (transl. Falling into a Deep Pit)"	Unknown	Unknown	TBA	October 20, 2025 (Douyin, Rednote, Weibo)	February 4, 2026 (Douyin, Rednote, Weibo)
143	39	"Da-Ming's Lucky Jade Pendant" "达大王的幸运玉坠 (transl. Da-Ming's Lucky Jade Pendant)"	Unknown	Unknown	TBA	October 22, 2025 (Douyin, Rednote, Weibo)	March 2, 2026 (Douyin, Rednote, Weibo)
144	40	"The Magic Crystal" "魔力水晶 (transl. Magic Crystal)"	Unknown	Unknown	TBA	October 22, 2025 (Douyin, Rednote, Weibo)	March 2, 2026 (Douyin, Rednote, Weibo)
145	41	"One of the Good Guys" "好人达大王 (transl. Good Guy Da-Ming)"	Unknown	Unknown	TBA	October 27, 2025 (Douyin, Rednote, Weibo)	March 4, 2026 (Douyin, Rednote, Weibo)
146	42	"The Forest of Terrors" "恐怖森林 (transl. Terrifying Forest)"	Unknown	Unknown	TBA	October 27, 2025 (Douyin, Rednote, Weibo)	March 4, 2026 (Douyin, Rednote, Weibo)
147	43	"Head Over Heart" "该放手了 (transl. Need to Let Go)"	Unknown	Unknown	TBA	October 29, 2025 (Douyin, Rednote, Weibo)	March 9, 2026 (Douyin, Rednote, Weibo)
148	44	"Cobalt's Brother/Shades of Blue (Note: Despite the English titles of episodes 44 and 45 of season 3 using a slash to separate two alternate titles, they are still one full 13-minute episode each, rather than being divided into two separate smaller segments each (as such episode title formatting might usually suggest). This is reflected with the Chinese titles of those very same episodes, each retaining one singular title.)" "蓝宝的家 (transl. Cobalt's Home)"	Unknown	Unknown	TBA	October 29, 2025 (Douyin, Rednote, Weibo)	March 9, 2026 (Douyin, Rednote, Weibo)
149	45	"Magic Tree/Test of the Ancient Tree " "森林的考验 (transl. Forest's Trial)"	Unknown	Unknown	TBA	November 3, 2025 (Douyin, Rednote, Weibo)	March 11, 2026 (Douyin, Rednote, Weibo)
150	46	"Heart Over Head" "森林女王 (transl. Forest Queen)"	Unknown	Unknown	TBA	November 3, 2025 (Douyin, Rednote, Weibo)	March 11, 2026 (Douyin, Rednote, Weibo)
151	47	"The Last Piece" "最后一块碎片 (transl. Final Fragment)"	Unknown	Unknown	TBA	November 5, 2025 (Douyin, Rednote, Weibo)	March 16, 2026 (Douyin, Rednote, Weibo)
152	48	"Friends Get Together" "好友重聚 (transl. Friend Reunion)"	Unknown	Unknown	TBA	November 5, 2025 (Douyin, Rednote, Weibo)	March 16, 2026 (Douyin, Rednote, Weibo)
153	49	"Abaddon Strikes Back" "影王的陷阱 (transl. Shadow King's Trap)"	Unknown	Unknown	TBA	November 10, 2025 (Douyin, Rednote, Weibo)	March 18, 2026 (Douyin, Rednote, Weibo)
154	50	"The Truth Comes Out" "重拾信心 (transl. Regaining Confidence)"	Unknown	Unknown	TBA	November 10, 2025 (Douyin, Rednote, Weibo)	March 18, 2026 (Douyin, Rednote, Weibo)
155	51	"Face Your Shadow" "直面你的阴影 (transl. Face Your Shadow)"	Unknown	Unknown	TBA	November 12, 2025 (Douyin, Rednote, Weibo)	March 23, 2026 (Douyin, Rednote, Weibo)
156	52	"Not Afraid Anymore" "战胜阴影 (transl. Defeating the Shadows)"	Unknown	Unknown	TBA	November 12, 2025 (Douyin, Rednote, Weibo)	March 23, 2026 (Douyin, Rednote, Weibo)
