= February 1901 =

Month in 1901

<<	February 1901					>>
Su	Mo	Tu	We	Th	Fr	Sa
					1	2
3	4	5	6	7	8	9
10	11	12	13	14	15	16
17	18	19	20	21	22	23
24	25	26	27	28

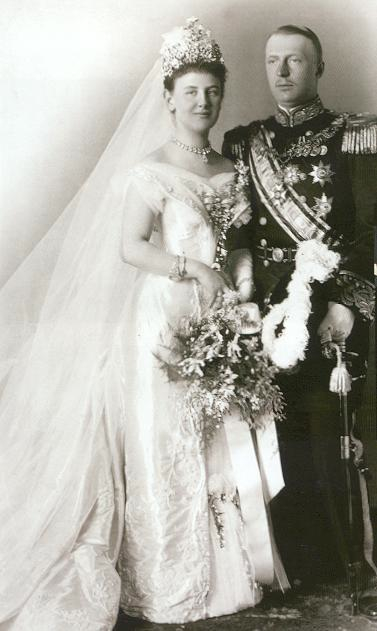
February 7, 1901: Netherlands royal wedding of Queen Wilhelmina and Prince Henry

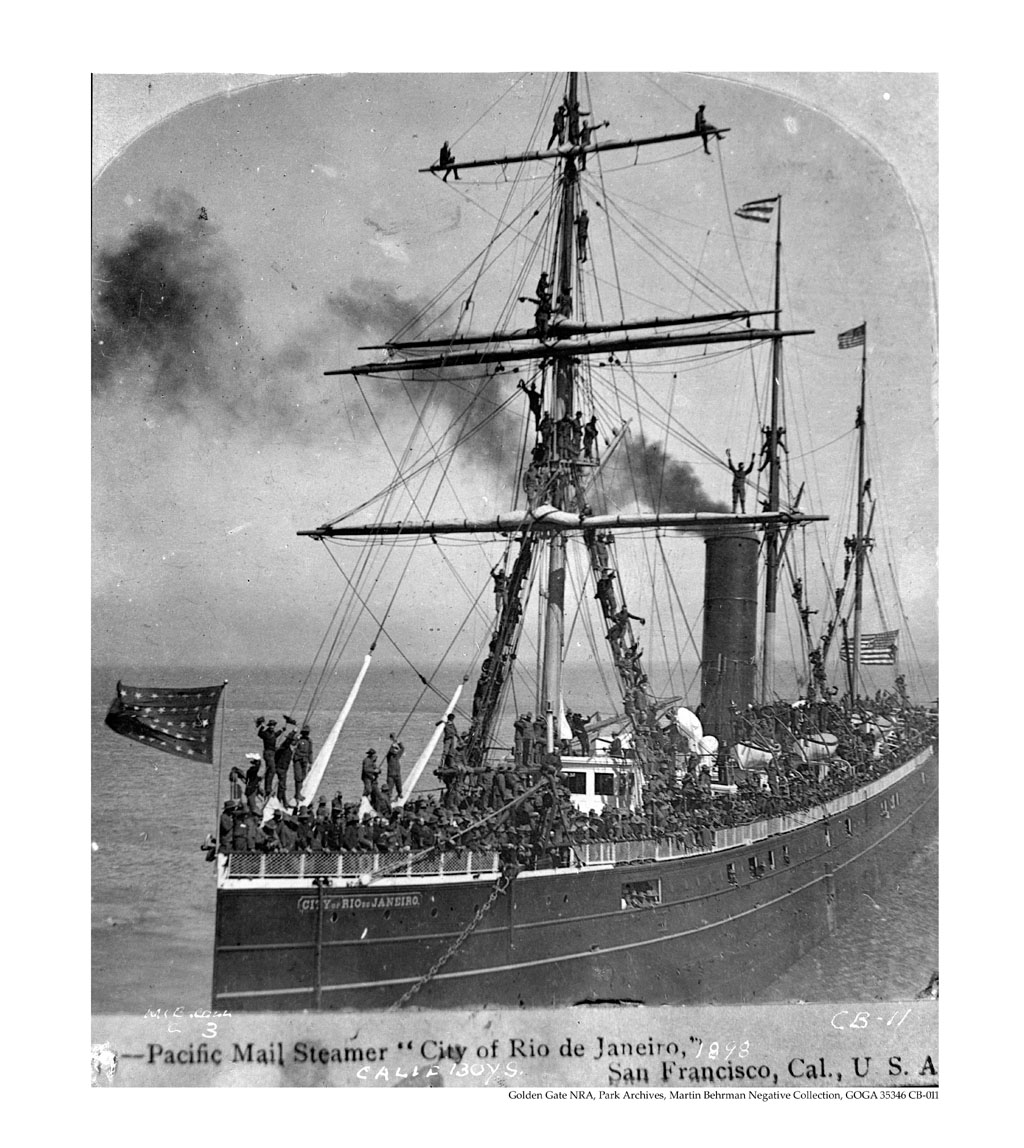
February 22, 1901: The City of Rio de Janeiro sinks as it arrives at San Francisco Bay, drowning 131 on board

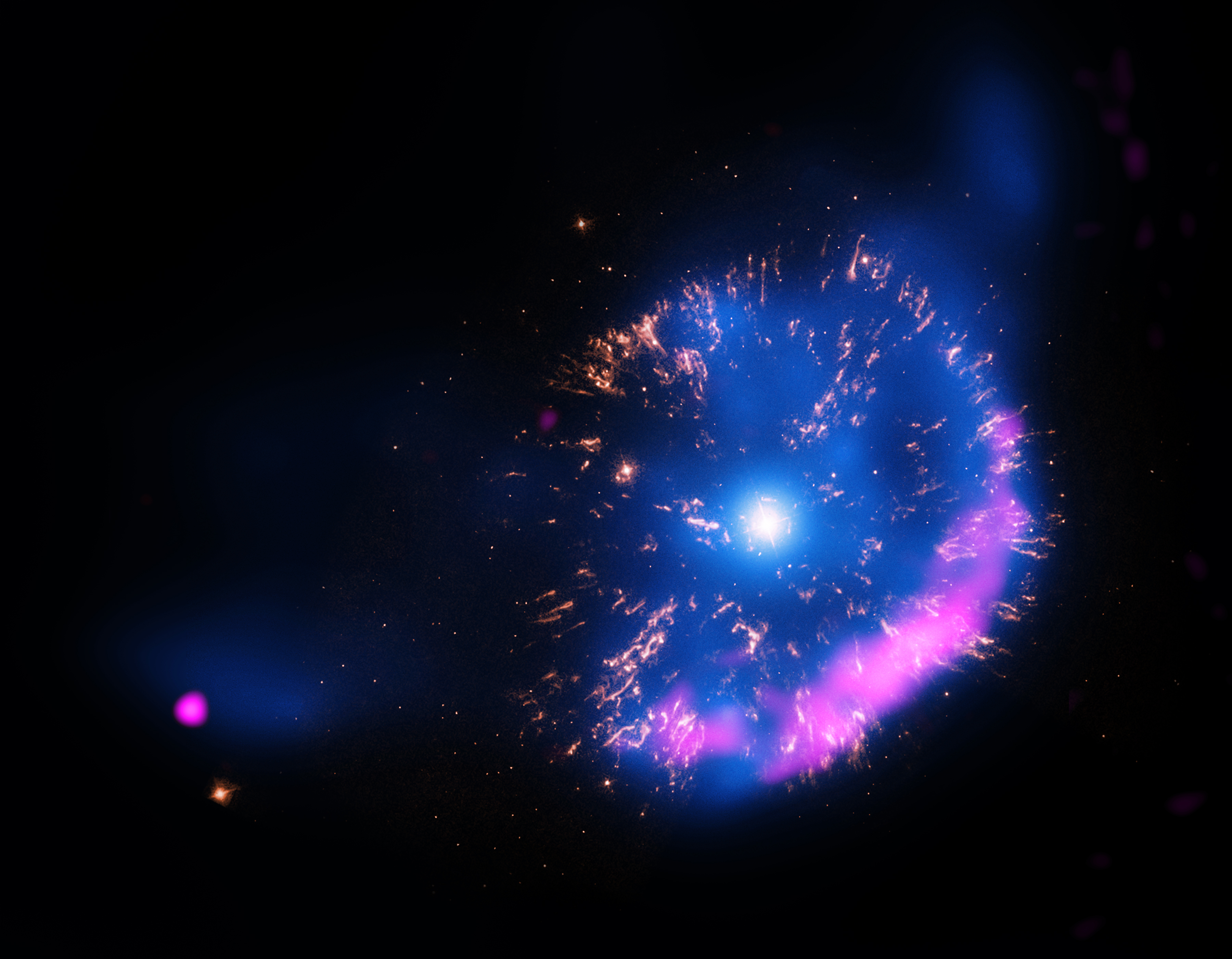
February 21, 1901: GK Persei nova seen on Earth after 1,533 years

The following events occurred in February 1901:

== February 1, 1901 (Friday) ==
- New Zealand became the first nation to create a governmental agency devoted to promoting tourism, with the creation of the Department of Tourist and Health Resorts.
- China's Fists of Righteous Harmony (Yihequan I-ho-chuan), which had fomented the killing of foreigners that became the Boxer Rebellion, was formally outlawed by the Imperial government.
- The body of Queen Victoria was transported from the Isle of Wight to Portsmouth on board her personal yacht, HMY Alberta.
- On Wall Street, New York City, the largest railroad network in the United States was announced when the Union Pacific Railroad acquired a majority of the stock of the Southern Pacific Railroad Company. A syndicate composed of William Kissam Vanderbilt, J. P. Morgan, and the Rockefeller family purchased 1,300,000 shares of Southern Pacific for $10,000,000 to create "a continuous system under one control, extending from New York to San Francisco by rail and from San Francisco down the western coast as far as Panama and out across the Pacific to the Orient by steamers."
- Born:
  - Frank Buckles, American soldier, last surviving American veteran of World War I, in Bethany, Missouri (d. 2011)
  - Clark Gable, American film actor, known for starring roles in Mutiny on the Bounty and Gone with the Wind, recipient of the Academy Award for Best Actor for It Happened One Night, in Cadiz, Ohio (d. 1960)
- Died: Fitzedward Hall, 75, American linguist, one of the major U.S. contributors to the Oxford English Dictionary project and the first American to translate works from the Sanskrit language into the English language (b. 1825).

== February 2, 1901 (Saturday) ==
- The funeral of Queen Victoria took place at St George's Chapel in Windsor Castle after her body was transported from Portsmouth to London. The day before, the funeral procession had brought her from Osborne House to Portsmouth. Present at her funeral were the Kings of the United Kingdom, Germany, Portugal and Greece, and the future kings of Denmark and Sweden. According to contemporary accounts, the noise of the cannon firing at her funeral was not heard on the outskirts of London, "yet it was heard loudly at a number of villages in an approximate ring around 150 kilometres from the source".
- The United States Army Reorganization Bill, officially called "An Act To Increase the Efficiency of the Permanent Military Establishment of the United States", was signed into law by President William McKinley.
- The United States Army Nurse Corps was established as a permanent part of the United States Army's Medical Department. Although they could not yet become officers, women could now enlist in the Army for three year terms.
- Benjamin O. Davis Sr., who would become the first African-American general in the United States Army, received his first commission as an officer, when he was made a second lieutenant in the U.S. 9th Cavalry. Davis, who had enlisted as a private less than two years earlier, had been mentored by Major Charles Young, who, at the time, was the only other black officer in the United States Army.
- After starting only one week earlier, George Bernard Shaw completed the three act play The Admirable Bashville, a stage adaptation of his novel Cashel Byron's Profession.
- Born: Jascha Heifetz, Lithuanian violinist, in Vilna, Russian Empire (now Vilnius, Lithuania) (d. 1987)

== February 3, 1901 (Sunday) ==
- The Japanese ultra-nationalist Black Dragon Society (Kokuryukai) was formed by Ryōhei Uchida to advocate the conquest of Korea, war against Russia, and the expansion of the Japanese Empire's control of Asia.
- Eighteen members of the "Snake clan" of the Creek Indian tribe were charged with treason against the United States and jailed in Muskogee, Oklahoma.
- Born:
  - Rosamond Lehmann, British novelist, in Bourne End, Buckinghamshire, England (d. 1990)
  - Arvid Wallman, Swedish Olympic diver, in Gothenburg, Sweden (d. 1982)
- Died:
  - Fukuzawa Yukichi, 66, Japanese economist, described as "the most influential thinker of the Meiji era in Japan after 1868", who guided the modernization of Japan after the Meiji Restoration, founded Keio University, and promoted the introduction of Western ideas into Japan. It would later be written, "it was from the foundations laid down by Fukuzawa and others like him that Japan rose to become one of the economic leaders of the world" (b 1835).
  - Francis V. Woodhouse, 96, the last survivor of the "Twelve Apostles" of the Catholic Apostolic Church that had been organized in 1835. The central tenet of that church's members, that the Second Coming of Jesus Christ would take place before the death of the last of the new apostles, failed to be realized. No provision had been made for successors to any of the 12.
  - Tom O'Brien, American baseball player, outfielder and first baseman for the Pittsburgh Pirates, died of pneumonia caused by typhoid fever (b. 1873). O'Brien had been ill since a post-season player tour of Cuba, when he was persuaded to drink a bucket of salt water in order to "cleanse his system".

== February 4, 1901 (Monday) ==
- The Italian opera Tosca, by Giacomo Puccini, had its American premiere, at the Metropolitan Opera House in New York City, with soprano Milka Ternina and tenor Giuseppe Cremonini as Floria Tosca and Mario Cavaradossi, respectively, and Luigi Mancinelli conducting the orchestra. It would be an immediate success, and an author would later call it an opera "of apparently unflagging popularity... there must be scarcely a city or a town in the United States where opera has been given in the last eighty years that has not been exposed to at least one Tosca".
- On the same evening, the three-act comedy Captain Jinks of the Horse Marines, by Clyde Fitch, opened on Broadway theatre at the Garrick Theatre for the first of 168 performances. The play was a sensation, and made a star of Ethel Barrymore.
- The body of Queen Victoria was entombed at Frogmore Mausoleum in Windsor, next to that of her late husband, Prince Albert, whom she had survived for 39 years.
- With the signing into law of the "Canteen Act" two days earlier, the United States Department of War issued General Order Number 1 implementing the Act's provision against "the sale of, or dealing in, beer, wine or any intoxicating liquors by any person in any exchange or canteen or army transport or upon any premises used for military purposes by the United States." "Commanding officers will immediately carry the provisions of this law into full force and effect," the order stated, "and will be held strictly responsible that no exceptions or invasions are permitted."
- Andrew Carnegie, who owned 54 percent of Carnegie Steel Company, sold all of his shares to J. P. Morgan and associates. Although the details were kept confidential, it was estimated that Carnegie received at least 85 million dollars, equivalent to more than 2.4 billion dollars in 2016.
- By a vote of 15–14, the Cuban Constitutional Convention approved an electoral college system for electing the nation's president, rather than a popular vote.
- "John Marshall Day" was celebrated in major cities across the United States in honor of the centennial of the day that Marshall became the Chief Justice of the United States.
- Died: Jefferson F. Long, 64, a former slave who became the first African-American elected to represent the state of Georgia in the United States House of Representatives, of influenza. He served only two months, from January to March, 1871.

== February 5, 1901 (Tuesday) ==
- Thomas Edison discovered and patented the rechargeable nickel–iron battery system and made plans to market it commercially, but would soon come into conflict with Swedish inventor Waldemar Jungner, who had filed a patent in Europe only two weeks earlier (January 22) for a process using nickel-iron storage cells. The technologies would later be superseded by improvements on Jungner's nickel–cadmium battery.
- The United States Senate voted to declassify all United States Department of State papers relating to the peace negotiations that ended the Spanish–American War, including U.S. President William McKinley's instructions to the American negotiators. These would reveal, among other things, that the only territory that the United States originally had wanted Spain to completely give up was Puerto Rico and its surrounding islands. Other correspondence showed that the principal reason for acquiring "Porto Rico" was to expand the prestige of the United States in competition with other colonial powers.
- In Evansville, Indiana, a fire burned through the business district, causing $175,000 of damage.
- Henry E. Youtsey was sentenced to life imprisonment for being the principal conspirator in the 1900 assassination of Kentucky Governor-elect William Goebel. After serving nearly 18 years of his sentence, however, Youtsey would be paroled on December 11, 1918, and given a pardon by outgoing Governor James D. Black on December 1, 1919.
- By act of the Alabama Legislature, the city of Daphne, Alabama, ceased to be the county seat for Baldwin County and all county government offices and records were moved to the smaller town of Bay Minette. The legislation would precipitate a fight between the two cities, all the way to the state supreme court, as well as a violent confrontation during the October removal of the records.
- The West Florida Annexation Association, a group of businessmen led by Colonel J. J. Sullivan of Pensacola, appeared before the Alabama Legislature and presented their proposal for annexation of that part of the state to Alabama.
- Abraham Esau, 35, a coloured citizen of the Boer Cape Colony, worked as a British spy during the Second Boer War after local Boer commander refused to let the coloured citizens take up weapons to lead the fight. After the Boers retook the town of Calvinia, Esau was eliminated by being dragged to the outskirts of town and shot, and his body was then displayed in the village as a warning. When the British routed the Boers the next day, Esau was buried with full British Army honors.
- Born: Gaston Schoukens, Belgian film director who made numerous comedies, melodramas and documentaries, including the first Belgian sound film, La famille Kelpkens, and the popular 1950 comedy Un Soir de Joie, as Felix Bell in Brussels (d. 1961)

== February 6, 1901 (Wednesday) ==
- In China, a list of 12 former Chinese government officials was made public by the ministers from the Eight-Nation Alliance, with the demand that nine of them be executed for crimes committed during the Boxer Rebellion of the year before. Three were, reportedly, already dead; Hau Chung Yu and Kih Siu had been taken prisoner by Japan, which planned to put them to death; and China had already agreed to put Yu Hsien and Prince Chuang to death. No decision had been made by China concerning Chao Hsu Kiao and Ying Lien. China had earlier noted that it would be impossible to kill General Tung Fu Siang, who was very popular among Muslims and western Chinese, and it was expected that Prince Tuan and Duke Lan would banished.
- A vote of no confidence brought down the government of Italy. Prime Minister Giuseppe Saracco and his cabinet resigned the next day.
- Second Boer War: The Boers succeeded in cutting off the Delagoa Bay Railroad at a point 30 miles (48 km) from the Portuguese West Africa capital, Lourenço Marques (now Maputo, Angola).
- The Sacred Fount, a novel by Henry James, was first published. Charles Scribner's Sons of New York City initially printed 3,000 copies, and on February 15, Methuen & Company would print 3,500 copies in London.
- General Order Number 9 was issued by United States Secretary of War Elihu Root as one of his first acts of business under the authority of the new Army Reorganization Act. The traditional practice of "permanent" appointments to staff departments was eliminated, and required that staff officers to be rotated out after four years so that others could gain experience.
- Albert Henry Munsell applied for the patent for his new invention, the Lumenometer, which allowed the most accurate measurements at that time of measuring the hue, light and chroma of individual colors. The device, which would receive U.S. Patent No. 686,827 on November 19, would lead to his development of the Munsell color system.
- Robert Borden was elected as Leader of the Opposition in the House of Commons of Canada by his fellow Conservative Party parliament members. In 1911, the Conservative Party would win control of the government, and Borden would become Prime Minister of Canada.
- Stagecoach robber Joe Boot earned a place in Western lore by becoming one of the few inmates of the infamous Yuma Territorial Prison to successfully escape. Given a 30-year sentence on November 11, 1899, Boot gained the trust of the prison staff and was allowed the job of driving a horse-drawn wagon to deliver food to prisoners working outside the prison. After making his usual departure through the prison gates for his delivery, Boot kept going, and would never be recaptured.
- Born:
  - Ben Lyon, American actor and business executive, in Atlanta (d. 1979)
  - Thomas E. Fraser, American naval officer, led the attack of four destroyers against a Japanese force in a battle off Savo Island and went down with his ship, the destroyer USS Walke (DD-416); in Stafford Springs, Connecticut (d. 1942) The destroyer USS Thomas E. Fraser would be named in his honor.

== February 7, 1901 (Thursday) ==
- German immunologist Paul Uhlenhuth published his paper A Method for Investigation of Different Types of Blood, Especially for the Differential Diagnosis of Human Blood. In an understatement about the significance of his findings, Uhlenhuth commented as an aside, "It is noteworthy... that, after drying blood samples from men, horses and cattle on a board for four weeks and dissolving them in physiological NaCl solution, I was able to identify the human blood at once using my serum— a fact that should be of particular importance for forensic medicine." As an author would note more than a century later, "With these few words, Uhlenhuth announced the world that he had found the Holy Grail of serology: a definitive test for the presence of human blood."
- Queen Wilhelmina of the Netherlands was married to Prince Henry, with a civil ceremony at 11:00 a.m. at The Hague, and a religious ceremony at noon.
- American sailors from the USS Lancaster were attacked and beaten by a mob after they went ashore at the city of La Guaira in Venezuela.
- Representatives of the Choctaw and Chickasaw nations in Oklahoma signed a draft of a proposed agreement with the United States Department of the Interior for division of their tribal lands in Indian Territory, but the initial plan would be rejected by the United States Congress. A binding agreement, as supplemented, would pass into law on July 1, 1902.
- Born: Alison Marjorie Ashby, Australian botanist and artist, in North Adelaide, Australia (d. 1987)
- Died: Benjamin Edward Woolf, 64, British-American violinist, composer, and playwright, best known for the operas The Mighty Dollar and Westward Ho (b. 1836)

== February 8, 1901 (Friday) ==
- In Saint Petersburg, the Russian Foreign Ministry received the Chinese ambassador and presented him with Russia's conditions for withdrawal of troops from Manchuria; a historian would note later, "this document was really an ultimatum that applied to all of Manchuria... Its provisions were largely unacceptable to China and its purport totally unacceptable to Japan.
- Indiana University began its college basketball program, losing 20–17 to Butler University at Irvington, Indiana (later annexed to Indianapolis). Ernest Strange was the high scorer for the Hoosiers in the first game, with nine points, including all seven of Indiana's free throws.
- Born:
  - Virginius Dabney, American journalist, recipient of the Pulitzer Prize, editor of the Richmond Times-Dispatch, in Charlottesville, Virginia (d. 1995)
  - Gustav Dahrendorf, German politician, member of parliament who would be arrested and charged with treason after being suspected of involvement in the 1944 assassination plot against Adolf Hitler, in Hamburg. Remarkably, Dahrendorf would be given a 7-year prison sentence rather than being executed and be released after the German surrender (d. 1954).

== February 9, 1901 (Saturday) ==
- United States Secretary of War Elihu Root notified Leonard Wood, the American Governor-General of Cuba, of five points that needed to go into the Constitution that Cuba was to adopt before independence could be granted. All of the points — American approval of Cuban treaties, limitations on Cuba's ability to borrow money, the American right of intervention to maintain a stable government, continuation of laws implemented by the American occupational government, and permission to establish naval bases in Cuba — meant that Cuba would function as an American protectorate rather than a fully independent nation.
- Taking inspiration from the crusade of Carrie Nation, an estimated 1,000 men and women in Holton, Kansas (out of a population of 3,082 that included children), assembled at local Methodist Church and then marched to the Hicks Saloon and destroyed its contents. According to reporters, "the gutters were deluged with a mixture of beer, whisky, and the usual poisonous decoctions dealt out by the Kansas jointists" and then removed the bar fixtures, furniture, glassware, and a large mirror and destroyed them with sledgehammers. Thomas Balding and John Bimrod, two other proprietors, had removed their liquors earlier in anticipation of a raid, pledged that they would ship everything out of town by Monday, "and each gave his oath never to sell another drop of liquor in Holton".
- Born:
  - Sebastian Kunjukunju Bhagavathar, Indian stage actor, in Ambalappuzha, Kerala, India (d. 1985)
  - Gertrud Scholtz-Klink, German state official, leader of the National Socialist Women's League (Nationalsozialistische Frauenschaft), the women's wing of the Nazi Party (d. 1999)
  - James Murray, American film actor (d. 1936)
- Died:
  - Fred Harvey, 65, American entrepreneur, founder of the first American restaurant chain, the Harvey House restaurants that were adjacent to railroad stations on the Santa Fe Railroad (b. 1835)
  - George Earl Maney, 74, American army officer and diplomat, brigadier general for the Confederate States Army during the American Civil War, who later became the American ambassador to several different nations in South America after reaffirming his allegiance to the United States (b. 1826)

== February 10, 1901 (Sunday) ==
- Excavating the ruins of the Achaemenid Empire acropolis, at the site of the ancient city of Susa in Iran, French archaeologist Jacques de Morgan discovered a tomb that had been unopened for 2200 years. The skeleton inside was "strewn about the head and neck" with "a mass of finely-wrought and artistic gems and jewels". Most of these would later end up in the Louvre, and while there were no clues to identify the person in the tomb, coins inside the bronze sarcophagus dated from as late as 332 BC, shortly before the end of the Achaemenid era.
- In British Somaliland, British and Somali forces fought near Sannasa. The British, on a punitive expedition, lost 17 of 500 men when the Somalis attacked; the Somali force reportedly lost 150 men as it was turned back.
- General Christiaan de Wet, accompanied by 5,000 soldiers, led a Boer invasion into Britain's Cape Colony.
- The census of Italy was completed and the population was officially certified as 32,475,253 people.
- The body of the last victim of the 1900 Galveston hurricane was found, and was identified as a 14-year-old girl. She was one of more than 6,000 people who had died when the hurricane struck Galveston, Texas, on September 8, 1900.
- Max Joseph von Pettenkofer, 82, Bavarian chemist and hygienist who had demonstrated in 1892 — by experimenting on himself— that the cholera germ alone could not cause the disease without incubating conditions, committed suicide by shooting himself at the Residenz in Munich.
- Born:
  - Richard Brauer, German-American mathematician, founder of modular representation theory, in Charlottenburg, Germany (d. 1977). He is remembered for Brauer's theorem on induced characters, as well as the Brauer–Fowler theorem and the Brauer–Suzuki theorem.
- Died: Albert D. Shaw, American politician, U.S. Representative for Maine and champion of veterans benefits at the Grand Army of the Republic (b. 1841)

== February 11, 1901 (Monday) ==
- The Chicago Daily Tribune published a report that Florence Maybrick, an American woman who had been imprisoned since 1889 in the United Kingdom after being convicted of poisoning her husband, was pardoned by King Edward after more than 11 years and released from the women's prison at Aylesbury, England. To everyone's great disappointment, the story turned out to be false and was retracted the next day in the newspaper, but not before being reprinted by news outlets across the country.
- By a 15–14 vote, the Cuban constitutional convention changed an existing rule, making it possible for General Máximo Gómez to become eligible to be the nation's president.
- Died: Milan, 47, King of Serbia from 1882 until his sudden and unexplained abdication in 1889, in exile (b. 1854)

== February 12, 1901 (Tuesday) ==
- The state of Delaware ratified the Thirteenth, Fourteenth and Fifteenth Amendment to the United States Constitution, more than 30 years after they had taken effect. J. Frank Allee, a state Senator who would later be selected to represent Delaware in the United States Senate, introduced the legislation after discovering that his state had never ratified the three amendments. The Senate voted its approval on January 30, and the House followed on January 31. Despite Senator Alee's belief that Delaware was alone still having failed to ratify the three post-American Civil War amendments, Kentucky would not formally approve the 13th, 14th and 15th until 1976. Mississippi's approval of the 13th (abolishing slavery) would not happen until 1995, and Tennessee's endorsement of the 15th (giving all races the right to vote) would not be remedied until 1997.
- As Viceroy of India, Lord Curzon created the new North-West Frontier Province in the north of the Punjab region, bordering Afghanistan.

== February 13, 1901 (Wednesday) ==
- Shortly before 2:00 in the afternoon, William McKinley was formally declared the winner of the presidential election, as a joint session of United States Congress witnessed the formal counting of the electoral votes. After reading the returns from the 45 states, U.S. Senator William P. Frye of Maine, the President pro tempore of the United States Senate, announced that the McKinley/Roosevelt ticket had 202 votes and the Byran/Stevenson campaign had 155. The Chicago Tribune commented that "the gathering of the House and Senate with the brilliantly attired women in the gallery would never be taken by a foreigner for an official assemblage to determine the right of succession to the Chief Executive of 75,000,000 people"
- According to an account at the time by magistrate Gao Shaochen, an estimated 1,000 German troops arrived at the western entrance of the city of Yongqing and, without warning, opened fire on the population, killing 200 Chinese soldiers and civilians.
- At the Mengo Hospital in Uganda, British missionary doctors J. Howard Cook and Albert Cook first noticed the outbreak of an illness with mysterious symptoms, the first signs of what would become an epidemic of African trypanosomiasis, commonly called "sleeping sickness".
- Bessie Taylor, an English barmaid, became the second of three mistresses of George Chapman to die suddenly. After the death of Chapman's third mistress in 1902, Miss Taylor's body would be exhumed and found to be poisoned with antimony, and Chapman would be tried and convicted of her murder.
- Born:
  - Vasili Kuznetsov, Soviet state leader, First Deputy Chairman of the Presidium of the Supreme Soviet from 1977 to 1986, who served as the acting head of state of the Soviet Union after the deaths of Leonid Brezhnev (November 10, 1982, to June 16, 1983), Yuri Andropov (February 9 to April 11, 1984), and Konstantin Chernenko (March 10 to July 27, 1985); in Semyonov, Nizhny Novgorod Oblast, Russia (d. 1990)
  - Paul Lazarsfeld, Austrian-American sociologist, founder of the Bureau of Applied Social Research at Columbia University, created the two-step flow of communication model in social research, in Vienna (d. 1976)
  - Lewis Grassic Gibbon (pen name for James Leslie Mitchell), Scottish novelist (d. 1935)

== February 14, 1901 (Thursday) ==
- Giuseppe Zanardelli became the 16th Prime Minister of Italy.
- Martial law was declared in Madrid in order for the royal wedding between Princess Mercedes (the eldest daughter of King Alfonso) and Prince Carlos to commence.
- King Edward opened his first Parliament of the United Kingdom, appearing in person before both houses. The King insulted twelve million of his Roman Catholic subjects when he uttered the exact words of the Accession Declaration (a requirement for a new monarch's first opening of Parliament) for the first time since 1837, as required by the Act of Settlement. The words from 200 years earlier required the monarch to declare that "I do believe that... the invocation or adoration of the Virgin Mary or any other Saint, and the Sacrifice of the Mass, as they are now used in the Church of Rome, are superstitious and idolatrous". Irish M.P. John Redmond, himself a Roman Catholic, said afterward that the oath was "wantonly insulting" and warned that "as long as ... His Majesty swears that Roman Catholics are idolatrous, I, for one, will oppose His Majesty's salary." Redmond's fellow Irish members of the House of Commons voted against the King on civil matters afterward. The King subsequently made known his "disgust" with the wording and requested the government to revise the Declaration before any future monarch had to open Parliament, a change that would come about in the Accession Declaration Act on August 3, 1910, prior to the opening of Parliament by King George V.
- Born: Sylvia Field, American actress (d. 1998)

== February 15, 1901 (Friday) ==
- At about 11:00 in the morning, 69 coal miners at the Wellington Colliery Company, near Cumberland, British Columbia, were killed in an explosion. More than half of the fatalities (37 Chinese and nine Japanese) were Asian, and the other 27 were white. In the aftermath, the white miners who lived at nearby Nanaimo blamed the Chinese workers, and signed petitions protesting that the foreign-born workers were "dangerously incompetent" and demanded that all employees take a test to show their proficiency in either English or French. Soon afterward, calls were made for excluding all Asian immigrants from British Columbia, and James H. Hawthornthwaite would win a by-election to the provincial legislature to champion the anti-Asian cause.
- The Right-of-Way Act was signed into law by U.S. President William McKinley and permitted the United States Secretary of the Interior to grant rights of way through any federally owned-land, including the Indian reservations and the four national parks then in existence (Yellowstone, Sequoia, Yosemite, and Mount Rainier), the sole standard being whether it was "incompatible with the public interest". A conservationist would write later, "The act was in most respects perfectly tailored for looters of the parks, for it authorized the Secretary to grant rights of way... for practically any sort of business that might want a right of way."
- The Alianza Lima football team was founded in Peru.
- Born: João Branco Núncio, Portuguese bullfighter, in Alcácer do Sal, Portugal (d. 1976)
- Died: Karl G. Maeser, 73, German-American academic, immigrant who was the first principal of the Brigham Young Academy and considered to be the founder of Brigham Young University (b. 1828)

== February 16, 1901 (Saturday) ==
- At Saint Petersburg, Russian Foreign Minister Vladimir Lamsdorf presented a revised treaty proposal to China's Ambassador to the Russian Empire, Prince Yang-ju. Under the 12-article treaty, China would retain ownership of Manchuria, but Russian troops would be allowed to occupy the territory to guard the railways there, and China would be forbidden from granting rail or mining privileges to anyone without Russian consent. The Chinese then "decided to try their hand at balance-of-power politics", leaking various versions of the treaties to the Russian Empire's rivals, the Japanese and British Empires.
- After the United States raised the tariff on imported Russian sugar, Russia retaliated with a 30 percent increase on the tariff on American goods made of iron or steel.
- The town of South Hill, Virginia, was chartered, after having been laid out in 1889.
- Most of the members of both houses of the Alabama Legislature arrived in Pensacola, Florida, at the invitation of the West Florida Annexation Association, to discuss the possibility of the western portion of that state being annexed. There were enough interested legislators to fill six passenger cars on a specially chartered train. The plan envisioned by a committee was for Alabama to pay two million dollars to Florida to purchase Calhoun, Escambia, Holmes, Jackson, Santa Rosa, Walton and Washington Counties "if the rest of Florida and the Congress of the United States are willing, and if Governor Sanford of Alabama endorses the project, as do a majority of the Alabama legislators".
- Macedonian demonstrators in Sofia demanded independence for Bulgaria from the Ottoman Empire.

== February 17, 1901 (Sunday) ==
- William Knapp Thorn became the first person to drive a Mercedes automobile in a race, when he entered his recently purchased Daimler-Mercedes in the Circuit du Sud-Ouest that started at the French city of Pau. Only two kilometers in to the 330 kilometer race, Thorn's car flipped after a horse-drawn cart crossed into his path.
- Das klagende Lied, composed by Gustav Mahler in 1883 and then revised several times afterward, was performed for the very first time. Mahler himself conducted the Weiner choir and the Vienna Court Opera Orchestra at the Musikverein in Vienna, nearly 18 years after writing it.
- Carles Casagemas, 19, an art student and the best friend of artist Pablo Picasso, died by shooting himself in the head after being rejected in love. Picasso's "Blue Period" started, and for the next three years, Picasso, depressed at the loss of his friend, would paint his works in various shades of blue and blue-green.
- Born: Philotheus Boehner, German Franciscan priest and scholar, as Heinrich Boehner in Lichtenau, Westphalia, Germany (d. 1955)

== February 18, 1901 (Monday) ==
- Dr. Ronald Ross, in a letter to the colonial government in British India, became the first person to propose bringing malaria epidemics under control by extermination of mosquitoes of the genus Anopheles. In 1902, he would perfect the organization of the campaign against the Anopheles insects in a book Mosquito Brigades, and would receive the Nobel Prize in Physiology or Medicine later in that year.
- German Field Marshal Alfred von Waldersee announced that he would conduct new military campaigns to secure territory in China. In their first engagement at Paoting-fu (now Baoding), the Germans lost one soldier and killed 200 Chinese soldiers after a patrol allegedly came under attack.
- Four days after becoming a member of the House of Commons of the United Kingdom future Prime Minister Winston Churchill gave his maiden speech, a rebuttal to an address given by another future Prime Minister, David Lloyd George. At 10:30 when Lloyd George had finished an eloquent speech decrying the carnage against the Boers during the Second Boer War, Churchill responded that British policy should be "to make it easy and honourable for the Boers to surrender, and painful and perilous for them to continue in the field." Churchill would say later that "It was a terrible, thrilling yet delicious experience".
- Died: Gaëtan Henri Léon de Viaris, 54, French cryptanalyst who invented a printing cipher machine, and furthered the use of mathematical relations to cryptology, particularly linear substitutions.

== February 19, 1901 (Tuesday) ==
- Thomas O'Donnell, an Irish Nationalist member of the House of Commons of the United Kingdom, stunned his fellow members of parliament when he rose to speak, and then started to address the group in the Irish language. A representative for the constituency of West Kerry, began by saying, in Irish, "As an Irishman from an Irish-speaking constituency, a member of a nation which still preserves a language of its own and is still striving bravely for freedom..." before he was interrupted by the House Speaker, William Gully, who recognized what O'Donnell was doing. As O'Donnell's fellow Irish MPs applauded, Gully called for order and informed him that he was "not entitled to address the Commons in a language which they did not understand". O'Donnell then asked the Speaker, in Irish, "Is it not true that Irish is my native language, the language of my ancestors, the language of my country?" John Redmond then pointed out that there was "no written or unwritten rule against a member using the language which is most familiar to him", and Gully replied that there was no precedent for a member of Commons to give a speech in anything but English, and that "Not in the one hundred years of union has any Irishman tried to speak in Irish in this House until now." The next day, The Times of London commented that "Public gratitude is due to one ingenious Irish gentleman— Mr. Thomas O'Donnell, M.P., for West Kerry, for relaxing the severity of the Parliamentary situation last night" during a bitter debate over the Second Boer War.
- After criticizing General Carrington in print, the Rhodesian Times was seized by British authorities under martial law and the staff was evicted.
- Born: Florence Green, last surviving World War I veteran, as a member of the Women's Royal Air Force; in Edmonton, London, England (d. 2012)
- Died: Paul Armand Silvestre, 63, French poet

== February 20, 1901 (Wednesday) ==
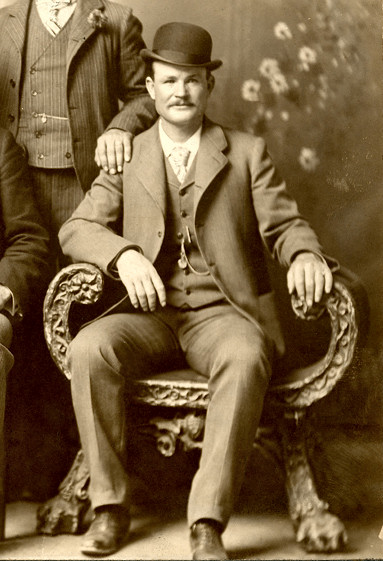
Butch Cassidy

The Sundance Kid and Etta Place

- Butch Cassidy (Robert Leroy Parker) and the Sundance Kid (Harry Longabaugh), and their companion Etta Place, departed the United States on board the SS Herminius and never returned. Wanted for the robberies committed by Parker's gang, The Wild Bunch, the three traveled on the British steamer to Buenos Aires, Argentina. They would return briefly in 1906, when Place wanted to go home, but Parker and Longabaugh would go back to South America after escorting her to California.
- The Hawaii Territorial Legislature convened for the first time. Joseph Apukai Akina, a Hawaiian-Chinese representative from the island of Kauai was chosen as the first Speaker of the state House of Representatives, and Dr. Nicholas Roosevelt, a white settler on the big island, was elected President of the state Senate.
- Born:
  - Henry Eyring, American theoretical chemist, developed the transition state theory for which he won the National Medal of Science (1960) and the Wolf Prize in Chemistry (1980), but who was bypassed for the Nobel Prize in Chemistry, in the Mormon colony in Colonia Juárez, Chihuahua, Mexico (d. 1981)
  - René Dubos, French-American microbiologist and environmentalist, known for popularizing the maxim "Think globally, act locally", in Saint-Brice-sous-Forêt, France (d. 1982)
  - Mohamed Naguib, Egyptian state leader, 1st President of Egypt, in Khartoum, Anglo-Egyptian Sudan (d. 1984)

== February 21, 1901 (Thursday) ==
- At the insistence of the United States, the Eight-Nation Alliance occupying China agreed that none of their nations would acquire any additional Chinese territory without the approval of the others. Count Alfred von Waldersee called off his intended expedition the following day.
- China's Imperial government began turning over the North China Railway to British control.
- In Zürich, German-born physicist Albert Einstein became a citizen of Switzerland. In 1922, the Swiss legation to Berlin would respond to an inquiry and notify Germany's Federal Foreign Office that Einstein had renounced his German citizenship.
- Scottish clergyman and amateur astronomer Thomas David Anderson became the first person to notice the nova GK Persei. By February 23, it was the brightest star in the sky, reaching zero magnitude, but faded to 4th magnitude by March 15, and to a 7 by year's end. Photographs taken from Harvard University of the constellation Perseus on February 19 did not show GK Persei among stars as dim as the 11th magnitude, indicating that its explosion had been very rapid, increasing by at least eight magnitudes within 48 hours. Later identified as being 1,533 light years from Earth, GK Persei had apparently exploded in the year 367 AD.
- Delegates in Havana signed the final version of the new Constitution for Cuba, in preparation from its transition from a United States possession to a quasi-independent republic under American protection.
- By a margin of 26 to 37, the United States Senate defeated a measure that would have provided funds for post offices to create pneumatic tube delivery systems in American cities. The vote was on a proposed amendment to the post office appropriation bill that would have budgeted $500,000 toward the technology. Besides stopping the expansion of the service, the vote also meant that the pneumatic tube systems operating in New York City, Brooklyn, Boston and Philadelphia would halt at the end of the fiscal year on June 30.

== February 22, 1901 (Friday) ==
- As General Christiaan de Wet led a force of 5,000 Boers toward Prieska, General John French of the British Army intercepted the group and forced them to retreat.
- A breakthrough in food preservation was demonstrated by a Dr. Von Olden in Copenhagen, who showed potential investors proof that he had sealed a container of butter a year earlier, in front of a notary public, and then opened it in front of dairymen, who found it to be untainted. News of the Von Olden Process would soon go outside of Denmark, and the Associated Press would cable the report to American readers on March 25. Soon afterward, Dr. Von Olden was exposed as a con man whose real name was Christianson; after the notary had certified that the container had been sealed in his presence "on February 22, 1901", Christianson carefully altered the 1901 to "1900".
- The City of Rio de Janeiro, a passenger liner operated by the Pacific Mail Steamship Company, struck a reef as it was entering San Francisco Bay on its way through a dense fog as it was arriving from Honolulu, and sank within 20 minutes. Of the 208 people on board, 131 drowned. The sinking happened so quickly that lifeboats that could not be lowered in time went down with the ship, along with the people inside the boats. Other people jumped overboard as the ship steamer went down and were pulled down by the suction of the sinking vessel.
- Born:
  - Mildred Davis, American silent film actress who later married her leading man, Harold Lloyd, in Philadelphia (d. 1969)
  - Stefan Lorant, Hungarian-American filmmaker and photojournalist, in Budapest (d. 1997)
- Died:
  - George Francis FitzGerald, 50, Irish physicist and mathematician, known for the Length contraction, following exploratory surgery for a perforated ulcer (b. 1851)
  - Laura Matilda Towne, 75, American educator and abolitionist who founded the first freedmen's schools for the education of newly freed slaves (b. 1825)
  - Rounsevelle Wildman, 37, American consul-general to Hong Kong, along with his family, in the sinking of the Rio de Janeiro

== February 23, 1901 (Saturday) ==
- In a battle at Disselfontein in South Africa, the fleeing Boer troops commanded by General Christiaan de Wet were overtaken by British forces under Colonel Herbert Plumer. De Wet escaped, but 50 of his men were taken prisoner.
- The United Kingdom and Germany agreed on the boundary between their African colonies, setting a line running between Lake Nyasa to Lake Tanganyika. At the time, Malawi was known as the British protectorate of Nyasaland, while Tanzania was part of German East Africa.
- The United States Senate approved a $5,000,000 budget toward the Louisiana Purchase Exposition to open in St. Louis for 1904, conditioned upon that world's fair being closed on Sundays. The budget proposal had passed the House, 191–41, on February 17, without the Sunday closing requirement.
- Born:
  - Federico Chabod, Italian historian, in Aosta, Italy (d. 1960)
  - Ivar Lo-Johansson, Swedish writer, in Ösmo, Sweden (d. 1990)

== February 24, 1901 (Sunday) ==
- After 53 ballots without any single candidate attaining a majority, the legislature of Oregon elected former Senator John H. Mitchell to be one of its two United States Senators.
- Given a choice between committing suicide or being put to death, former Imperial Chinese officials Ying Lien and Chao Shu Chao chose the former, cutting their throats in the presence of the Governor of Shaanxi province.

== February 25, 1901 (Monday) ==
U.S. Steel

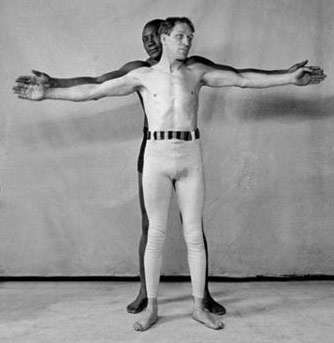
Johnson and Choynski

- Marcelo Azcárraga Palmero resigned as Prime Minister of Spain, along with his entire cabinet, after he declared that the group "regarded the mission for which it took office being accomplished by the marriage of the Infanta Maria de las Mercedes to Prince Charles of Bourbon".
- George M. Cohan's first Broadway show, The Governor's Son (starring the Four Cohans), opened, but would close after a month because of a disastrous first night in front of the critics.
- U.S. Steel was incorporated in New Jersey by industrialist J. P. Morgan, as the first billion-dollar corporation, with total capital valued at more than $1,400,000,000.
- The town of Buhl, Minnesota (motto "The Finest Water in America") was incorporated.
- Professional boxers Jack Johnson and Joe Choynski fought a bout inside Harmony Hall in Galveston, Texas, and were both arrested after Choynski knocked out Johnson in the third round, for violating the state law against fighting for professional gain. The arrest would prove to be a big break for Johnson, an African-American rookie; he and Choynski, a white 33-year-old boxer described as "the first Jewish American athlete to rise to international repute", shared a jail cell for the next 24 days, during which "Choynski taught Johnson the defensive style that he would perfect during his career". The two men were freed after a grand jury declined to indict them, and Johnson would go on to become the world heavyweight boxing champion.
- After again posting bail and being released from jail, Carrie Nation set off on another destructive raid on a saloon. During the fracas, a Topeka, Kansas citizen was shot and seriously wounded.
- Thirty-two miners at the Diamondville Coal and Coke Company, in Diamondville, Wyoming, were killed in a fire in a mine shaft.
- Arizona's territorial Capitol Building, which would continue as the state capitol building when Arizona became a state in 1912, was dedicated in Phoenix.
- Born:
  - Vince Gair, Australian politician, 27th Premier of Queensland, Chairman of the Democratic Labor Party (d. 1980)
  - Zeppo Marx (Herbert Manfred Marx), American comedian, one of the Marx Brothers, in New York City (d. 1979)

== February 26, 1901 (Tuesday) ==
- Chi-hsui and Hsu-cheng-yu, Boxer Rebellion leaders, were publicly beheaded in Beijing in front of a crowd of about 10,000. The two had been in the custody of the Japanese Army and were remanded to China's "Board of Punishments" for the executions. According to Lieutenant Colonel Goro Shiba, the Japanese legation's military attaché, he treated the two condemned men to champagne, and Chi-hsui told him "I do not know what I have done to make me deserving of death, but if beheading me will make the foreign troops evacuate Peking and my Emperor return, I am satisfied to die. I will die a patriot."
- Reports from Bombay (now Mumbai) in British India showed that 400 people had died in a plague epidemic in just two days.
- Figures from the latest census of the German Empire were released from Berlin. As of December 1, 1900, the German population was 56,345,014 "of which number 27,731,067 were males". The growth rate of 7.70% in five years was the highest increase in 30 years.
- Died: Lucyna Ćwierczakiewiczowa, 82, Polish writer (b. 1829)

== February 27, 1901 (Wednesday) ==
- Nikolay Bogolepov, the Russian Minister of Public Instruction, was shot and mortally wounded by a student who had recently been expelled from a university. Bogolepov, wounded in the neck by a revolver, would survive for more than two weeks before succumbing on March 15.
- The Sultan of the Ottoman Empire ordered 50,000 troops to the Bulgarian frontier because of unrest in Macedonia.
- German chemist Wilhelm Normann applied for the patent on his new discovery, the creation of the first trans fatty acids through the hydrogenation of the oleic acid in vegetable oil, using hydrogen and a nickel-based catalyst, from liquid into a solid stearic acid. German patent No. 141,029 ("Process for the conversion of unsaturated fatty acids or their glycerides into saturated compounds"), for what Normann called Fetthärtung (fat hardening), was made effective August 14, 1902. The first trans-fat product, Crisco shortening, would be introduced to the public in 1911.
- The threat of an attack on Britain's Cape Colony by 2,500 Orange Free State troops was ended after heavy rains and Lord Kitchener's defense forced Generals Christiaan de Wet and J. B. M. Hertzog to order a retreat.
- In the United Kingdom, the cost of the nation's continued involvement in the Second Boer War was estimated to have reached $650,000,000.
- National League owners approved a change in the hit by pitch rule, and as an author would note later, "Baseball's intelligentsia had not thought this one through". Passed in order to stop batters from stepping in to the path of a ball in order to take a base, the new rule provided that a blow to the body would be called as a ball. Theoretically, a pitcher could deliberately hit a batter four times before the batter could take a base; the owners reversed themselves on the morning of the opening day of the season. One rule change, which would still be in place more than a century later, was to provide that "the first and second foul balls hit by the batsman, unless two strikes have already been called against him, shall henceforth be counted as strikes".
- At the same meeting in New York City, the National League dropped its sponsorship for a planned American Association minor league with teams in six of the eight American League locations and waited until the end of the day to inform league organizers Charles Power and W. H. Watkins of their decision. By the two men did get to make their presentation for the AA, "most of its members had left for home". However, the owners of the Indianapolis; Louisville, Kentucky; and Milwaukee franchises would organize a new American Association in 1902 with teams in the Midwest, and it would quickly become one of the strongest of the minor leagues, with the same eight teams for more than 50 years.
- Alabama became the first American state to create a cabinet level department devoted to historical preservation, with the creation of its Department of Archives and History.
- The United States Court of Appeals ruled against the Bell Telephone Company in the patent infringement case filed by Emile Berliner.
- Born: Horatio Luro, Argentine horse trainer and honoree of the National Museum of Racing and Hall of Fame (d. 1991)
- Died: James Huddart, 54, British ship builder (b. 1847)

== February 28, 1901 (Thursday) ==
- At 10:00 in the morning, peace negotiations began between Lord Kitchener and the Boers' General Louis Botha at Middelburg, located within a British-occupied section of the Boers' South African Republic. General Botha's initial condition, the continued independence of the South Africa and the Orange Free State under Boer rule, was rejected immediately, and Botha's second peace proposal had ten conditions, including Afrikaans and English being the official language, that British insistence for black African voting rights be deferred, that the Dutch Church retain its property, that the United Kingdom assume the Boer republic's war debts, an amnesty for everyone and a release of prisoners, financial aid for farmers whose land was ruined by the British invasion, and that the Boers be allowed to retain rifles for protection from the black African natives. After the talks failed, the Second Boer War continued and Kitchener continued the conquest of the Boers, including burning farms and placing prisoners of war into concentration camps.
- Major P. B. Molesworth, a British astronomer and member of the Royal Engineers first observed the South Tropical Disturbance on the same latitude as the Great Red Spot on the planet Jupiter, but with a shorter rotation period that periodically brought the two in conjunction. Molesworth, who had been born in the island colony of British Ceylon (now Sri Lanka), had made the discovery from the telescope at the Trincomalee observatory; the disturbance on Jupiter would continue for more than 38 years, and would last be observed in 1939.
- The United States Congress rejected the proposed agreement that had been signed by the United States Department of the Interior with the Choctaw and Chickasaw nations, and negotiations had to begin again.
- The United States Army Nurse Corps, created on February 2, was formally organized with 202 nurses as charter members.
- Born: Linus Pauling, American chemist, recipient of the Nobel Prize in Chemistry in 1954 and the Nobel Peace Prize in 1962, in Portland, Oregon (d. 1994)
- Died: Hilary R. W. Johnson, 63, Liberian state leader, 11th President of Liberia (b. 1837)
