= Grandi =

Grandi is an Italian surname. Notable people with the surname include:

- Achille Grandi (1883-1946), Italian catholic syndicalist
- Alberto Grandi (born 1967), Italian historian
- Alessandro Grandi (1586–1630), Italian composer
- Allegro Grandi (1910–1973), Italian cyclist
- Bruno Grandi (1934–2019), Italian gymnast
- Daniele Grandi (born 1993), Italian footballer
- Dino Grandi (1895–1988), Italian politician
- Ercole Grandi (1491–1531), Italian painter
- Filippo Grandi (born 1957), Italian diplomat
- Giuseppe Grandi (1843–1894), Italian sculptor
- Guido Grandi (priest) (1671–1742), Italian priest and mathematician
- Guido Grandi (entomologist) (1886–1970), Italian entomologist
- Irene Grandi (1969), Italian singer
- Luigi Guido Grandi (1671–1742), Italian monk, priest, philosopher, theologian, mathematician, and engineer
- Margherita Grandi (Margaret Gard) (1892–1971), Australian soprano
- Marta Grandi (1915–2005), Italian entomologist
- Matteo Grandi (born 1992), Italian footballer
- Serena Grandi (1958), Italian actress
- Stefano Grandi (born 1962), Italian swimmer
- Thomas Grandi (1972), Canadian alpine skier

== Fictional characters ==
- Kari Grandi, protagonist in the Finnish television advertisements for Grandi juice brand

== See also ==
- Benigno De Grandi (1924-2014), Italian professional football player and manager
- Il Kal grandi, place of worship of the Sephardi community in Sarajevo, Bosnia
- Grandi's series, a certain infinite mathematical series (after Guido Grandi)
- Grandi non immerito, papal bull issued by Pope Innocent IV on 24 July 1245
- Ospedali Grandi (also Ospedali Maggiori), four former grand Venetian hospitals
- HB Grandi, Icelandic fishing company
- Grandis (disambiguation)
- Grandi (juice), a Finnish brand of juice
