= Mantere =

Mantere is a Finnish surname. Notable people with the surname include:

- Eeki Mantere (1949–2007), Finnish musician
- Oskari Mantere (1874–1942), Finnish politician
