= Grandis (surname) =

The surname Grandis may refer to:

- David Grandis, a French conductor
- Jocelyn de Grandis (born 1980), a French Olympic archer
- Renato de Grandis (1927–2008), an Italian composer, musicologist, and writer

== See also ==
- Grandis (disambiguation)
