= W. grandis =

W. grandis may refer to:

- Walckenaeria grandis, a spider species in the genus Walckenaeria found in the Azores
- Wellnhoferia grandis, an early prehistoric bird species found in Germany that lived during the Late Jurassic

== See also ==
- Grandis (disambiguation)
