= 332 BC =

332 BC in various calendars
Gregorian calendar	332 BC; CCCXXXII BC
Ab urbe condita	422
Ancient Egypt era	XXXII dynasty, 1
Pharaoh	Alexander the Great, 1
Ancient Greek Olympiad (summer)	112th Olympiad (victor)¹
Assyrian calendar	4419
Balinese saka calendar	N/A
Bengali calendar	−925 – −924
Berber calendar	619
Buddhist calendar	213
Burmese calendar	−969
Byzantine calendar	5177–5178
Chinese calendar	戊子年 (Earth Rat); 2366 or 2159 — to — 己丑年 (Earth Ox); 2367 or 2160
Coptic calendar	−615 – −614
Discordian calendar	835
Ethiopian calendar	−339 – −338
Hebrew calendar	3429–3430
- Hindu calendars
Vikram Samvat	−275 – −274
Shaka Samvat	N/A
Kali Yuga	2769–2770
Holocene calendar	9669
Iranian calendar	953 BP – 952 BP
Islamic calendar	982 BH – 981 BH
Javanese calendar	N/A
Julian calendar	N/A
Korean calendar	2002
Minguo calendar	2243 before ROC 民前2243年
Nanakshahi calendar	−1799
Thai solar calendar	211–212
Tibetan calendar	ས་ཕོ་བྱི་བ་ལོ་ (male Earth-Rat) −205 or −586 or −1358 — to — ས་མོ་གླང་ལོ་ (female Earth-Ox) −204 or −585 or −1357

Year 332 BCE was a year of the pre-Julian Roman calendar. At the time, it was known as the Year of the Consulship of Calvinus and Arvina (or, less frequently, year 422 Ab urbe condita). The denomination 332 BC for this year has been used since the early medieval period, when the Anno Domini calendar era became the prevalent method in Europe for naming years.

== Events ==
=== By place ===
==== Persian Empire ====
- The Persian King Darius III twice sends on horseback to Alexander letters of friendship. The second time he offers a large ransom for his family, the ceding of all of the Persian Empire west of the Euphrates River, and the hand of his daughter in return for an alliance. Alexander rejects both letters and marches into Mesopotamia.
- At the acropolis in Susa, an unidentified woman is buried in a bronze sarcophagus, wearing "a mass of finely-wrought and artistic gems and jewels" and two coins, one dating from 350 BC and the other from 332 BC. The tomb will remain unopened for more than 22 centuries, until French archaeologist Jacques de Morgan unearths it on February 10, 1901.

==== Macedonia ====
- Alexander the Great occupies Damascus and, after a siege lasting seven months, destroys Tyre during which there is great carnage and the sale of the women and children into slavery.
- Leaving Parmenion in Syria, Alexander advances south without opposition until he reaches Gaza where bitter resistance halts him for two months, and he sustains a serious shoulder wound during a sortie.
- Alexander conquers Egypt from the Persians. The Egyptians welcome him as their deliverer, and the Persian satrap Mazaces wisely surrenders. Alexander's conquest of Egypt completes his control of the whole eastern Mediterranean coast.
- November 14 – Alexander is crowned as pharaoh of Upper and Lower Egypt – god and king all at once – son of Ra and Osiris, Horus the "Golden One" and beloved of Amun.
- Alexander spends the winter organizing the administration of Egypt. He employs Egyptian governors, while keeping the army under a separate Macedonian command.
- Alexander founds the city of Alexandria near the western arm of the Nile on a site between the sea and Lake Mareotis, protected by the island of Pharos, and has the city laid out by the Rhodian architect Deinocrates.

==== Italy ====
- After a victory over the Samnites and Lucanians near Paestum, Alexander of Epirus makes a treaty with the Romans.
