= 367 =

367 in various calendars
- Gregorian calendar: 367; CCCLXVII
- Ab urbe condita: 1120
- Assyrian calendar: 5117
- Balinese saka calendar: 288–289
- Bengali calendar: −227 – −226
- Berber calendar: 1317
- Buddhist calendar: 911
- Burmese calendar: −271
- Byzantine calendar: 5875–5876
- Chinese calendar: 丙寅年 (Fire Tiger); 3064 or 2857 — to — 丁卯年 (Fire Rabbit); 3065 or 2858
- Coptic calendar: 83–84
- Discordian calendar: 1533
- Ethiopian calendar: 359–360
- Hebrew calendar: 4127–4128
- Hindu calendars
- Vikram Samvat: 423–424
- Shaka Samvat: 288–289
- Kali Yuga: 3467–3468
- Holocene calendar: 10367
- Iranian calendar: 255 BP – 254 BP
- Islamic calendar: 263 BH – 262 BH
- Javanese calendar: 249–250
- Julian calendar: 367; CCCLXVII
- Korean calendar: 2700
- Minguo calendar: 1545 before ROC 民前1545年
- Nanakshahi calendar: −1101
- Seleucid era: 678/679 AG
- Thai solar calendar: 909–910
- Tibetan calendar: མེ་ཕོ་སྟག་ལོ་ (male Fire-Tiger); 493 or 112 or −660 — to — མེ་མོ་ཡོས་ལོ་ (female Fire-Hare); 494 or 113 or −659

Year 367 (CCCLXVII) was a common year starting on Monday of the Julian calendar. At the time, it was known as the Year of the Consulship of Lupicinus and Iovanus (or, less frequently, year 1120 Ab urbe condita). The denomination 367 for this year has been used since the early medieval period, when the Anno Domini calendar era became the prevalent method in Europe for naming years.

== Events ==
=== By place ===
==== Roman Empire ====
- Battle of Solicinium: Emperor Valentinian I launches a punitive expedition against the Alamanni, due to the crises in Britannia and Gaul. The Alamanni re-cross the Rhine and plunder Moguntiacum (modern Mainz).
- Valentinian I declares that Christians will not be forced into gladiator training schools.
- Great Conspiracy: The Roman garrison on Hadrian's Wall revolts and allows Picts from Caledonia to devastate Britain. Simultaneously Attacotti, the Scotti from Hibernia (Ireland), and the Saxons from Germania invade the island's mid-western and south-eastern borders. They sack the cities and murder, rape or enslave Romano-British civilians.
- Eunomius of Cyzicus is banished to Mauretania for harbouring the usurper Procopius.
- August 4 – Gratian receives the title of Augustus under his father, Valentinian I.
- Winter – Valentinian I mobilises a massive army for his campaign against the Alamanni and the Franks. He summons the Italian and Illyrian legions for a spring offensive.

==== Asia ====
- The first Korean envoy arrives in Japan, emissary of the government of Kudara.

=== By topic ===
==== Religion ====
- The first Listing of the New Testament (Bible) is made by St. Athanasius of Alexandria.
- November 16 – Antipope Ursicinus is banished by the praefecti to Gaul.
- Epiphanius of Salamis becomes bishop of Salamis, Cyprus.
- Emperor Valens is baptized by Eudoxius of Antioch.

==== Science ====
- In the region of the constellation Perseus, a star not visible to the naked eye, and 1,533 light years distant from Earth, explodes in a nova. The light from the star, now called GK Persei, was first detected on Earth on February 21, 1901.

== Deaths ==
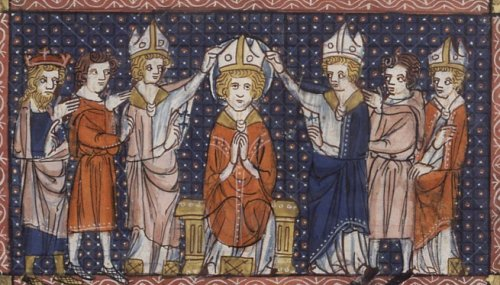
Saint Hilary of Poitiers

- January 13 – Hilary of Poitiers, Byzantine bishop, Doctor of the Church and saint (b. c. 315)

=== Date unknown ===
- Murong Ke, Chinese general and statesman of Former Yan
- Yang Wu (or Shiqiu), Chinese official, general and regent
