= N. grandis =

N. grandis may refer to:

- Nyctibius grandis, the great potoo, a bird species found in tropical America
- Niltava grandis, the large niltava, a bird species found in Asia

== See also ==
- Grandis (disambiguation)
