= Romano-tv =

2007 Finnish television series

Romano-tv (previously Manne-tv) is a twelve-episode sketch-show based on common stereotypes and misconceptions the Finns have of the domestic Romani minority. It ran from June 2 to August 18, 2007 on Yle.

The show was propelled by the excitable performances of Santeri Ahlgren and Eeki Mantere (who died in April 2007, just before the shooting of the show) as well as through the support of the Finnish celebrity and musician Remu Aaltonen of Hurriganes (who himself is a member of the Finnish Romani community). The show's builds on the tradition of such extreme low-budget sketch-shows as Pulttibois and Kummeli by adding a comical effect through a more intentional approach. This is manifested by blooper-shots being shown within the episode rather than at the end of each program.

The show attracted wide criticism when it first aired and up until the 14th of July the show ran under the title Manne-tv after which Yleisradio had the name changed to the more neutral Romano-tv. Some groups found the use of the term manne (a Finnish racial slur referring to Romani people) offensive or inappropriate despite the usage of the term in the show in a tongue-in-cheek connotation. Despite the change in name the fake commercial bumpers and characters in the show still referred to the show as Manne-tv even after the official switch.

Despite the controversy the show also enjoyed a slew of popular guest stars.
