= Marli =

Finnish fruit juice brand

Eckes-Granini Finland Oy Ab (until 2009 Oy Marli Ab) is a Finnish food company owned by the German Eckes-Granini Group GmbH. The company’s turnover is about 58 million euros, and it has about 130 employees, over 150 during summertime. The company’s head office and factory are located in Turku. The company manufactures and sells more than 150 products. Its best-known brands are Juissi, Marli, Mehukatti, Trip, and Tropic.

== History ==
Marli’s history begins with the wine and liqueur factory founded in Turku in 1867 by Anders Nordfors. The production of wines and liqueurs was suspended during Prohibition, which came into force in 1919, whereupon the factory began producing juices and other non-alcoholic beverages. In 1954, Huhtamäki-Yhtymä Oy bought Nordfors's factory and merged it with the Marli Berry Wine and Liqueur Factory (formerly O/Y Marvi A/B), which it had previously acquired.

In 1992, Huhtamäki sold Marli to Oy Rettig Ab and, in exchange, received from Rettig the Merijal and Seres confectionery factories it owned. Rettig had bought these factories in the 1970s.

In 1999, the Lappeenranta-based Chymos Juomat Oy was merged with Marli. The following year, Marli was split into two companies: Oy Marli Ab, which produced juices, and a company engaged in alcohol-related business.

Rettig sold Marli to Eckes-Granini in 2001 and sold the alcohol business to the Swedish V&S Vin & Sprit AB definitively in 2002. In Finland, the latter operations are continued by Pernod Ricard Finland Oy.
