= Lionel White =

American novelist

- Born: July 9, 1905; New York City, New York, U.S.
- Died: December 26, 1985 (aged 80); Asheville, North Carolina, U.S.
- Occupations: Journalist, novelist
- Writing career
- Genres: Crime fiction, journalism

Lionel White (9 July 1905 – 26 December 1985) was an American journalist and crime novelist. Several of his dark, noirish stories were made into films. Also known as L.W. Blanco, White had been a crime reporter and began writing suspense novels in the 1950s. His more than 35 books were all translated into several languages. His earlier novels were published as Gold Medal crime fiction, but when E. P. Dutton began a line of mystery and suspense books, he also wrote for them. He was best known as what a New York Times review called "the master of the big caper."

White's novels included Clean Break (adapted by Stanley Kubrick as the basis for his 1956 film The Killing), Obsession (adapted by Jean-Luc Godard as the basis for his 1965 film Pierrot le fou and by the Finnish director Seppo Huunonen for the 1974 film The Hair), The Money Trap (made into a 1965 movie by Burt Kennedy starring Glenn Ford and Elke Sommer), The Snatchers (made into a 1969 film as The Night of the Following Day directed by Hubert Cornfield and starring Marlon Brando), and Rafferty, adapted by 1980 Soviet Lenfilm production of the same title. Seven years after White's death, director Quentin Tarantino credited him, among others, as an inspiration in his 1992 film Reservoir Dogs.

== Novels ==
- Seven Hungry Men! (1952) (reprinted as Run, Killer, Run! with a modified ending in 1959)
- The Snatchers (1953) (filmed in 1968 as The Night of the Following Day)
- To Find a Killer (also released as Before I Die) (1954)
- The Big Caper (1955) (filmed in 1957 under the same title)
- Clean Break (1955) (filmed in 1955 as The Killing)
- Flight into Terror (1955)
- Love Trap (1955)
- Operation - Murder (1956)
- The House Next Door (1956)
- Death Takes the Bus (1957)
- Hostage for a Hood (1957)
- Coffin for a Hood (1958)
- Invitation to Violence (1958)
- Too Young to Die (1958)
- Rafferty (Soviet filmed in 1980 under the same title)
- The Merriweather File (1959) (televised in 1961 under the same name as an episode of Thriller)
- Steal Big (1960)
- Lament for a Virgin (1960)
- Marilyn K. (1960)
- The Time of Terror (1960)
- A Death at Sea (1961)
- A Grave Undertaking (1961)
- Obsession (1962) (filmed in 1965 as Pierrot le Fou, without credit; also filmed in 1974 as Karvat)
- The Money Trap (1963) (filmed in 1965 under the same title)
- The Ransomed Madonna (1964)
- The House on K Street (1965) (not historical fiction but a murder mystery; title references political corruption in general)
- A Party to Murder (1966)
- The Mind Poisoners (1966) (Killmaster novel begun under the Nick Carter pseudonym; Valerie Moolman took over and finished the novel)
- The Crimshaw Memorandum (1967)
- The Night of the Rape (1967)
- Hijack (1969)
- Death of a City (1970)
- A Rich and Dangerous Game (1974)
- The Mexico Run (1974)
- Jailbreak (1976)
- The Walled Yard (1978)
