= The Hair (film) =

- Original Finnish film poster.
- Directed by: Seppo Huunonen
- Written by: Seppo Huunonen
- Based on: Obsession; 1962 novel by Lionel White
- Produced by: Seppo Huunonen
- Starring: Mikko Majanlahti; Arja Virtanen
- Cinematography: Kari Sohlberg
- Edited by: Erkki Seiro; Kristina Schulgin
- Music by: Paroni Paakkunainen; Jorma Panula
- Production company: Eloseppo Oy
- Release date: 26 July 1974
- Running time: 104 minutes
- Country: Finland
- Languages: Finnish, Spanish

The Hair (Finnish: Karvat) is a 1974 Finnish erotic dark comedy thriller film written, produced and directed by Seppo Huunonen. It was loosely based on Lionel White's 1962 suspense novel Obsession, like Jean-Luc Godard's 1965 French film Pierrot le Fou. It tells the story of a middle-aged man who becomes deeply involved with the affairs and criminal connections of a mysterious girl. The main roles are played by Mikko Majanlahti and dancer Arja Virtanen, of which The Hair was the actress's only film. Virtanen's voice has been replaced by the voice of the actress Tiia Louste.

The Hair has generally been called "the worst Finnish film ever made". It was one of the films that premiered in a year known as the trough of Finnish film production, being one of the least viewed Finnish films ever. In addition, it is also the second Finnish film, after Teuvo Tulio's Sensuela, that was rated 18 by the Finnish Board of Film Classification. According to Yle, only two Finnish feature films were completed in 1974: The Hair and Viu-hah hah-taja.

Critics were scathing in their reviews about the film. Eeva Järvenpää from Helsingin Sanomat summed up her assessment: “The Hair is trying to offer sex and humor, a show and momentum, violence and drama. In all of this, it fails miserably.” Timo Malmi from Ilta-Sanomat considers the film to be one of the "worst Finnish films ever" and in his assessment calls the film's “plot so confusing and tense that its progression is not even interesting, and the "alternative" fantasy ending does not make the viewing experience any easier.” In connection with the 2011 DVD release, Janne Rosenqvist from Film-o-Holic site found something positive in the film as well: “At its best, The Hair offers smooth physical black comedy spiced with jazz, but the outright obsession with experimentation is too much of a burden.”

== Plot ==
Pekka Halme is a 37-year-old unemployed man who has failed as both a writer and a family man: his children do not like him and his wife does not understand him. One winter evening, Pekka goes to a party with his wife and the Melanen couple. The couple hires a girl named Maria Virkola to be their babysitter. Pekka does not enjoy the party and also orders his wife, who is flirting with a young poet, to leave. At his wife's request, Pekka drives Maria home: the girl asks him out for a drink and they end up in bed together.

In the morning, Pekka wakes up next to Maria and, to his horror, finds a man's dead body in the living room of the apartment. He wants to call the police, but listens to Maria's explanation: Pekka's wife had been in the night and left immediately after seeing the man in bed; shortly after this, the owner of the apartment, Donovan, came in, who, out of jealousy, had intended to kill Pekka, but Maria had managed to do it first. When Pekka still does not want to escape and pleads that he has no money, Maria shows him a briefcase full of hundred-mark notes. Eero Melanen appears at the apartment with his own keys, sees the money and finds the body: Maria beats him unconscious with an iron and intends to kill him, but Pekka prevents it.

Pekka and Maria escape by flying to Málaga and obtaining fake passports under the names Erik and Leena Ertamo. They change their appearance with wigs and pose as a married couple who have received an inheritance and want to settle in Spain and are looking for an apartment. They rent a nice house, live the sweet life, making love and partying. Soon Pekka finds a man's body in the trunk of the car: Maria explains the incident as a runover. Maria starts to get bored, hits an Arab man on the beach and sleeps with him. Their car is stolen and is found crushed in the mountains, with the presumed driver dead next to him. Pekka would like to wait for the car's insurance money, because in two months their loot will have dwindled, but Maria persuades the man to return with her to Finland, where she says her brother will help them.

Back in Finland, they stay at a motel and end up at a restaurant where the pianist is an old acquaintance of Maria's. Maria promises to take care of the matter and sends Pekka to the motel ready to go. She calls Pekka and asks him to come to the address where Pekka finds the pianist murdered. The gangsters, led by their female boss Kamrakas, surprise Pekka and torture him to find out Maria's whereabouts, but are forced to leave in vain. The badly injured Pekka drives off the road, but manages to escape from the car before it catches fire.

After recovering, Pekka remembers Maria's brother and travels to Oulu. He finds Maria in a nightclub and meets her "brother" Manu, who forces Pekka to join him in a three million mark robbery. Manu meets Kamrakas in the office of the restaurant and receives a briefcase from her. Disguised as a waiter, Pekka brings a gun in an ice bowl, with which Manu shoots the woman, takes the rest of the money, knocks Pekka unconscious and frames him as the culprit. The police arrive, but with the help of a "super nut" Pekka manages to escape and flies a small plane to Maria and Manu's hideout on the countryside. He shoots Manu, takes Maria by force and strangles her. Finally, he collects the money in a briefcase, winks at the viewer and leaves.

== Cast ==
- Mikko Majanlahti as Pekka Halme
- Arja Virtanen as Maria Virkola
- Pauli Virtanen as Eero Melanen
- Eeki Mantere as Kala Korpela
- Eeva Varjonen as Marjatta Halme
- Ari Määttänen as Manu
- Krista Sihvo as Kamrakas
