= Roger Dutoit =

French actor (1923–1988)

- Born: 8 February 1923; Calais, France
- Died: 3 May 1988 (aged 65); Silly, Belgium
- Occupation: Actor
- Years active: 1955–1982

Roger Dutoit (8 February 1923 – 3 May 1988) was a French film actor. He appeared in more than thirty films from 1955 to 1982.

== Filmography ==
Film
Year	Title	Role	Notes
1955	Un Soir de Joie	Raymond	
1955	Lola Montès	Seaman	Uncredited
1956	Le toubib, médecin du gang	L'inspecteur Martin	
1960	Marche ou crève	Ansaldo	
1962	Emile's Boat	Patron du bistrot	
1962	Pourquoi Paris?	Le professeur	Uncredited
1963	La soupe aux poulets	Cazenave	
1963	OSS 117 Is Unleashed	Mayan	
1963	Maigret Sees Red	Bidoine	
1963	Blague dans le coin	Lippy	
1964	La Mort d'un tueur	Le Vieux	
1964	Coplan Takes Risks	Bianco	
1964	Rien ne va plus	Muller	
1964	Requiem pour un caïd	Grégorio	
1964	Que personne ne sorte	Charlie Ross	
1965	Ces dames s'en mêlent	Angelo	
1965	The Vampire of Düsseldorf	Commissaire Momberg	
1965	Pierrot le Fou	Le gangster	Uncredited
1965	When the Pheasants Pass	Arthur Thibaut	
1982	Meurtres à domicile	Prinz	
1982	Une femme en fuite		(final film role)
