= The Money Trap =

1965 film

- Directed by: Burt Kennedy
- Written by: Lionel White (novel); Walter Bernstein
- Produced by: David Karr; Max E. Youngstein
- Starring: Glenn Ford; Elke Sommer; Rita Hayworth; Ricardo Montalbán; Joseph Cotten
- Cinematography: Paul C. Vogel
- Edited by: John McSweeney Jr.
- Music by: Hal Schaefer
- Distributed by: Metro-Goldwyn-Mayer (MGM)
- Release date: 1965
- Running time: 91 minutes
- Country: United States
- Language: English

The Money Trap is a 1965 American crime drama film directed by Burt Kennedy, written by Walter Bernstein based on the novel of the same title by Lionel White, and starring Glenn Ford, Elke Sommer, Rita Hayworth, Ricardo Montalbán, and Joseph Cotten.

== Plot ==
Joe Baron, an underpaid police detective, lives a life of luxury. His wife Lisa is not only young and beautiful, she's rich. But when their stock dividends drop in value, Joe finds himself in need of cash to support Lisa's standard of living. The next day, Joe and his partner Pete are ordered to investigate a rich GP, Dr. Van Tilden , who claims he shot an intruder, Phil Kenny , in his home. While investigating, Joe and Pete examine a wall safe on Van Tilden's second floor. They also find Kenny lying nearby, still breathing. Joe rides in the ambulance with Kenny, who confesses he was after two bags of cash containing $500,000. He then gives Joe the safe's combination before dying.

That evening, Joe, who is secretly shadowed by Pete, visits Kenny's wife, Rosalie, a bar waitress. Coincidentally, she is also one of Joe's ex-flames. She validates Kenny's claim that he was after the $500,000. Joe's partner Pete tells him he "wants in." Joe agrees, and together they devise a plan to steal Van Tilden's cash. Later, to their surprise, Van Tilden expresses a desire to see them. He tells them of feeling guilty over Kenny's death. To distance himself from the tragedy, he's flying to Acapulco. Pete verifies this with the airport.

That night, Joe and Pete break into Van Tilden's house and raid the wall safe. Van Tilden, who had merely set up a sham departure, is lying in wait with a henchman, Matthews. Pete is seriously wounded, but Joe overcomes the pair and helps Pete into his car. At Joe's home Lisa frets over Pete's condition while the two detectives examine their take. They discover one bag contains heroin. To get Pete desperately needed medical care, Joe phones Van Tilden, offering to swap the drugs for Van Tilden treating Pete. Van Tilden accepts. A short time later, he arrives at Joe's residence. Pete dies in spite of the treatment. Matthews shows up, leading to a shoot-out. The only survivor is a wounded Joe. Seeing him, Lisa phones an ambulance. But Joe orders her to call the police. He takes one last look at his luxurious surroundings, as his wife notifies the authorities.

== Cast ==
- Glenn Ford as Joe Baron
- Elke Sommer as Lisa
- Rita Hayworth as Rosalie
- Ricardo Montalbán as Pete Delanos
- Joseph Cotten as Dr. Van Tilden
- James Mitchum as Detective Wolski
- Tom Reese as Matthews
- Fred Essler as Mr.Klein
- Eugene Iglesias as Father
- Teri Lynn Sandoval as Daughter
- Argentina Brunetti as Aunt

== Production ==
The Money Trap (1965) was the fifth and final feature-film teaming of Glenn Ford and Rita Hayworth, following The Lady in Question (1940), Gilda (1946), The Loves of Carmen (1948) and Affair in Trinidad (1952); and the only one not made for Columbia Pictures.

The Guardian 's Tim Pulleine, writing in the BFI Companion to Crime in 1998, notes that The Money Trap, which he calls "self-consciously a throwback, to the extent that its featured performers might well have played corresponding roles fifteen years earlier," is "among the last major studio productions to be filmed in black and white."

== Reception ==
According to film historian Gene Ringgold in The Films of Rita Hayworth in 1974, the contemporary reviews of The Money Trap tended to be negative or dismissive, though many had kind words for Hayworth. In his 1968 book, The American Cinema, Andrew Sarris found the film "unexpectedly poetic in its evocation of forties fakery and urban melodrama." In 2003, Leonard Maltin rated it two and a-half stars (out of four) and called it a "pedestrian murder yarn", but also found Hayworth "most convincing as a middle-aged woman no longer self-sufficient."

Director Burt Kennedy called it, "A pretty good script, and not a bad picture," in his 1997 book "Hollywood trail boss : behind the scenes of the wild, wild western".

== See also ==
- List of American films of 1965
