= Juissi =

Finnish brand of juices and energy drinks

Juissi is a brand of juices and energy drinks belonging to the Finnish company Marli.

Flavors of Juissi include pineapple-orange, strawberry, lemon-lime, mixed (apple, green grape and raspberry), fruit (grapefruit, pineapple, passion fruit, pear and apple), pear, blueberry-raspberry, Red Energy and Green Energy. All of them are sold in one-liter cartons except for mixed flavor, which can also be found in two-liter cartons, and Red and Green Energy, which are sold in 0.75-liter cartons.
