= Grandi (juice) =

Finnish brand of juice drinks

Grandi is a brand of juice boxes by the Finnish food company Valio.

Grandi came to the market in 1970 to compete with the similar juice box brand Trip produced since 1962.

Originally, the Grandi juice boxes featured the advertising character Kari Grandi who was called "the hero of all who are thirsty" and who travelled in various types of vehicles. In television advertisements the character was played by actors Eeki Mantere and Sami Kojonen.

Grandi juice flavours include strawberry, orange, raspberry, pear and orange-cola.

In the 2020s 1-litre Grandi juice cartons with three new flavours became available: wintery apple, raspberry-pear and peach-ice tea.
