= Pierrot le Fou =

1965 film by Jean-Luc Godard

- Theatrical release poster
- Directed by: Jean-Luc Godard
- Screenplay by: Jean-Luc Godard
- Based on: Obsession; 1962 novel by Lionel White
- Produced by: Georges de Beauregard
- Starring: Jean-Paul Belmondo; Anna Karina; Graziella Galvani; Dirk Sanders; Roger Dutoit; Raymond Devos
- Cinematography: Raoul Coutard
- Edited by: Françoise Collin
- Music by: Antoine Duhamel
- Production company: Films Georges de Beauregard
- Distributed by: Société Nouvelle de Cinématographie (SNC)
- Release dates: 29 August 1965 (Venice); 5 November 1965 (France)
- Running time: 110 minutes
- Country: France
- Languages: French; English
- Budget: $300,000 (est.)
- Box office: 1,310,579 admissions (France)

Pierrot le Fou (pronounced [pjɛʁo lə fu], French for "Pierrot the Fool") is a 1965 French New Wave romantic crime drama road film written and directed by Jean-Luc Godard, starring Jean-Paul Belmondo and Anna Karina. The film is based on the 1962 novel Obsession by Lionel White. It was Godard's tenth feature film, released between Alphaville and Masculin, Féminin. The plot follows Ferdinand, an unhappily married man, as he escapes his boring society and travels from Paris to the Mediterranean Sea with Marianne, a young woman chased by OAS hitmen from Algeria.

It was the 15th-highest grossing film of the year, with a total of 1,310,580 admissions in France. The film was selected as the French entry for the Best Foreign Language Film at the 38th Academy Awards, but was not accepted as a nominee. It received critical acclaim with praise towards the film's narrative style, Belmondo's and Karina's performances, Godard's direction and the cinematography. It has been regarded as one of the best films of all time.

== Plot ==
Ferdinand Griffon is unhappily married and has been recently fired from his job at a TV broadcasting company. After attending a mindless party full of shallow discussions in Paris, he feels a need to escape and decides to run away with ex-girlfriend Marianne Renoir, leaving his wife and children and bourgeois lifestyle.

Following Marianne into her apartment and finding a corpse, Ferdinand soon discovers that Marianne is being chased by OAS gangsters, two of whom they barely escape. Marianne and Ferdinand, whom she calls Pierrot – an unwelcome nickname meaning "sad clown" – go on a crime spree from Paris to the Mediterranean Sea in the dead man's car.

They lead an unorthodox life, always on the run, pursued by the police and by the OAS gangsters. When they settle down in the French Riviera after burning the dead man's car (which had been full of money, unbeknownst to Marianne) and sinking a second car into the Mediterranean Sea, their relationship becomes strained. Ferdinand reads books, philosophizes, and writes a diary. They spend a few days on a desert island.

A dwarf, who is one of the gangsters, kidnaps Marianne. She kills him with a pair of scissors. Ferdinand finds him murdered and is caught and bludgeoned by two of his accomplices, who waterboard him to make him reveal Marianne's whereabouts.

Marianne escapes, and she and Ferdinand are separated. He settles in Toulon while she searches for him everywhere until she finds him. After their eventual reunion, Marianne uses Ferdinand to get a suitcase full of money before running away with her real boyfriend, Fred, to whom she had previously referred as her brother.

Ferdinand shoots Marianne and Fred, then paints his face blue and decides to blow himself up by tying sticks of red and yellow dynamite to his head. He regrets this at the last second and tries to extinguish the fuse, but he fails and is blown up.

== Cast ==
- Jean-Paul Belmondo as Ferdinand Griffon, a.k.a. "Pierrot"
- Anna Karina as Marianne Renoir
- Graziella Galvani as Maria Griffon
- Dirk Sanders as Fred
- Jimmy Karoubi as the dwarf gangster
- Roger Dutoit as gangster #1
- Hans Meyer as gangster #2
- Samuel Fuller as himself (uncredited)
- Princesse Aïcha Abadie as herself
- Alexis Poliakoff as Saylor
- Raymond Devos as man of the port (uncredited)
- László Szabó as László Kovacs, Political exile
- Jean-Pierre Léaud as Young Man in Movie Theater (uncredited)
- Georges Staquet as Staquet
- Henri Attal as gas station attendant #1
- Dominique Zardi as gas station attendant #2
- Viviane Blassel

== Production ==
=== Conception and casting ===
In February 1964, while filming Bande à part, Godard announced that he had plans to adapt Lionel White's recent crime novel Obsession, which he described as “the story of a guy who leaves his family to follow a girl much younger than he is. She is in cahoots with slightly shady people, and it leads to a series of adventures.” Godard told France-Soir that whomever he would cast as the female lead depended on who he cast as the male lead. Had he cast Richard Burton, his first choice, he would have cast his wife Anna Karina alongside him and shoot the film in English to accommodate Burton. Otherwise, if he cast his second choice, Michel Piccoli, he would cast "a very young girl" such as Sylvie Vartan in the role, fearing that Piccoli and Karina would form too "normal" a couple on screen.

Vartan and Piccoli proved unavailable, so Godard cast Jean-Paul Belmondo in the role of Ferdinand. The casting of Belmondo made financing for the film easier to obtain due to his star status after his role in Godard's Breathless (1960). In September 1964, at the New York Film Festival, Godard announced that Karina would star as Marianne alongside Belmondo. Godard later remarked to Cahiers du Cinéma that casting Belmondo and Karina ultimately changed the tone of the film, as "instead of the Lolita or La chienne kind of couple" that he originally envisioned, he now "wanted to tell the story of the last romantic couple, the last descendants of La nouvelle Heloise, Werther, and Hermann and Dorothea."

=== Writing ===
As with many of Godard's movies, no screenplay was written until the day before shooting, and many scenes were improvised by the actors, especially in the final acts of the movie. Although the film preserved the book's basic plot outline of a middle-aged advertising man running away with and obsessing over his children's teenaged babysitter before ultimately killing her, Godard aimed to turn the film into "something completely different", as he told Belmondo.

In the film, the male lead, Ferdinand Griffon, is a failed intellectual with literary ambitions who tries to fulfill his artistic desire after falling in love with Marianne, the female lead. Critic Richard Brody writes that since Marianne is inextricably bound to Ferdinand's great artistic ambitions, her betrayal "not only breaks Ferdinand's heart but also destroys what was to be his life's work." Brody notes that this change in the story's themes and effect mirrored Godard's failing marriage to Karina, who featured in many of his works. Karina and Godard divorced in early 1965, before production on the film had begun.

=== Filming ===
"Based on the book, we had already established all the locations, we had hired the people ... and I was wondering what we were going to do with it all."

— Jean-Luc Godard

Godard initially panicked one week before production was to begin, realizing that many of his original ideas for the film were of little use to him. The shooting took place over two months, starting in the French Riviera and finishing in Paris (in reverse order from the edited movie). Toulon served as backdrop for the film's denouement, photography for which included footage of the storied French battleship Jean Bart. The 1962 Ford Galaxie that was driven into the water and sunk was Godard's own. Jean-Pierre Léaud was an uncredited assistant director on the movie (and also appears briefly as a young man in a movie theater). Sam Fuller has a cameo as the American film director in the party scene.

== Themes and style ==
=== Narrative and editing choices ===
Like many of Godard's films, Pierrot le fou features characters who break the fourth wall by looking into the camera. It also includes startling editing choices; for example, when Ferdinand throws a cake at a woman in the party scene, Godard cuts to an exploding firework just as it hits her. In many cases, Godard, rather than a seamless cut between two shots, inserts a third, unrelated image. Lorenz Engell claims that this third image is, to Godard, characterized by its reality and objectivity, and causes the "chains of images" to "fly apart". The director said the film was "connected with the violence and loneliness that lie so close to happiness today. It's very much a film about France."

=== Pop art aesthetic ===
The film has many of the characteristics of the then dominant pop art movement, making constant disjunctive references to various elements of mass culture. Like much pop art, the film uses visuals drawn from cartoons and employs an intentionally garish visual aesthetic based on bright primary colors. Critic Richard Brody writes that the aesthetics of Godard's previous films had been based around intellectual modernism, such as in Une femme mariee (1964) and sometimes film-noir conventions, for instance in Breathless (1960). According to Brody, Godard's political anger at the escalation of the Vietnam War and waning inspiration from Obsession's original noir-like storyline led him to achieve "new heights of spontaneity and lightning invention" on the film, resulting in the film's pop art aesthetic. Volker Panteburg writes that the film demonstrates Godard's interest in color and the "explosive power of images" just as much as story, citing the final scene where Ferdinand paints his face "Yves Klein blue" and kills himself with "Pop Art red sticks of dynamite."

As in many pop art works, such as those of Roy Lichtenstein, Pierrot le fou prominently utilizes text, often pre-existing, to comment on its own story and ideas, isolating and highlighting the extradiegetic information that is normally semiconsciously absorbed. For instance, just before their first major confrontation with the OAS, Ferdinand and Marianne walk past a sign with a warning about a harbor-front drop that reads "danger de mort" (danger of death), foreshadowing their deaths. Godard often uses commercial text in the film and recontextualizes it, such as the word "total", appearing at a gas station, taking on the extra significance of the term "sum total", which is uttered by Ferdinand soon after.

=== Artistry ===
“Velázquez, past the age of fifty, no longer painted specific objects. He drifted around things like the air, like twilight, catching unawares in the shimmering shadows the nuances of color that he transformed into the invisible core of his silent symphony.”

— Élie Faure, quoted by Ferdinand (Jean-Paul Belmondo) in the film's first scene

Pierrot le fou continues a tradition of Godard directing attention to the arts. Richard Brody draws a parallel between Ferdinand's "vast, cosmic, quasi-metaphysical artistic dreams" and Godard's "own search for another kind of cinematic art, one that goes beyond the visual presentation of objects and characters" to a higher, purer presentation of ideas. He points to the film's first scene, in which Ferdinand sits in his bathtub and reads a passage from the art critic Élie Faure on Diego Velázquez.

After the film's release, Godard claimed in making the film, he was attempting "to convey the sense of what Balthazar Claës (Note: Actually a character from Balzac's The Quest of the Absolute.) was doing in The Unknown Masterpiece", referencing a novella by Balzac, who is referenced in the film's opening and closing scenes. The Unknown Masterpiece is about a French painter who has been working alone for years on a portrait of a woman that he believes will usher in new era of art. When his two friends believe it to be a mess, he kills himself. Brody finds a similarity between The Unknown Masterpiece, Pierrot le fou, and Godard's personal life in the "self-portrait of the artist on the verge of pushing a philosophical inquiry into form, or rather formlessness, to an extreme that destroyed not only himself but also his wife."

Ferdinand believes that he will be able to accomplish his dream of writing a novel about "life itself. What lies in between people: space, sound, and color", by isolating himself on an island with Marianne, a dream dispelled by Marianne's boredom on the island. Brody writes that this mirrors Godard's belief that "The glory of nature and a life of shared purpose with a beloved woman are... a natural pair", and how this belief was affected by his divorce of Karina.

=== Consumerism ===
Godard explores consumerism and mass media in Pierrot le Fou, most prominently in an early scene at a cocktail party that demonstrates the bourgeois world Ferdinand flees from. The interactions of the guests consist solely of advertising slogans, drawing attention to the prevalence of commercialism and the strangeness of publicity speech, showing it out of context, in a "real" setting. To emphasize the scriptedness and one-dimensionalism of the public interaction in this scene, Godard saturates the scene with various strong colors, either through lights or a filter on the camera.

Godard uses the film to draw attention to advertising's tendency to sexualize women. In the aforementioned party, women are portrayed both clothed and topless. In an earlier scene, Ferdinand observes an advertisement for a girdle and comments in a voice-over that after the civilizations of Athens and the Renaissance, humanity is entering "the civilization of the ass".

== Release ==
Pierrot le fou premiered at the Venice Film Festival on August 29, 1965, where some audience members initially responded by booing it. The film later opened in France on November 5, and was unsuccessful at the box office, with about 1,310,579 admissions.

=== Criterion release ===
The Criterion Collection first released Pierrot le fou on Blu-ray in September 2008. It was one of its first titles released on Blu-ray before being discontinued after Criterion lost the rights to StudioCanal. In July 2020, Criterion announced the film would be given a re-release in both Blu-ray and DVD with a new 2K digital restoration.

== Reception ==
Despite the boos at Venice, the film received positive reviews. In Le Nouvel observateur, critic Michel Cournot wrote “I feel no embarrassment declaring that Pierrot le fou is the most beautiful film I've seen in my life", while in a front-page review for Les Lettres Françaises, the novelist and poet Louis Aragon praised the film, stating "There is one thing of which I am sure... art today is Jean-Luc Godard." Writing in 1969, Andrew Sarris called Pierrot le fou "the kind of last film a director can make only once in his career."

On the review aggregator website Rotten Tomatoes, 88% of 50 critics' reviews are positive, with an average rating of 8.2/10. The website's consensus reads: "Colorful, subversive, and overall beguiling, Pierrot Le Fou is arguably Jean-Luc Godard's quintessential work."

In the 2012 Sight & Sound poll, it was ranked the 42nd-greatest film ever made in the critics' poll and 91st in the directors' poll. In 2018, the film ranked 74th on the BBC's list of the 100 greatest foreign-language films, as voted on by 209 film critics from 43 countries. In the 2022 Sight & Sound poll, it was ranked the 84th-greatest film ever made in the critics' poll.

== See also ==
- List of submissions to the 38th Academy Awards for Best Foreign Language Film
- List of French submissions for the Academy Award for Best Foreign Language Film
- The Hair (film), also based on the Obsession novel
