= The Mind Poisoners =

1966 novel by Lionel White and Valerie Moolman

The Mind Poisoners is the 18th novel in the long-running Nick Carter-Killmaster series of spy novels. Carter is a US secret agent, code-named N-3, with the rank of Killmaster. He works for AXE – a secret arm of the US intelligence services.

== Publishing history ==
The book was first published in 1966 (Number A198F) by Award Books part of the Beacon-Signal division of Universal Publishing and Distributing Corporation (New York, USA), part of the Conde Nast Publications Inc. The novel was written by Lionel White and Valerie Moolman. Copyright was registered on 1 March 1966.

== Plot summary ==
On Saturday, 6 November 1965, a series of seemingly unconnected acts of violence occur involving college students across America. Dr Martin Winters, Vice Chancellor at the University of California, Berkeley, is murdered before he can present certain evidence to the FBI concerning the student unrest. AXE suspects the murder of Dr Winters and the student unrest are connected. It also suspects that the violent outbursts are triggered by a Chinese communist plot involving mass drug-induced mind control.

Carter is recuperating in San Francisco with movie starlet Chelsea Chase. Hawk summons Carter to a meeting in Cliff House and arranges for him to give classes at UC Berkeley as Dr Jason Nicholas Haig – a visiting professor in philosophy. His orders are to uncover the true nature of the mind control behind the student unrest. His initial contacts are friends of some UC Berkeley students who died in one of the violent outbursts and who are involved in leading student demonstrations on campus.

Before he starts his teaching, Carter searches the offices and warehouse of the Orient Import-Export Company linked to Dr Winters. He discovers a large amount of petty cash and a concealed entrance to a secret room but is unable to find out more before he is disturbed and forced to flee.

Carter is treated with hostility by the former students of the late Dr Winters during his first college lecture. He abandons the class and invites his students to visit him at his home. Several students visit him and Carter probes them for information. On his way out to lunch, Carter's car is deliberately rammed by Blossom Twin – a Chinese student in his class and roommate of one of the dead students. She invites Carter back to her room where she plies him with aphrodisiac wine as a prelude to sex. During intercourse Carter is attacked and knocked out. He awakens in a room with four Chinese men. He is questioned and about to be tortured but attempts to escape. Carter is overwhelmed and restrained again.

When he comes to again Carter is in a doctor's office. He is persuaded by the proprietor, T Wong Chen, that an unfortunate mistake has been made and his attackers will be punished. Carter is released unharmed but reminded not to interfere with Chinatown affairs again. On his way out Carter notices that the building he is in now must be linked by some secret passage to the Orient Import-Export Company warehouse he broke into earlier. Carter later discovers that the owner of the import-export company is T Wong Chen.

Blossom informs Carter that T Wong Chen is her father who has influence in Chinatown and managed to secure his release. However, Blossom claims that she and Carter are now being blackmailed as photographs of them having sex are sent to them anonymously. Blossom also reveals she is a drug addict.

Carter (still undercover as Dr Haig) persuades Blossom to arrange a meeting with her drug pusher, Pio. Carter knocks out Blossom and Pio and searches her apartment. He finds a secret room with a locked filing cabinet. Carter kidnaps Pio and tortures him into revealing the source of his drugs. Pio identifies Arnold Argo – a Las Vegas casino owner as his supplier. Disguised as Jimmy “The Horse” Genelli – a Chicago mobster – Carter investigates Argo's casino and arranges to test a trial shipment of heroin. He also bumps into Chelsea Chase currently employed as a casino entertainer.

Carter is flown to a secret location in the Nevada desert where he is given a sample of heroin. When he is returned to Las Vegas airport he is arrested by corrupt police in the employ of Argo. Argo suspects Chelsea knows more about Genelli than she has said and questions her roughly. Carter escapes from police custody and drives to Argo's ranch where the majority of the drugs are held. Carter kills Argo and his men, confiscates the drugs, burns down the ranch and rescues Chelsea Chase.

Carter returns to San Francisco and searches Blossom's apartment again. In the secret room and locked cabinet he finds recording equipment, photographs and negatives of people having sex and a small quantity of drugs. Questioning Blossom, Carter discovers a Chinese-backed plot to brainwash American students into accepting Communism and provoking civil unrest against the Government. Useful targets are blackmailed with threats to expose sexually explicit photographs, or information on their illicit drug use, and then brainwashed with repetitive recorded messages by Dr Twin. College professors are targeted to corrupt the minds of the young and drug pushers are recruited to sell cut-price drugs laced with an unknown substance that provokes coordinated attacks of aggression.

During his questioning of Blossom Carter is attacked by Chinese agents and Blossom is killed in the crossfire. Carter is beaten unconscious and taken to the basement of the Orient Import-Export Company. The Chinese conspirators decide to eliminate Carter and continue with their operations. Close to death, Carter is dumped into the sewer. He returns later, forcing his way into the basement, and releases Pierre – the poison gas canister. Dr Twin and his conspirators die.

Carter returns to his suite at the Mark Hopkins Hotel and has sex with Chelsea Chase.

== Main characters ==
- Nick Carter – agent N-3, AXE; posing as Dr Jason Nicholas Haig; Jimmy “The Horse” Genelli
- Mr Hawk – Carter's boss; head of AXE
- Blossom Twin – Chinese spy; college student; daughter of Dr Twin
- Dr Twin a.k.a. T Wong Chen – Chinese spy; owner of Orient Import Export Co; father of Blossom
- Pio – Mexican drug pusher
- Arnold Argo – owner of Tumbleweed Casino, Las Vegas; drug supplier
- Chelsea Chase – actress; Carter's girlfriend
- Comrade Ling – Chinese spy
