= Trip (drink) =

Finnish brand of juice

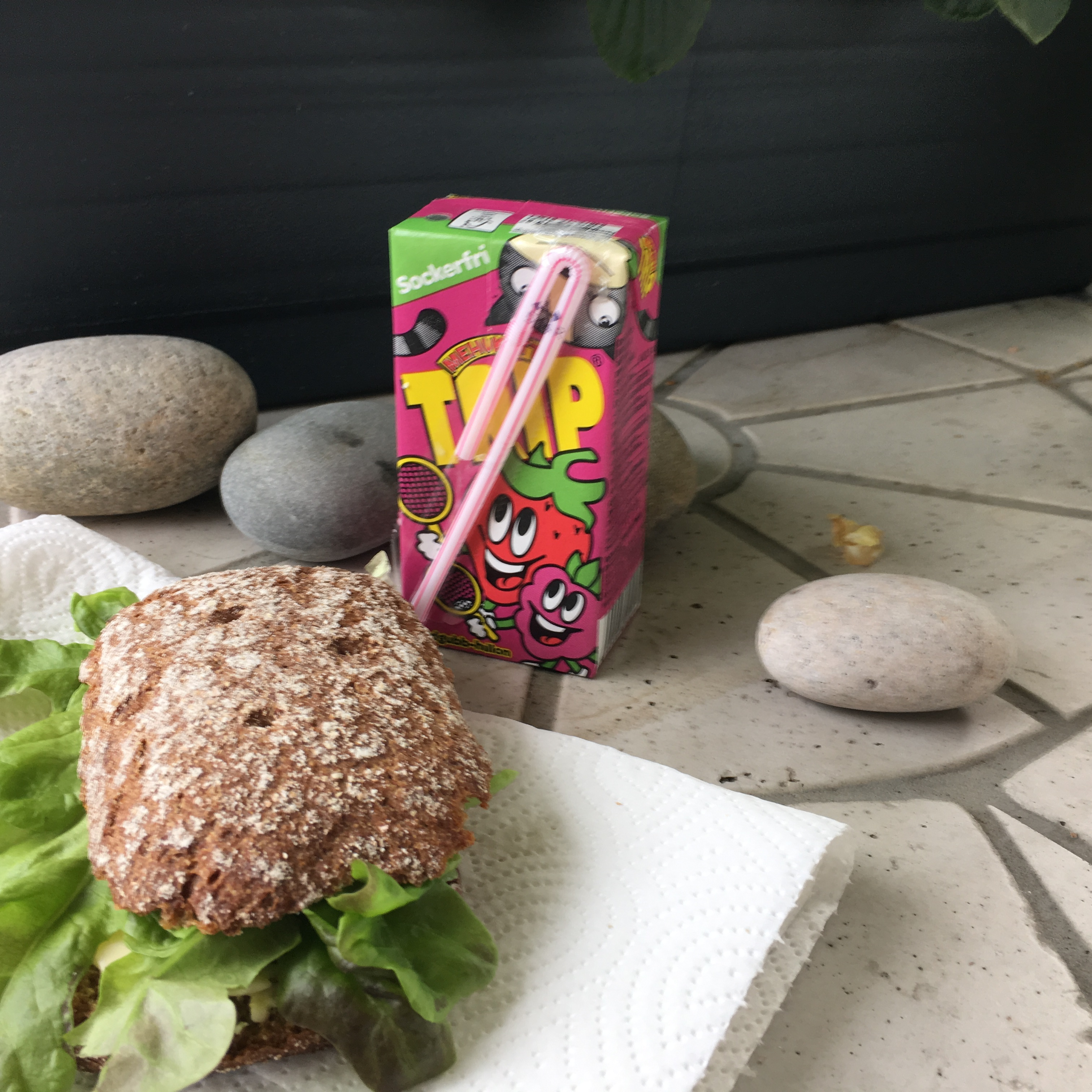

Trip is a Finnish brand of juice produced and distributed by Marli. Launched in 1962, Trip was the first beverage in Finland to be sold in a laminated carton. Originally Trip cartons were pyramid shaped, but were changed to a cuboid shape in the 1990s and were made higher and more narrow in 2002 to better fit children hands. Trip is usually drunk using the straw attached to its packaging.

== See also ==
- Juicebox (container)
