= Thomas David Anderson =

Scottish astronomer

Thomas David Anderson (6 February 1853 – 31 March 1932) was a Scottish amateur astronomer.

== Life ==
He was born at 28 Saxe-Coburg Place in Stockbridge, Edinburgh, the son of John Anderson. When he was five years old, his father showed him Comet Donati, and his nanny also gave him an interest in astronomy.

He was educated at Edinburgh Institution and the University of Edinburgh where he studied theology, graduating with a DSc in philology in 1880. He abandoned his plans of becoming a minister. He was sufficiently well off financially to pursue astronomy full-time.

In 1890 he was living at 3 Alfred Place on the south side of Edinburgh and working as a bank agent for the Bank of Scotland.

He became a keen observer, and discovered two fairly well known novas: Nova Aurigae 1892 and Nova Persei 1901. The former marked the first time a nova's spectrum had been photographed, while the latter eventually reached magnitude 0.2 to become the brightest nova in history since the supernova SN 1604, though it was later topped by Nova Aquilae 1918. His timely discoveries enabled spectra to be taken before maximum magnitude was reached.

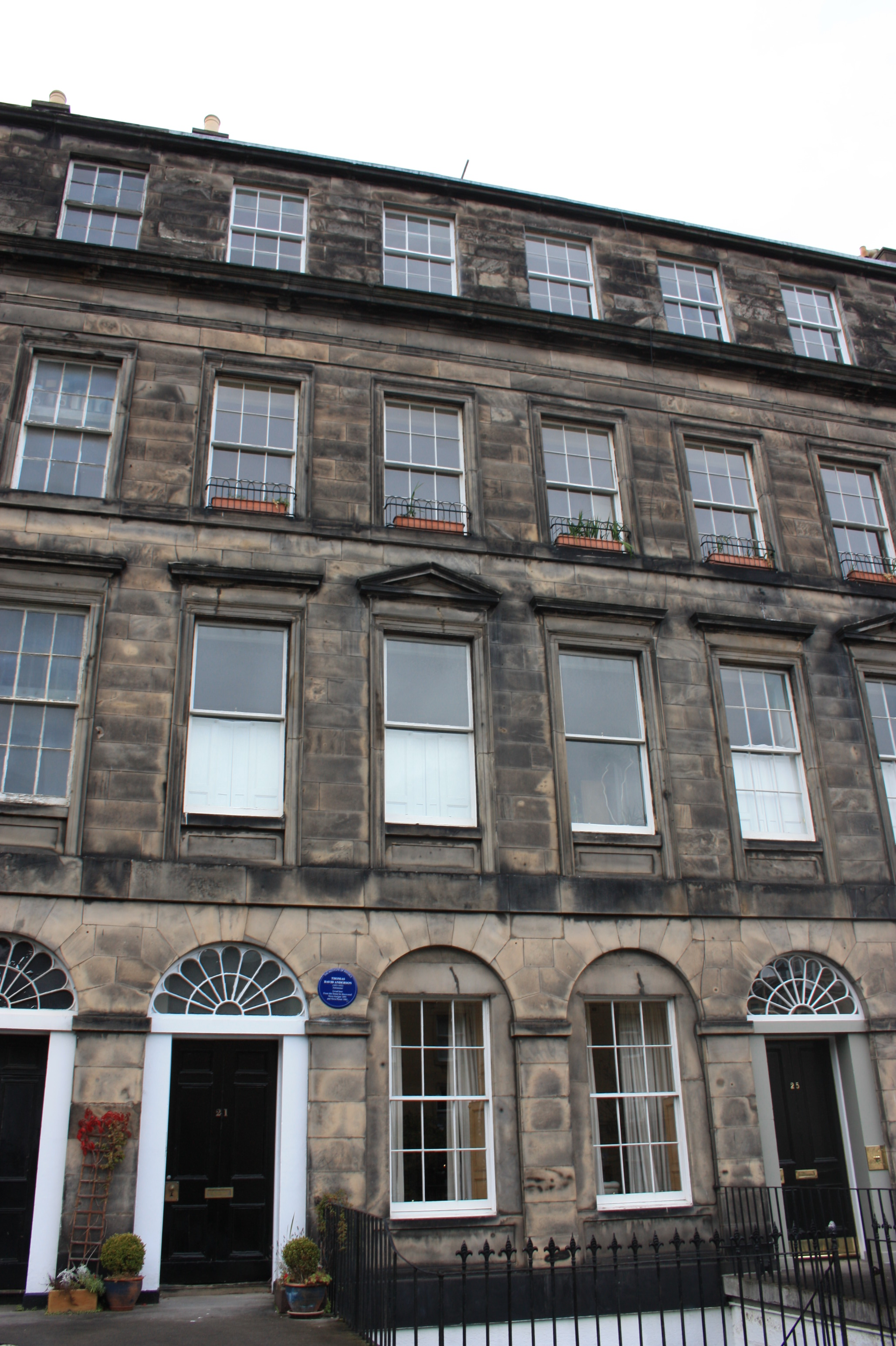
The plaque to Anderson at 21 East Claremont Street, Edinburgh

He constructed his own star charts and discovered 53 variable stars, the first being V Cassiopeiae in 1893. He also discovered through research that the 3rd-magnitude star Theta Eridani had been described as 1st-magnitude by Ptolemy and al-Sufi.

In 1901, Anderson, Joseph Joachim Landerer, and Henri Chrétien jointly received the Prix Jules Janssen, the highest award of the Société astronomique de France, the French astronomical society.

For his nova discoveries he won the Gunning Victoria Jubilee Prize of the Royal Society of Edinburgh for 1897-1900 and the Jackson-Gwilt Medal of the Royal Astronomical Society in 1902.

He left Edinburgh in 1904 in search of better observing conditions. He claimed to have discovered another nova in Cygnus in 1923, but this could not be independently confirmed, and it is possible that it was a flare star.

== Recognition ==
In 1954 the Astronomical Society of Edinburgh had an inscription added to his grave at Innerwick to recognise his discovery of three temporary and 53 variable stars.

In 2014 a plaque was erected in Anderson's memory at 21 East Claremont Street in Edinburgh.
