= Eeki Mantere =

Finnish musician (1949–2007)

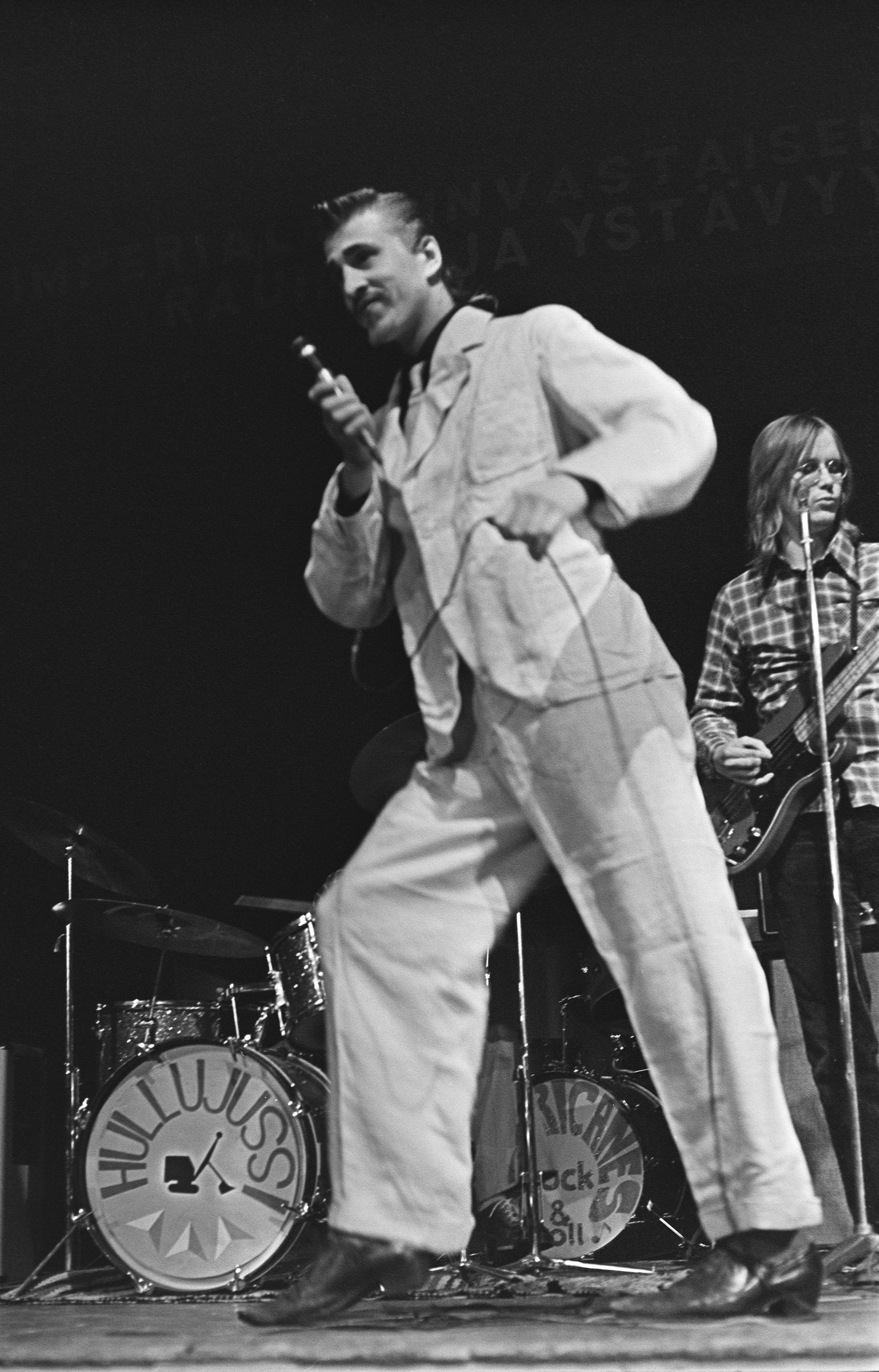
- As Viktor Kalborrek, 1973.

Background information
- Born: Erik Kristian Mantere; 25 January 1949; Helsinki, Finland
- Died: 30 April 2007 (aged 58) Espoo, Finland
- Occupations: Musician, guitarist
- Instrument: Guitar

Erik Kristian “Eeki” Mantere (25 January 1949 – 30 April 2007) was a Finnish musician who became famous in the 1970s as Viktor Kalborrek, soloist of the band Hullujussi.

He was born in Helsinki. After Hullujussi disbanded in 1976, Mantere continued to perform as Viktor Kalborrek until the new millennium, albeit mainly in restaurants, department stores and TV programs. Playing a character that strongly resembled Kalborrek, he acted in the Seppo Huunonen movie The Hair from 1974. In 1989, he played Kalborrek in a supporting role in the Visa Mäkinen film Screws on Loose. In the Juha Tapaninen movie, the Iskelmäprinssi from 1991, Mantere dropped the Kaborrek act and played an Italian fashion guru.

In addition to his acting skills, Mantere also worked as a guitarist, composer, lyricist. Under his artistic name, he released the album Synnyin kiertämään in 1987. Mantere also hosted several TV shows and did ads. One of Mantere's recurring characters in the ads was Kari Grandi, a Kalborrek-type figure. Mantere also provided voiceovers, such as his role of King Louie in the 90s remake of the Finnish sound track for the 1967 Disney movie The Jungle Book.

Mantere's last acting job was in his role on the TV show Romano-tv, which was broadcast by YLE TV1.

Mantere died of pneumonia at the age of 58 in 2007 in Jorvi Hospital in Espoo, Finland.
