= David Grandis =

French conductor

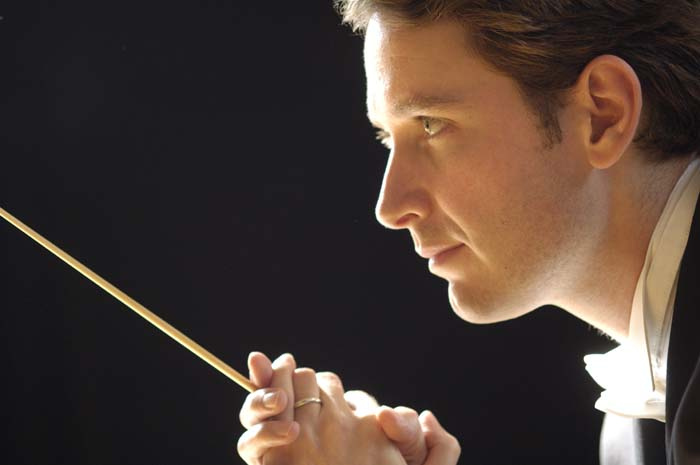
David Grandis

David Grandis is an American conductor and professor. He is the director of orchestras at the College of William and Mary, music director of the Virginia Chamber Orchestra, and music director of the Williamsburg Youth Orchestra. He joined the faculty of William and Mary in 2013. The William and Mary Symphony Orchestra was awarded third place in The American Prize in 2018.

He studied in several national conservatories in France and began his conducting apprenticeship with Klaus Weise. After receiving a B.M. in Musicology in France, he completed a M.M. in orchestral conducting at the University of Illinois at Urbana-Champaign with Donald Schleicher, a G.P.D. at the Peabody Conservatory with Gustav Meier and a D.M.A. in conducting under James Smith at the University of Wisconsin-Madison. He has participated in several master classes with Marin Alsop, Rossen Milanov, John Farrer, Daniel Lewis (conductor), Donald Thulean, Philip Greenberg and Adrian Gnam. He also attended several conducting workshops as a participant in Russia with Misha Kats and in Bulgaria with Gustav Meier.

In 2021, he was awarded a conducting prize at the International Conductors Workshop and Competition in Atlanta.

David Grandis has worked with several conductors such as Klaus Weise, Michel Plasson, Misha Kats, Donald Schleicher, Vincent Monteil, Hajime Teri Murai and Andrea Licata. In 1998, he created the Maeterlinck chamber orchestra and performed several concerts in France.

Music director of the University of Grenoble Symphony Orchestra for the 2003/2004 season, he has also conducted many orchestras including the Philharmonic Orchestra of Nice, the National Orchestra of the Capitole of Toulouse, the Orchestre National Bordeaux Aquitaine, the Belarusian State Philharmonic in Minsk, the New Symphony Orchestra in Sofia, The Peabody Symphony Orchestra, the University of Illinois Symphony Orchestra, the UW-Madison Symphony Orchestra, and the Williamsburg Symphony. Past positions as Assistant Conductor have also included: the Mid-Atlantic Symphony Orchestra in Maryland, the Capital City Symphony Orchestra in Washington, D.C., and the National Philharmonic, where he served as Cover Conductor.

David Grandis has an equal interest in both symphonic and lyric literature. His doctoral thesis, A la recherche du chant perdu, analyzes the French style of opera singing and celebrates the era of the RTLN and its lyric company. It has been published in French and English. He has regularly served as Assistant Conductor at the Opéra National de Lyon in France (Werther, Hansel and Gretel (opera), Capriccio (opera)), and was invited by Albert Lance to conduct productions of Gounod’s Faust (opera) and Puccini’s Il Tabarro. In 2007, David Grandis was assistant conductor of the Baltimore Opera and of the Peabody Conservatory Opera for their productions of Tosca and of the Tales of Hoffmann. Further lyric conducting engagements include several performances of Puccini’s La Bohème with the Long Island Opera Company in 2017.

A specialist of the French repertoire, David Grandis has established long relationships with prominent composers and their descendants: he recently completed research on the symphonic works of Max d'Ollone, contributed to restore a lost score from Jean Françaix.

He is the author of À la recherche du chant perdu (MJW Fedition, Paris, 2013), which was translated into English, The Voice of France (MJW Fedition, Paris, 2013), and Les bergers d'Arcadie (La route de la soie, Paris, 2024), translated into English, The Shepherds of Arcadia (La route de la soie, Paris, 2024).
