= Un Soir de Joie =

- Original film poster.
- Directed by: Gaston Schoukens
- Written by: E. Olin
- Music by: José Fontaine
- Release date: January 28, 1955 (Belgium)
- Country: Belgium

Un Soir de Joie (French) (Note: The film's title is a pun, meaning both "A joyous evening" and "A joyous Le Soir".) is a Belgian comic film directed by Gaston Schoukens and released in 1955. The film's plot takes place in German-occupied Belgium during World War II and focuses on the so-called Faux Soir, a satirical version of the German-controlled newspaper Le Soir produced by the resistance.

The film includes extensive footage of Brussels in the 1950s, where it was filmed on location.

Marcel Roels, Roger Dutoit, Jean-Pierre Loriot, Victor Guyau, Madeleine Rivière, Jacques Philippet, Francine Vendel all acted in the film.

== Plot ==
Based on a true story from November 1943: the Resistance manages to publish a fake edition of the pro-German newspaper 'Le Soir', put on sale by surprise in the newsstands and stuffed full of parodic articles pouring ridicule upon occupying forces. The film faithfully traced the course of this humorous and enterprising attempt to wake up the populace, filling out the basic plot with irreverent patriotic gags.
