= Grandis =

Grandis may refer to:

- Grandis (company), a technology company
- Grandis (surname)
- Eucalyptus grandis, a species of eucalyptus, also called flooded gum or rose gum
- Mitsubishi Grandis, a large multi-purpose vehicle
- Pizza Grandis, the most popular frozen pizza in Norway

subspecies and hybrids

- Dactylorhiza × grandis, an orchid hybrid between D. fuchsii and D. praetermissa found in Western Europe
- Orobanche californica ssp. grandis, a subspecies of the California broomrape, a plant native to western North America from British Columbia to Idaho to Baja California
- Strix ocellata ssp. grandis, a subspecies of the mottled wood owl, a large owl species found in India

== See also ==
- Grandi (disambiguation)
- Grande (disambiguation)
