= GK Persei =

Star in the constellation Perseus

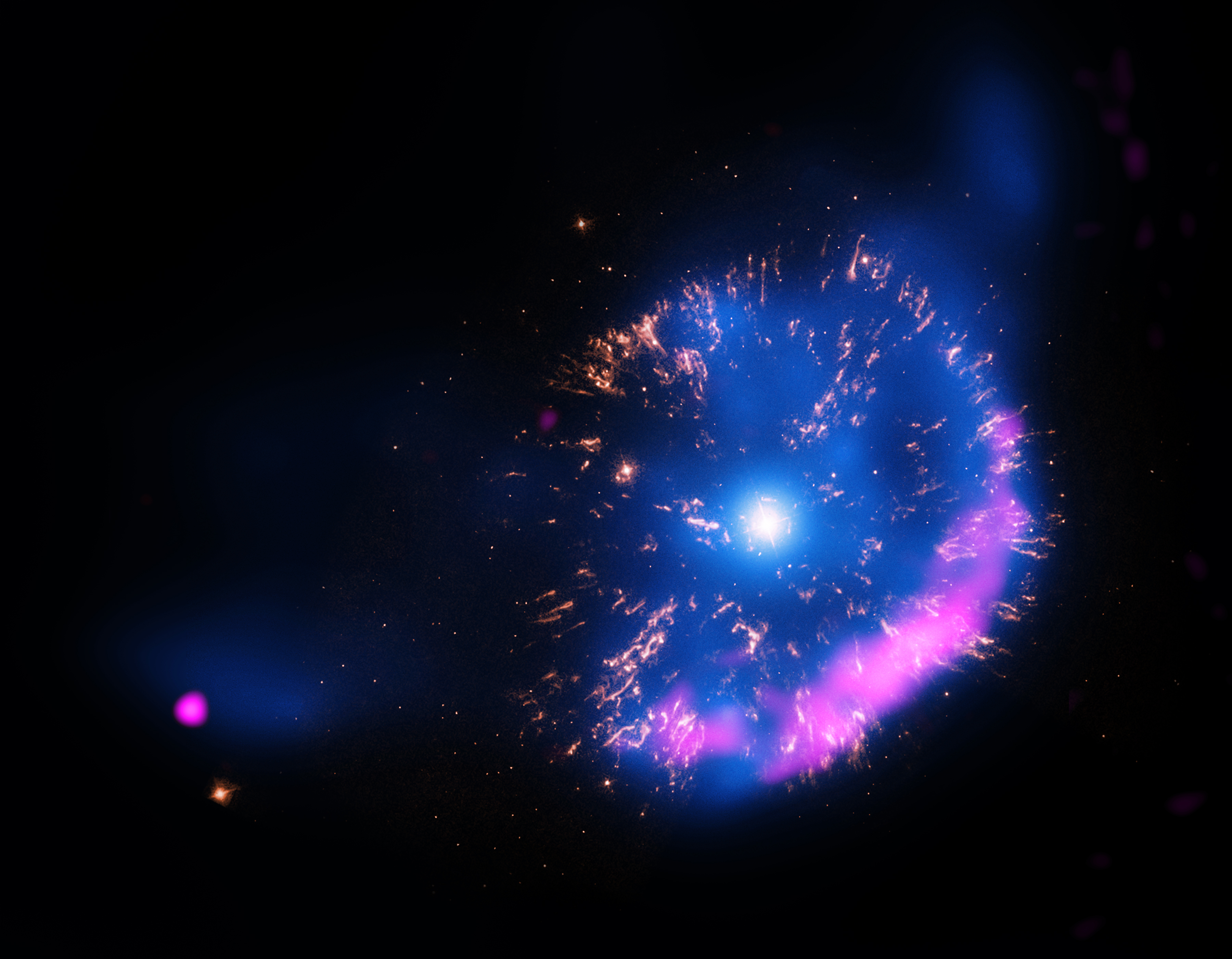
- GK Persei and the surrounding Firework Nebula.

Observation data Epoch J2000.0 Equinox ICRS
- Constellation: Perseus
- Right ascension: 03^{h} 31^{m} 11.82^{s}
- Declination: +43° 54′ 16.8″
- Apparent magnitude (V): 0.02 - 14.0

Characteristics
- Spectral type: K1IV

Astrometry
Radial velocity (R_{v})	5.5 km/s
Proper motion (μ)	RA: −6.878 mas/yr Dec.: −17.348 mas/yr
Parallax (π)	2.3063±0.0415 mas
Distance	1,440^{+29}_{−26} ly (442+9 −8 pc)
Absolute magnitude (M_{V})	−9.1 - +3.7

Orbit
Period (P)	1.996872 ± 0.000009 d
Inclination (i)	67 ± 5°
Semi-amplitude (K_{2}) (secondary)	126.4 ± 0.9 km/s

Details

White dwarf
Mass	1.03+0.16 −0.11 M_{☉}

Subgiant
Mass	0.39+0.07 −0.06 M_{☉}
Radius	2.26 ± 0.11 R_{☉}

Other designations
- GK Per, Nova Per 1901, HD 21629, HR 1057, BD+43 740a, 2MASS J03311201+4354154, 1RXS J033111.9+435427

Database references
SIMBAD	data

GK Persei (also Nova Persei 1901) was a bright nova first observed on Earth in 1901. It was discovered by Thomas David Anderson, an Edinburgh clergyman, at 02:40 UT on 22 February 1901 when it was at magnitude 2.7. It reached a maximum magnitude of 0.2, the brightest nova of modern times until Nova Aquilae 1918. After fading into obscurity at about magnitude 12 to 13 during the early 20th century, GK Persei began displaying infrequent outbursts of 2 to 3 magnitudes (about 7 to 15 times quiescent brightness). Since about 1980, these outbursts have become quite regular, typically lasting about two months and occurring about every three years. Thus, GK Persei seems to have changed from a classical nova like Nova Aquilae 1918 to something resembling a typical dwarf nova-type cataclysmic variable star. The 2015 GK Per outburst peaked at magnitude 9.6, and the last outburst peaked around magnitude 10.3 on 19 August 2026. It comes to solar conjunction in May and opposition in November.

Surrounding GK Persei is the Firework Nebula, a nova remnant first detected in 1902 consisting of an expanding cloud of gas and dust bubbles moving up to 1200 km/s.

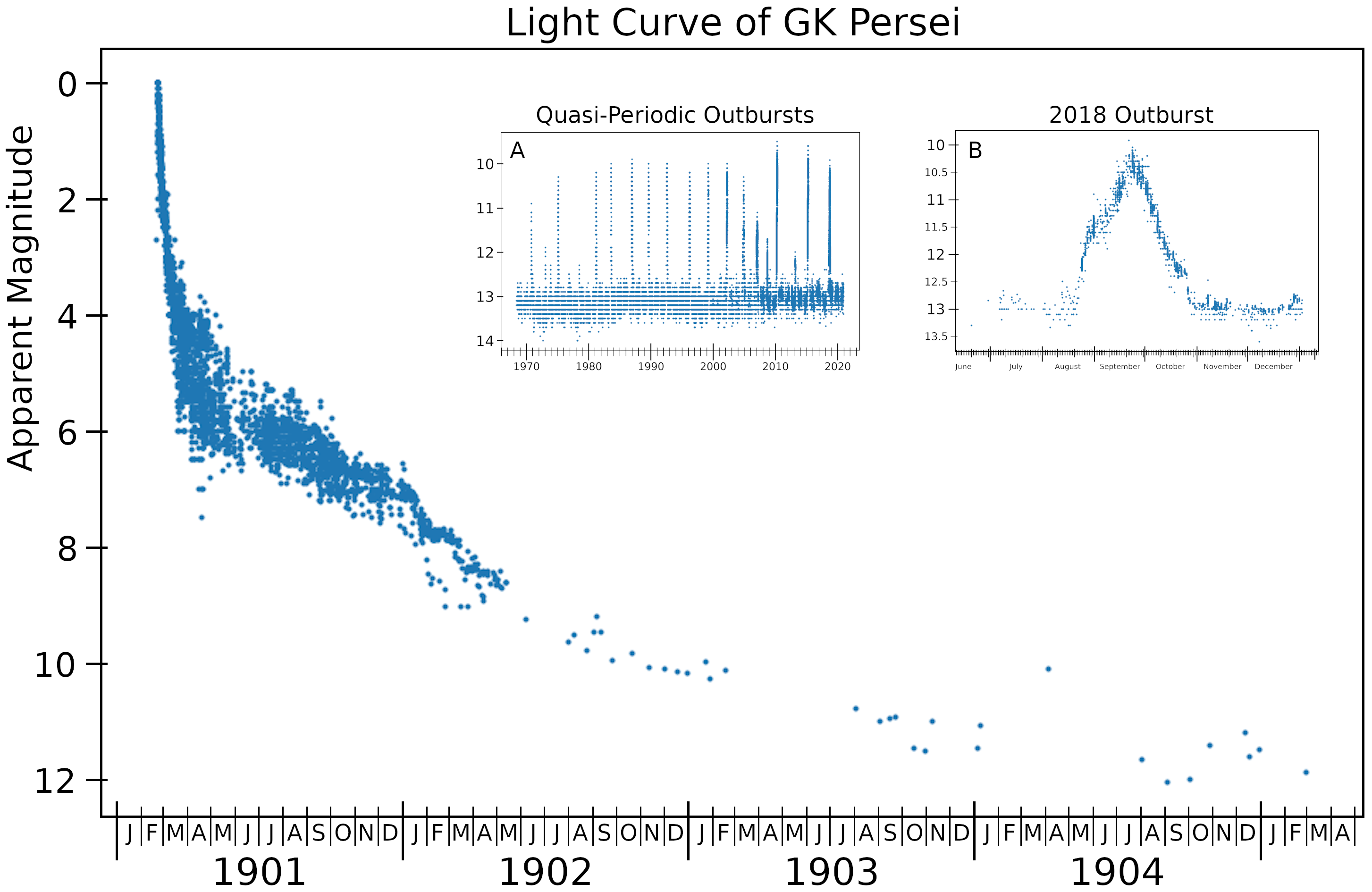
The light curve of GK Persei, plotted from AAVSO data. The main plot shows the major outburst in 1901. Subplot A shows the minor outbursts which have been occurring about every 3 years since around 1980. Subplot B shows the outburst that occurred in 2018, on an expanded scale.

GK Persei has precise parallaxes reported from Gaia DR2 and Gaia EDR3, but these are thought to be badly affected by the binary nature of the system. The Hubble Space Telescope has used a different method to derive the distance to GK Persei using nebular expansion velocity and compares that with its own astrometric parallax calculation. This gave a somewhat smaller parallax (larger distance) than the Gaia measurements.

Nova Persei, as it was then called, was the first nova exhibiting so-called superluminal motion of the ejecta. That this was the case was noted by Jacobus Kapteyn in December, 1901, on the basis of estimates of its distance from Earth.

== Properties ==
Novae consist of a main-sequence to giant star that accretes mass onto a white dwarf. The two stars of GK Persei orbit each other with a period of nearly 2 days. The white dwarf, with a mass of 1.03 M_{☉}, has one of the highest masses measured in a cataclysmic variable. The donor star, having donated much of its mass to the white dwarf, is only 0.39 M_{☉} despite being a subgiant star.

== Gallery ==
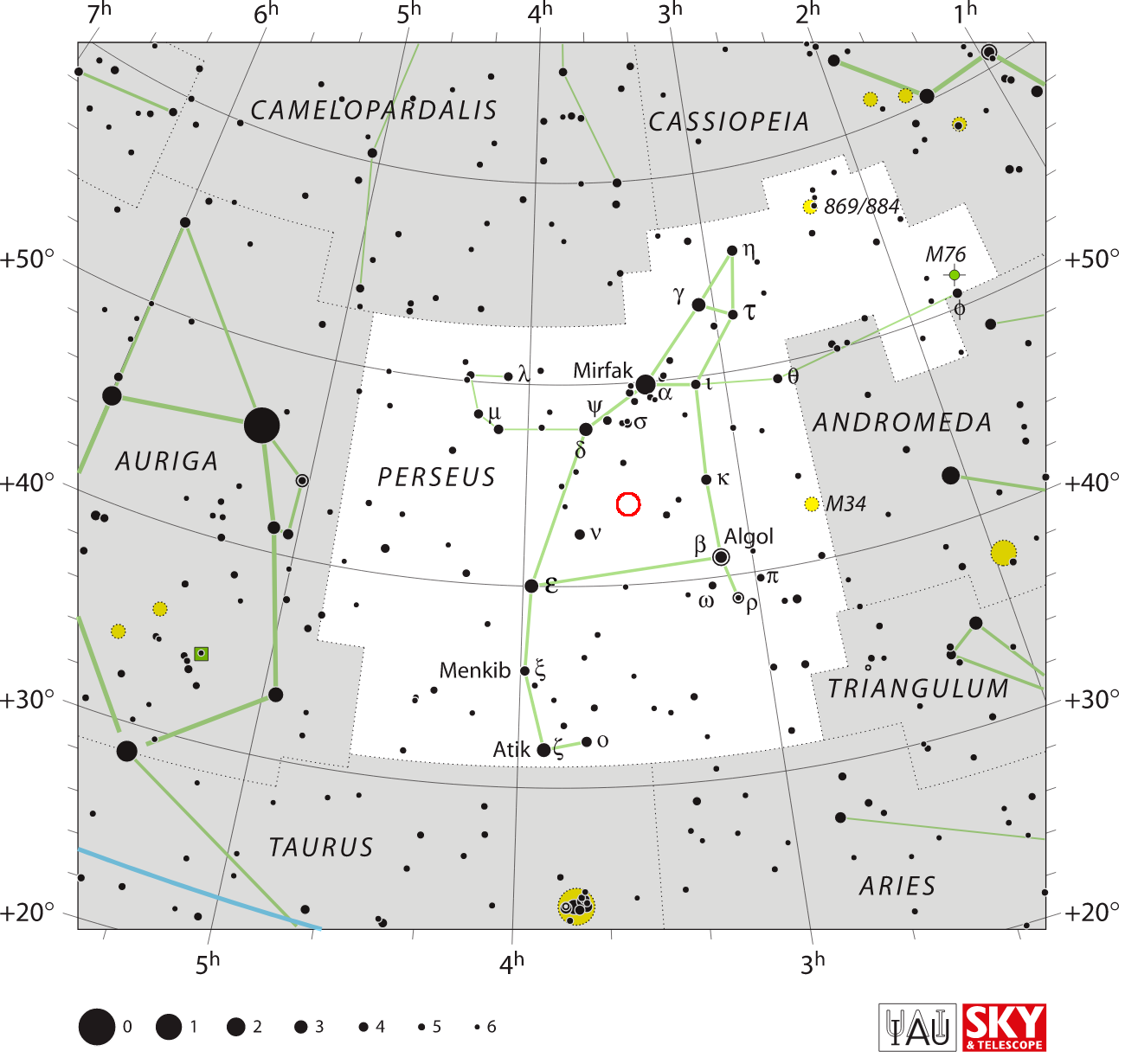
The location of GK Persei (circled in red)

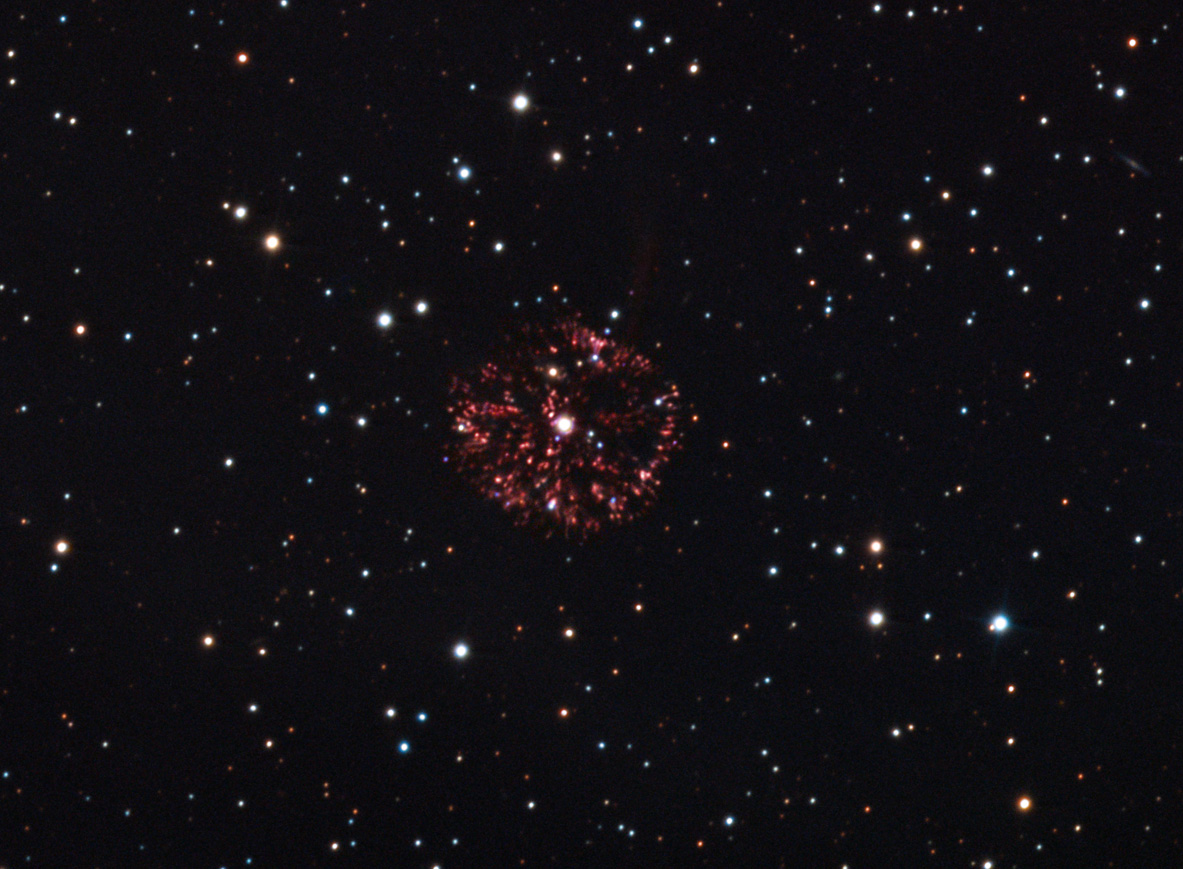
GK Persei by the 32-inch Schulman Telescope at the Mt. Lemmon Observatory.

Expanding Nebula around GK Persei. Images range from 1953 to 2012.

Changing light-echo observed at the time of the 1901 Nova, hand-drawn by G.W. Ritchey at the Yerkes Observatory.
