= Joe R. Lansdale bibliography =

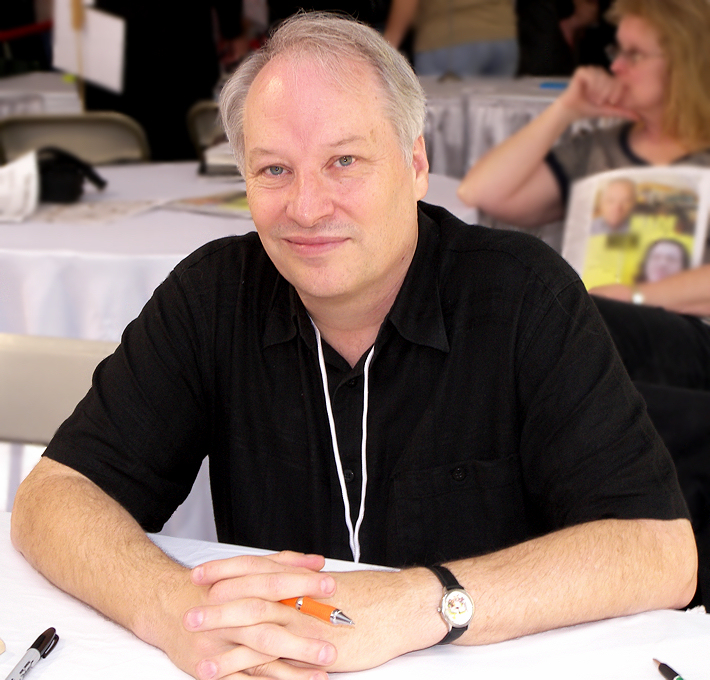
- Joe Lansdale at a book signing
- Novels↙: 63
- Articles↙: 2
- Stories↙: 26
- Collections↙: 41
- Pamphlets↙: 12
- Comics↙: 79
- Scripts↙: 1
- Interviews↙: 1
- Books edited↙: 15

This is a list of works by author Joe R. Lansdale.

Dates by original publication; some novels or stories were written years prior to actual publication.

== Hap Collins and Leonard Pine Mysteries ==
| Title | Year | Type | Pages | Publisher/Notes |
|---|---|---|---|---|
| Savage Season | 1990 | Novel | 176 | Mark V. Ziesing, Bram Stoker Award nominee |
| Mucho Mojo | 1994 | Novel | 308 | Cemetery Dance Publications limited edition and a trade hardcover by Mysterious Press; A New York Times Notable Book of the Year |
| The Two-Bear Mambo | 1995 | Novel | 273 | Mysterious Press |
| Bad Chili | 1997 | Novel | 219 | Mojo Press limited edition and a trade hardcover by Mysterious Press |
| Rumble Tumble | 1998 | Novel | 229 | Subterranean Press limited edition and a trade hardcover by Mysterious Press |
| Veil's Visit: a Taste of Hap and Leonard | 1999 | Stories and excerpts | 160 | Subterranean Press limited edition Includes the eponymous story co-written with Andrew Vachss |
| Captains Outrageous | 2001 | Novel | 323 | Subterranean Press limited edition and a trade hardcover by Mysterious Press |
| Vanilla Ride | 2009 | Novel | 243 | Knopf Publishing |
| Devil Red | 2011 | Novel | 205 | Knopf Publishing |
| Hyenas: a Hap and Leonard Novella | 2011 | Novella | 100 | Subterranean Press limited hardcover and trade edition |
| Dead Aim | 2013 | Novella | 102 | Subterranean Press limited hardcover and trade edition |
| Briar Patch Boogie: A Hap and Leonard Novelette | 2015 | Long story | 56 | Gere Donovan Press, Kindle e-book. |
| Honky Tonk Samurai | 2016 | Novel | 352 | Mulholland Books. |
| Hap and Leonard | 2016 | Short story collection | 230 | Tachyon Publications, Trade paperback. |
| Hap and Leonard Ride Again | 2016 | Short story collection | | Tachyon Publications and Kindle E-book. |
| Hoodoo Harry | 2016 | Novella | 72 | The Mysterious Bookshop. Limited hardcover or paperback. |
| Coco Butternut: A Hap and Leonard Novella | 2017 | Novella | 88 | Subterranean Press. Hardcover and Kindle e-book. |
| Rusty Puppy (Hap Collins and Leonard Pine) | 2017 | Novel | 288 | Mulholland Books. Hardcover and Kindle e-book. |
| Hap and Leonard: Blood and Lemonade | 2017 | Mosaic novel | 240 | Tachyon Publications, trade paperback. |
| Cold Cotton: A Hap and Leonard Novella | 2017 | Novella | 108 | Crossroads Press. Only available through Amazon Kindle. May be published as a hard copy at a later date. |
| Jackrabbit Smile | 2018 | Novel | 242 | Muholland books. Released on March 27, 2018. |
| The Elephant of Surprise | 2019 | Novel | 288 | Muholland Books |
| The Big Book of Hap and Leonard | 2019 | Omnibus | 336 | SST Publications. Hardcopy limited to 400 copies and now out of print. Trade paperback from Tachyon Publications and Amazon Kindle available. |
| Of Mice and Minestrone: Hap and Leonard: The Early Years | 2020 | Short story collection | 240 | Tachyon Publications, May 14, 2020 |
| Born for Trouble: The Further Adventures of Hap and Leonard | 2022 | collection of novellas | 310 | Tachyon Publications, March 2022 |
| Sugar on the Bones | 2024 | Novel | 336 | Muholland Books |
| Hatchet Girls | 2025 | Novel | 288 | Muholland Books |
| Petrified Dreams | 2026 | Novel | 288 | Little, Brown and Company. This will be the final book in the series. |

== Other novels ==
| Title | Year | Type | Pages | Publisher/Notes |
|---|---|---|---|---|
| Act of Love | 1981 | Novel | 319 | Cemetery Dance Publications, Reissued by Subterranean Press in 2012 with a new introduction and novella |
| Texas Night Riders | 1983 | Novel | 152 | Subterranean Press limited edition, originally published under the pseudonym Ray Slater |
| Dead in the West | 1986 | Novel | 148 | Space and Time paperback in 1986 under Night Shade Books. Reissue in 2005. Originally written in 1980 |
| The Magic Wagon | 1986 | Novel | 153 | Doubleday, Subterranean Press limited edition hardcover and trade paperback; Borderlands Press |
| The Nightrunners | 1987 | Novel | 242 | Dark Harvest Books and in the short story collection The God of the Razor by Subterranean Press. Reissued in mass paperback in December 1995 by Carroll & Graf Publishers. Originally written in 1982 as Night of the Goblins. Recently re-issued in 2013 as a trade paperback by Behooven Press |
| Cold in July | 1989 | Novel | 234 | Bantam, hardcover reprint by Mark V. Ziesing. Also available as a set with Savage Season; Film adaptation was released 23 May 2014 |
| Tarzan: The Lost Adventure | 1995 | Novel and comic book series | 208 | Serialized in 4 parts by Dark Horse Comics. Published as one volume in 1995. Joe Lansdale rewrote and completed this unfinished story by the late Edgar Rice Burroughs. |
| The Boar | 1998 | Novel | 169 | Subterranean Press limited edition. Later trade hardcover by Night Shade Books |
| Freezer Burn | 1999 | Novel | 245 | Crossroads Press limited edition and a trade hardcover by Mysterious Press |
| Waltz of Shadows | 1999 | Novel | 271 | Subterranean Press limited edition. Part of the Lost Lansdale Series Vol. 1 |
| Something Lumber This Way Comes | 1999 | Novella | 90 | Subterranean Press limited edition children's book and the Lost Lansdale Series Vol. 2 |
| The Big Blow | 2000 | Novel | 153 | Subterranean Press limited edition, adapted from the Bram Stoker Award winning short story. This novel is being adapted to a film by Ridley Scott's production company Scott Free. |
| Blood Dance | 2000 | Novel | 203 | Subterranean Press limited edition. The Lost Lansdale Series Vol. 3 |
| The Bottoms | 2000 | Novel | 332 | Subterranean Press limited edition and a trade hard cover by Mysterious Press. This book won the 2000 Edgar Award for Best Novel and the 2000 Herodotus Award for Best Historical Mystery Novel. It was also named a New York Times Notable Book of the Year. This novel is currently being adapted to film. |
| A Fine Dark Line | 2002 | Novel | 412 | Subterranean Press limited edition and as a trade hard cover by Mysterious Press |
| Sunset and Sawdust | 2004 | Novel | 321 | Knopf Publishing |
| Lost Echoes | 2007 | Novel | 330 | Subterranean Press limited edition and trade paperback by Vintage Crime/Black Lizard publications. |
| Leather Maiden | 2008 | Novel | 287 | Knopf Publishing |
| Under the Warrior Star | 2010 | Novella | 70 | Planet Stories Double Feature-Paizo Publishing. Features a 1956 novel, Sojan the Swordsman, by Michael Moorcock |
| All the Earth, Thrown to the Sky | 2011 | Novel | 227 | Delacorte Press young adult story. Reissued as trade paperback. |
| Edge of Dark Water | 2012 | Novel | 292 | Published in the United States by Mulholland Books and as a limited edition by PS Publishing in the U.K. It was listed as a Booklist Editors' Choice: Adult Books for Young Adults by the American Library Association. |
| In Waders from Mars | 2012 | Novel | 52 | Subterranean Press. Children's book with Karen and Keith Lansdale |
| A Bone Dead Sadness | 2012 | Novella | 55 | This book was released as an e-book only. |
| The Ape Man's Brother | 2013 | Novella | 60 | This book was released as an e-book and a hard cover book from Subterranean Press. |
| The Thicket | 2013 | Novel | 340 | Mulholland Books The trade paperback was issued on October 14, 2014. |
| Hot in December | 2013 | Novella | 110 | Dark Regions Press |
| Prisoner 489 | 2014 | Novella | 64 | Black Labyrinth Publications |
| Black Hat Jack | 2014 | Novella | 128 | Subterranean Press |
| Paradise Sky | 2015 | Novel | 320 | Mulholland Books Awarded Best Historical Novel by the Western Writers of America. |
| Fender Lizards | 2015 | Novel | 232 | Subterranean Press Artwork by Jon Foster |
| Hell's Bounty | 2016 | Novel | 192 | Subterranean Press; Written with John L. Lansdale |
| The Case of the Bleeding wall-A Dana Roberts Mystery | 2017 | Novella | 92 | Subterranean Press. Co-written with Joe's daughter, Kasey Lansdale |
| Bubba and the Cosmic Bloodsuckers | 2017 | Novel | 200 | Subterranean Press, prequel to Bubba Ho-Tep. It was released on October 31, 2017. |
| Jane Goes North | 2020 | Novel | 232 | Subterranean Press and Amazon Kindle. Hardcover limited to 2000 copies. Released 3/31/20. |
| More Better Deals | 2020 | Novel | 288 | Mulholland Books. Amazon Kindle and Hardcover released on March 31, 2020. |
| Big Lizard | 2020 | Novel | 228 | Short, Scary Tales Publications. Co-written by Keith Lansdale. Limited 1500 hardcover editions. |
| Moon Lake | 2021 | Novel | 352 | Mulholland Books, Amazon Kindle and Hardcover was released June 22, 2021. |
| Radiant Apples | 2021 | Novella | 124 | Subterranean Press, A Nat Love novella. |
| The Donut Legion | 2023 | Novel | 304 | Mulholland Books |
| Shooting Star | 2023 | Novella | 48 | Pandi Press |
| The Unlikely Affair of the Crawling Razor | 2024 | Novella | 112 | Subterranean Press |

== Short story collections ==
| Title | Year | Type | Pages | Publisher/Notes |
|---|---|---|---|---|
| By Bizarre Hands | 1989 | Short Story Collection | 246 | Mark V. Ziesing Publications. Bram Stoker Award nominee. Adapted to a comic book series |
| Stories by Mama Lansdale's Youngest Boy | 1991 | SSC | 130 | Pulphouse Publishing. Author's Choice Monthly, publication Series number 18 |
| Bestsellers Guaranteed | 1993 | SSC | 207 | Ace Books paperback |
| Electric Gumbo: A Lansdale Reader | 1994 | SSC | 406 | Quality Paperback Book Club trade paperback, rare issue |
| Writer of the Purple Rage | 1994 | SSC | 304 | Cemetery Dance Publications limited edition. Bram Stoker Award nominee, Reissued paperback |
| A Fist Full of Stories (and Articles) | 1996 | SSC | 337 | Cemetery Dance Publications |
| The Good, The Bad, and the Indifferent | 1997 | SSC | 310 | Subterranean Press limited edition |
| Private Eye Action, As You Like It | 1998 | SSC | 200 | Crossroads Press rare compilation co-written by Lewis Shiner |
| The Long Ones: Nuthin' But Novellas | 1999 | Collection of 4 novellas | 217 | Necro Publications |
| High Cotton: Selected Stories of Joe R. Lansdale | 2000 | SSC | 267 | Golden Gryphon Press hardcover and trade paperback |
| For a Few Stories More | 2002 | SSC | 326 | Subterranean Press limited edition, lost Lansdale Vol. 4. The "ultra-limited" edition of this book included a previously unpublished Young Adult vampire novel called Shadow Time, which has not appeared anywhere else. |
| A Little Green Book of Monster Stories | 2003 | SSC | 106 | Borderlands Press, rare |
| Bumper Crop | 2004 | SSC | 199 | Golden Gryphon Press hardcover and trade paperback |
| Mad Dog Summer and Other Stories | 2004 | SSC | 289 | Subterranean Press limited edition and Golden Gryphon Press trade paperback. Title story won a Bram Stoker Award |
| The King and Other Stories | 2005 | SSC | 98 | Subterranean Press limited edition |
| The God of the Razor | 2007 | SSC | 295 | Subterranean Press limited edition. Includes The Nightrunners |
| The Shadows, Kith and Kin | 2007 | SSC | 287 | Subterranean Press limited edition |
| Sanctified and Chicken Fried | 2009 | SSC | 250 | University of Texas Press |
| Unchained and Unhinged | 2009 | SSC | 143 | Subterranean Press limited edition |
| The Best of Joe R. Lansdale | 2010 | SSC | 369 | Tachyon Publications trade paperback |
| Deadman's Road | 2010 | SSC | 271 | Subterranean Press limited edition |
| By Bizarre Hands Rides Again | 2010 | SSC | 366 | Bloodletting Press/Morning Star limited edition reissue (contains new introduction and novella) |
| Trapped in the Saturday Matinee | 2012 | SSC | 271 | PS Publishing from the U.K. |
| Deadman's Road | 2013 | SSC | 288 | Subterranean Press limited edition, re-issued by Tachyon Publications. The e-book version is titled Deadman's Crossing. |
| Bleeding Shadows | 2013 | SSC | 480 | Subterranean Press limited edition |
| A Pair of Aces | 2014 | SSC | 346 | Macabre Ink Productions/Crossroads Press. Co-written with Neal Barrett Jr. This work will only be available as an e-book/Kindle edition. Cover art by Glenn Chadbourne |
| The Tall Grass and Other Stories | 2015 | SSC | 140 | Only available as a Kindle e-book for now. Published by Gere Donovan Press. May be published as a book at a later date. |
| Dead on The Bones: Pulp on Fire | 2016 | SSC | 296 | Subterranean Press, limited edition, contains short stories and novellas. |
| Terror is Our Business: Dana Roberts' Casebook of Horrors | 2018 | Collection of novellas | 248 | Cutting Block Books, published in May 2018. Collection of Dana Roberts Mysteries. Co-written by Kasey Lansdale |
| Driving to Geronimo's Grave and Other Stories | 2018 | Collection of novellas | 272 | Subterranean Press, limited edition, October 2018 |
| Cosmic Interruptions | 2018 | SSC | 528 | Short, Scary Tales Publications. Volume 1 of 4, containing stories in the science fiction/fantasy genre. Limited to 550 signed and hand numbered copies |
| Blood in the Gears | 2019 | SSC | 554 | Short, Scary Tales Publications. Volume 2 of 4, containing stories in the crime/mystery genre. Limited to 550 signed and hand numbered copies |
| Wet Juju | 2020 | SSC | 710 | Short, Scary Tales Publications. Volume 3 of 4, containing stories in the horror/gothic genre. Limited to 550 signed and hand numbered copies |
| Fishing for Dinosaurs and Other Stories | 2020 | Collection of novellas | 378 | Subterranean Press. Was published November, 2020. |
| Apache Witch and other Poetic Observations | 2021 | SSC | 145 | Independent Legions Publications. Limited to 180 copies. |
| Gothic Wounds | 2021 | SSC | 632 | Short, Scary Tales Publications. Volume 4 of 4, containing stories in the historical/western genre. Limited to 550 signed and hand numbered copies |
| The Events Concerning | 2022 | Collection of two novellas | 176 | Subterranean Press |
| Things Get Ugly: The Best Crime Stories of Joe R. Lansdale | 2023 | SSC | 352 | Tachyon Publications |
| The Senior Girls Bayonet Drill Team and Other Stories | 2023 | SSC | 456 | Subterranean Press. 1250 signed numbered hardcover copies |
| Dark Kin | 2023 | SSC | 254 | Thunderstorm Books / co-written with Kasey Lansdale |
| In the Mad Mountains: Stories Inspired by H. P. Lovecraft | 2024 | SSC | 256 | Tachyon Publications |
| The Essential Horror of Joe R. Lansdale | 2025 | SSC | 332 | Tachyon Publications |

== The "Drive-In" series ==
| Title | Year | Type | Pages | Publisher/Notes |
|---|---|---|---|---|
| The Drive-In: A "B" Movie with Blood and Popcorn, Made in Texas | 1988 | Novel | 158 | Kinnell and Bantam Books |
| The Drive-In 2: Not Just One of Them Sequels | 1989 | Novel | 158 | Kinnell and Bantam Books; Bram Stoker Award nominee |
| The Drive-In: The Bus Tour | 2005 | Novel | 229 | Subterranean Press limited edition |
| The Complete Drive-In | 2009 | Omnibus | 376 | Underland Press trade paperback Compiles all three previous novels |
| The Complete Drive-In | 2015 | Omnibus | 376 | Centipede Press. Limited Edition re-issued limited to 300 copies |

== The "Ned the Seal" Trilogy ==
| Title | Year | Type | Pages | Publisher/Notes |
|---|---|---|---|---|
| Zeppelins West | 2001 | Novel | 168 | Subterranean Press limited edition |
| Flaming London | 2005 | Novel | 177 | Subterranean Press limited edition |
| Flaming Zeppelins: The Adventures of Ned the Seal | 2010 | Omnibus | 285 | Tachyon Publications trade paperback Compiles first two books |
| The Sky Done Ripped | 2020 | Novel | 296 | Subterranean Press limited edition |

== Chapbooks/Pamphlets ==
| Title | Year | Type | Publisher/Notes |
|---|---|---|---|
| On the Far Side of the Cadillac Desert with Dead Folks | 1989 | Chapbook/novella | Won the 1989 Bram Stoker Award in the Long Fiction category and a 1990 British Fantasy Award in the short story category |
| The Steel Valentine | 1991 | Chapbook | Pulphouse Publishing, short story hard cover |
| Steppin' Out, Summer '68 | 1992 | Chapbook | Limited edition |
| Bubba Ho-Tep | 1994 | Chapbook | Adapted into a novel with a movie tie-in, and then adapted to the screen by Don Coscarelli; Bram Stoker Award nominee |
| Tight Little Stitches in a Dead Man's Back | 1998 | Chapbook | Limited edition |
| My Dead Dog Bobby | 1998 | Chapbook | Limited edition |
| Triple Feature | 1999 | Chapbook | Subterranean Press limited edition chapbook |
| Duck Footed | 2005 | Chapbook/novella | Subterranean Press limited edition |
| Dread Island | 2010 | Chapbook/novella | IDW Publishing limited edition |
| The Cases of Dana Roberts | 2011 | Chapbook/short story | Chapbook accompanies the limited edition of the short story collection Subterranean: Tales of Dark Fantasy 2 and another short story, The Case of the Angry Traveler, is in Subterranean Press's short story collection Impossible Monsters, edited by Kasey Lansdale. |
| Christmas with the Dead | 2010 | Chapbook | PS Publishing Holiday Chapbook Number 6 limited edition, adapted to film. DVD is now available |
| The Hungry Snow | 2021 | Chapbook | Death's Head Press, Limited edition |

== Pseudonymous novels ==
| Title | Year | Type | Publisher/Notes |
|---|---|---|---|
| Molly's Sexual Follies | 1982 | Novel | As Mark Simmons; Pseudonymous porn novel written with Brad W. Foster |

== Mark Stone: MIA Hunter series ==
These are a few novels Lansdale wrote under the pseudonym "Jack Buchanan". These novels were co-written with Stephen Mertz, Michael Newton, and Bill Crider. Some people erroneously report that Lansdale is responsible for the entire series, which is definitely not true.

| Title | Year | Type | Pages | Publisher/Notes |
|---|---|---|---|---|
| Hanoi Deathgrip | 1985 | Novel | 197 | Jove Books, paperback, Stone: M.I.A. Hunter #3 |
| Mountain Massacre | 1985 | Novel | 196 | Jove Books, paperback. Stone: M.I.A. Hunter #4 |
| Saigon Slaughter | 1987 | Novel | 199 | Jove Books, paperbackStone: M.I.A. Hunter #7 |
| M.I.A. Hunter | 2015 | Omnibus | 456 | Subterranean Press limited edition, with Stephen Mertz. Collection contains previous three paperbacks |

== Western screenplays ==
| Title | Year | Type | Pages | Publisher/Notes |
|---|---|---|---|---|
| Shadows West | 2012 | Screenplays for several projects | 420 | Subterranean Press limited edition Co-written by John L. Lansdale |

== Uncollected short stories ==
| Title | Year | Type | Publisher/Notes |
|---|---|---|---|
| Red is the Color of Blood and Roses | 1982 | SS | Magazine: Fantasy Macabre, June 1982 |
| What We Found in the Mines That Day | 1984 | SS | Fanzine: Tales As Like As Not, Summer 1984 |
| Nellie | 1984 | SS | Fanzine: Tales As Like As Not, Winter 1984 |
| Voyage | 1985 | SS | Fanzine: Tales As Like As Not, Spring 1985 |
| Castle of Shadows | 1985 | Short Story | W. Paul Ganley publisher Weirdbook #21 Written with Ardath Mayhar |
| Boo Yourself! | 1987 | SS | Whispers (Magazine/Anthologies) issue VI, ed. Stuart David Schiff. Republished in 100 Tiny Tales of Terror, ed. Martin H. Greenberg |
| Disaster Club | 1999 | SS | Cemetery Dance #32 |
| Island | 2006 | SS | Fanzine: Subterranean Press Magazine, April 2006 |
| By Moonlight: A Tale of Zorro | 2011 | SS | Anthology: More Tales of Zorro, edited by Richard Dean Starr |
| Dark | 2011 | SS | Anthology: Portents, edited by Al Sarrantonio |
| Santa Explains | 2015 | SS | Anthology: Christmas Horror: Vol. 1, edited by Chris Morey |
| Hear the Wind Blow | 2019 | SS | Anthology: Brothers in Arms: Stories in Tribute to Richard Matheson's Beardless Warriors, edited by Barry Hoffman & Richard Christian Matheson |
| Promise Me | 2021 | SS | Anthology: Bullets and Other Hurting Things: A Tribute to Bill Crider, edited by Rick Ollerman |
| The Case of the Bitter Witch | 2023 | SS | Anthology: Shakespeare Unleashed, edited by James Aquilone / (co-written with Kasey Lansdale) |
| Hoppity White Rabbit Done Broke Down | 2024 | SS | Anthology: Joe R. Lansdale's The Drive-In: Multiplex, edited by Christopher Golden |
| Under the Moon of Arizona | 2024 | SS | Anthology: Lawless: New Stories of the American West, edited by Russell Davis |
| The Organ Grinder's Monkey | 2024 | SS | Anthology: Neither Beg Nor Yield: Stories with S&S Attitude, edited by Jason M. Waltz |

== Novels and stories with Batman ==
| Title | Year | Type | Pages | Publisher/Notes |
|---|---|---|---|---|
| The Joker's Trick or Treat | 1989 | Short story | 462 | Bantam Books in the anthology The Further Adventures of The Joker, ed. Martin H. Greenberg |
| Subway Jack | 1989 | Short story | 416 | Bantan Books, From the anthology The Further Adventures of Batman #1, ed. Martin H. Greenberg, reprinted in Tales of the Batman, ed. Martin H. Greenberg (1994). Features Lansdale's character, "The God of the Razor" |
| Batman: Captured by the Engines | 1991 | Novel | 241 | Warner Books |
| Batman: Terror on the High Skies | 1992 | Junior novel | 66 | Little Brown and Company. Illustrated by Dick Giordano & Edward Hannigan |

== Comic books and graphic novels ==
| Title | Year | Type | Publisher/Notes |
|---|---|---|---|
| Lone Ranger & Tonto | 1993 | Comic book series and trade paperback | Topps Comics, 4 issues, art by Timothy Truman and Rick Magyar |
| Jonah Hex: Two Gun Mojo | 1993 | Comic book series and trade paperback | DC Comics, 5 issues, art by Tim Truman |
| Jonah Hex: Riders of the Worm and Such | 1995 | Comic book series | DC Comics, 5 issues, art by Tim Truman |
| Blood and Shadows | 1996 | Comic book series | DC/Vertigo, 4 issues, art by Mark A. Nelson |
| The Spirit: The New Adventures #8 | 1998 | Comic book | Kitchen Sink Comics, art by John Lucas |
| Red Range | 1999 | Graphic novel | Mojo Press, art by Sam Glanzman |
| Jonah Hex: Shadows West | 1999 | Comic book series | DC/Vertigo, 3 issues, art by Tim Truman |
| On the Far Side with Dead Folks | 2004 | Comic book series and trade paperback | Avatar Press, 3 issues, art by Tim Truman |
| Masters of Horror | 2005 | Comic book series | IDW Publishing, Masters of Horror #1-2, 4 issues, adapted by Chris Ryall |
| The Drive-In | 2005 | Graphic novels and trade paperback | Avatar Press, 4 issues, art by Andres Guinaldo |
| Conan and the Songs of the Dead | 2006 | Comic book series | Dark Horse Comics, 5 issues, art by Tim Truman |
| Marvel Adventures: Fantastic Four #32 | 2008 | Comic book | Marvel Comics, art by Ronan Cliquet. Reprinted in Marvel Adventures: Fantastic Four Volume 8, 2008 |
| Pigeons From Hell | 2008 | Comic book series and trade paperback | Dark Horse Comics, 4 issues, art by Nathan Fox. Adaptation of the Robert E. Howard short story |
| Yours Truly, Jack The Ripper | 2010 | Comic book series | IDW Publishing, 3 issues with John L. Lansdale, art by Kevin Colden. Based on the story by Robert Bloch |
| That Hell-Bound Train | 2011 | Comic book series | IDW Publishing, 3 issues, art by Dave Wachter. Based on the story by Robert Bloch |
| 30 Days of Night: Night Again | 2011 | Comic book series and trade paperback | IDW Publishing, 4 issues, art by Sam Kieth |
| H. P. Lovecraft's The Dunwich Horror | 2011 | Comic book series | IDW Publishing, 4 issues, art by Peter Bergting |
| Crawling Sky | 2013 | Graphic novel | Antarctic Press; Adapted from short story by Keith Lansdale, art by Brian Denham. |
| Jonah Hex: Shadows West | 2014 | Full-sized trade paperback anthology of all Joe Lansdale's previous Jonah Hex works | DC Comics/Vertigo, approx. 389 pages, art by Tim Truman and Sam Glanzman |
| The Steam Man | 2016 | Comic book series | Dark Horse Comics, 5 issues. 1-3 published, art by Piotr Kowalski |
| I Tell You It's Love | 2016 | Graphic novel | Short, Scary Tales Publications. Original story written in 1983, art by Danille Serra |

== Comic short stories ==
Many were adapted to comic books.

| Title | Year | Type | Publisher/Notes |
|---|---|---|---|
| Drive-By | 1993 | Short Story | Crossroads Press. Adapted from a story by Andrew Vachss, art by Gary GianniOriginally published in Andrew Vachss: Hard Looks #5. Reprinted in Andrew Vachss: Hard Looks (trade paperback)Subsequently, reprinted in a limited edition eponymous trade paperback |
| Grease Trap | 1994 | SS | Mojo PressCreature Features, art by Ted Naifeh; Reissued in Atomic Chili: The Illustrated Joe R. Lansdale (1996, Mojo Press) |
| Shootout at Ice Flats in Supergirl Annual #1 | 1996 | SS | DC Comics, co-written by Neal Barrett Jr. Art by Robert Branishi and Stan Woch |
| The Elopement | 1997 | SS | DC Comics in Weird War Tales #2 (of 4); Art by Sam Glanzman |
| The Initiation | 1998 | SS | DC/Vertigo in Gangland #4 (of 4), co-written by Rick Klaw and Tony Salmons |
| Betrothed | 1999 | SS | DC/Vertigo in Flinch #5. Art by Rick Burchett |
| The Split | 2000 | SS | DC/Vertigo in Strange Adventures #3 (of 4). Art by Richard Corben |
| Red Romance | 2000 | SS | DC/Vertigo in Flinch # 11 Art by Bruce Timm |
| Brer Hoodoo | 2000 | SS | DC/Vertigo in Flinch # 13. Art by Tim Truman |
| Devil's Sombrero | 2001 | SS | DC/Vertigo in Weird Western Tales #2 (of 4). Art by Sam Glanzman |
| Steam Rider: The Steam-Powered Heart | 2006 | SS | Marvel Comics in Amazing Fantasy #20. Art by Byron Penaranda |
| Mice and Money | 2006 | SS | Marvel Comics in Marvel Romance Redux #5 (subtitle Love is a Four Letter Word). Art by Dave Lanphear; Reprinted in Mighty Marvel Romance (trade paperback) |
| Gunhawk: Midnight Gun | 2006 | SS | Marvel Comics in Strange Westerns starring the Black Rider; Art by Rafa Garres; Reprinted in Mighty Marvel Westerns (hardcover) |
| The War at Home (parts 1–3) | 2008 | Comic book series and trade paperback | Boom Studios in Zombie Tales #1-3 (July — September). Art by Eduardo Barreto; Full story collected in Zombie Tales trade Published in December 2008 |
| A Ripping Good Time | 2008 | SS | Papercutz Comics and Graphic Novels in Tales from the Crypt #6 co-written by John L. Lansdale; Art by James Romberger and Marguerite Van Cook |
| Moonlight Sonata | 2008 | SS | Papercutz Comics and Graphic novels in Tales from the Crypt #7. Art by Chris Noeth; Both stories collected in Tales From the Crypt Graphic Novel #4 |
| Virtual Hoodoo | 2008 | SS | Papercutz Comics and Graphic Novels in Tales from the Crypt #8; Co-written by John L. Lansdale. Art by James Romberger and Marguerite Van Cook |
| The Boy Who Turned Invisible | 2017 | SS | Outside. A graphic anthology of new horror fiction from Ash Pure and Topics Press; Art by Daniele Serra |

== Adaptations of previously published stories, by Lansdale unless noted ==
| Title | Year | Type | Publisher/Notes |
|---|---|---|---|
| Dead in the West | 1993 | Comic books | Dark Horse Comics, 2 issues Adapted by Neal Barrett Jr. Art by Jack Jackson; Covers by Tim Truman |
| By Bizarre Hands | 1994 | Comic book series | Dark Horse Comics, 3 issues Adaptations by Neal Barrett Jr. and Jerry Prosser; Art by Phil Hester and Dean Rohrer |
| Atomic Chili:The Illustrated Joe R. Lansdale | 1996 | Graphic novel/trade paperback | Mojo Press; Edited by Rick Klaw; This book was designed by John Picacio and features a cover by Dave Dorman. Many artists contributed throughout the book. |
| Dog, Cat, and Baby | 1999 | Trade paperback/comic books | Amazing Montage Press in Murder by Crowquill #1 with Kieth Lansdale; Art by Tim Truman |
| Bob The Dinosaur Goes To Disneyland | 2001 | Trade paperback | First publication at RevolutionSF (2001 in color, see link); Adapted by Rick Klaw; Art by Doug Potte; First book publication in Geek Confidential: Echoes From the 21st Century by Rick Klaw; Monkeybrain, Inc. (2003 in black and white) |
| Lansdale & Truman's Dead Folks | 2003 | Graphic novels and trade paperback | Avatar Press, 3 issues Art by Tim Truman; Adapted from the story On the Far Side of the Cadillac Desert with Dead Folks |
| The Drive-In | 2003 | Graphic novels and trade paperback | Avatar Press, 4 issues Adapted by Christopher Golden; Art by Andres Guinaldo |
| By Bizarre Hands | 2004 | Comic book series | Avatar Press, 6 issues Adaptations by Neal Barrett, Jr., Keith Lansdale, and Rick Klaw; Art by Dheeraj Verma, Armando Rossi, and Andres Guinaldo |
| The Drive-In 2 | 2006 | Graphic novels and trade paperback | Avatar Press, 4 issues Adapted by Neal Barrett, Jr. Art by Andres Guinaldo |
| Incident On and Off a Mountain Road | 2006 | Comic book series and video adaptation | IDW Publishing; Masters of Horror #1-2, 4 issues Adapted by Chris Ryall. Video developed and directed by Don Coscarelli for Masters of Horror: Season 1, Episode 1 |

== Screenwriting ==
| Title | Year | Type | Episodes |
|---|---|---|---|
| Batman: The Animated Series | 1992-1995 | TV | 1992 - "Perchance to Dream"; 1993 - "Read My Lips"; 1995 - "Showdown" |
| Superman: The Animated Series | 1997 | TV | "Identity Crisis" |
| The New Batman Adventures | 1998 | TV | Critters |
| Jonah Hex: Motion Comics | 2010 | | |
| Son of Batman | 2014 | Direct-to-DVD Film | |
| Creepers | 2014 | Film | |
| Hap and Leonard | 2016-2018 | TV | Co-creator, writer - Pie a la Mojo (2017) |

== Anthologies edited ==
| Title | Year | Type | Pages | Publisher/Notes |
|---|---|---|---|---|
| Best of the West | 1986 | Anthology | 178 | Doubleday Books |
| The New Frontier: The Best of Today's Western Fiction | 1989 | Anthology | 180 | Doubleday Books |
| Razored Saddles | 1989 | Anthology | 268 | Dark Horse Books with Pat LoBrutto |
| The West That Was: A Lively and Authoritative Story and Picture Album | 1993 | Non-fiction illustrated anthology | 320 | Wings Books with Thomas W. Knowles |
| Wild West Show! | 1994 | Non-fiction illustrated anthology | 240 | Random House Publishing with Thomas W. Knowles |
| Dark at Heart | 1991 | Anthology | 307 | Dark Harvest Books with Karen Lansdale |
| Weird Business | 1995 | Anthology | 420 | Mojo Press with Rick Klaw |
| The Horror Hall of Fame: The Stoker Winners (2004) | 2004 | Anthology | 336 | Cemetery Dance Publications |
| Retro-Pulp Tales | 2006 | Anthology | 235 | Subterranean Press limited edition |
| Lords of the Razor | 2006 | Anthology | 281 | Subterranean Press limited edition |
| Cross Plains Universe: Texans Celebrate Robert E. Howard | 2006 | Anthology | 295 | MonkeyBrain Books with Scott A. Cupp |
| Son of Retro Pulp Tales | 2009 | Anthology | 211 | Subterranean Press limited edition |
| Crucified Dreams | 2011 | Anthology | 384 | Tachyon Publications trade paperback |
| The Urban Fantasy Anthology | 2011 | Anthology | 432 | Tachyon Publications with Peter S. Beagle |
| The Horror Hall of Fame: The Bram Stoker Winners (2012) | 2012 | Anthology | 336 | Cemetery Dance Publications |

== Essays and memoirs ==
| Title | Year | Type | Pages | Publisher/Notes |
|---|---|---|---|---|
| Joe R. Lansdale: An Interview | 2015 | Interview | | Kipple Officina Libraria; English and Italian; Free Kindle download |
| Miracles Ain't What They Used To Be | 2016 | Essays and memoirs | 99 | PM Press Outspoken Author Series |
