= Prisoner 489 =

2014 novel by Joe R. Lansdale

- Artwork by Santiago Caruso
- Author: Joe R. Lansdale
- Illustrator: Santiago Caruso
- Cover artist: Santiago Caruso
- Language: English
- Genre: Horror Fiction
- Publisher: Dark Regions Press
- Publication date: 01/02/2015
- Publication place: United States
- Media type: Trade Paperback, ebook, limited edition, lettered edition
- Pages: 92
- ISBN: 978-1-62641-073-2
- Preceded by: Hot in December (2013)
- Followed by: Black Hat Jack (2014)

Prisoner 489 is a horror novella written by American author Joe R. Lansdale.

== Synopsis ==
On a prison island for the world's worst criminals, a prisoner is set for execution. After absorbing multiple surges of electricity and nearly knocking out power to the entire island, the prisoner dies. The prisoner is buried in the graveyard with a single marker bearing only three digits: 489. After the burial, a violent storm rocks the island and a staff member goes missing. The staff rushes into the storm searching for their lost comrade, but they instead discover that the burial site has been unearthed and the body is missing. With this horrific finding and the strange noises, the staff is unnerved. When the strange noises continue, the staff starts to think something is after them. Faced with an unknown threat, they soon must battle for their lives.

== Publishing information ==
This book is published by Dark Regions Press and is available as a lettered edition (sold out), a limited edition hardcover, and trade paperback. This work is part of Dark Regions Black Labyrinth Book II series.

== Artwork ==
The artwork and illustrations are by Argentinian artist Santiago Caruso.
