= Writer of the Purple Rage =

1994 collection of short works by Joe R. Lansdale

- First edition
- Author: Joe R. Lansdale
- Cover artist: Mark A. Nelson
- Language: English
- Genre: Short story collection
- Publisher: Cemetery Dance Publications
- Publication date: 1994
- Publication place: United States
- Media type: Print hardcover, limited edition, paperback
- Preceded by: Electric Gumbo: A Lansdale Reader (1994)
- Followed by: A Fistfull of Stories (and Articles) (1996)

Writer of the Purple Rage is a collection of short works by American author Joe R. Lansdale, published in 1994. It was nominated for a Bram Stoker Award in the "Fiction Collection" category. The title is a play on the Philip José Farmer novella "Riders of the Purple Wage", and before that, the Zane Grey novel Riders of the Purple Sage.

== Contents ==
- "Bubba Ho-Tep" (nominated for the Bram Stoker Award; originally published in The King Is Dead, ed. Paul M. Sammon, 1994)
- "By Bizarre Hands: play version" (originally published in Cold Blood, ed. Richard Chizmar, 1991)
- "The Diaper" or "The Adventure of the Little Rounder" (originally published in Nova Express Summer 1990)
- "Drive-In Date" (originally published in Night Visions 8, 1991)
- "Everybody Plays the Fool" (originally published in Thunder’s Shadow Collector’s Magazine February 1993)
- "Godzilla's Twelve Step Program" (first publication)
- "Hard On For Horror" (non-fiction; extended from shorter version)
- "In the Cold, Dark Time" (originally published in Dark Harvest Summer/Fall Preview: 1990)
- "Incident On and Off a Mountain Road" (originally published in Night Visions 8, 1991)
- "Love Doll: A Fable" (nominated for the Bram Stoker Award; originally published in Borderlands 2, ed. Thomas F. Monteleone, 1991)
- "The Man With Two Lives" (first publication)
- "Mister Weed-Eater" (originally published by Cahill Press, 1993)
- "The Phone Woman" (originally published in Night Visions 8, 1991)
- "Pilots" (with Dan Lowry; originally published in Stalkers, ed. Ed Gorman & Greenberg, 1989)
- "Steppin' Out, Summer, '68" (originally published in Night Visions 8, 1991)

This is the only collection which includes the short stories "The Diaper", "Everybody Plays the Fool", "Love Doll: A Fable" and "The Man With Two Lives", as well as the play version of "By Bizarre Hands".
