= Son of Retro Pulp Tales =

- Artwork by Timothy Truman
- Author: Joe R. Lansdale
- Cover artist: Tim Truman
- Language: English
- Genre: Horror, short story collection
- Publisher: Subterranean Press
- Publication date: 2009
- Publication place: United States
- Media type: Print hardcover, limited edition
- Pages: 211
- ISBN: 978-1-59606-260-3
- Preceded by: Cross Plains Universe: Texans Celebrate Robert E. Howard (with Scott A. Cupp, (2006)
- Followed by: Crucified Dreams (2011)

Son Of Retro Pulp Tales is a collection of short fiction edited by Joe R. Lansdale and his son Keith Lansdale. Continuing in the same vein as the earlier book titled Retro Pulp Tales, these stories are more in the tradition of early pulp stories in cheap magazines and pre-1960s horror films. This book was published exclusively by Subterranean Press.

== Table of Contents ==
- Introduction- Keith Lansdale
- The Crawling Sky- Joe R. Lansdale
- Quiet Bullets- Christopher Golden
- A Gunfight- David J. Schow
- The Forgotten Kingdom- Mike Resnick
- The Perfect Nanny- William F. Nolen
- Border Town- James Grady
- The Catastrophe Box- Cherie Priest
- Pretty Green Eyes- Timothy Truman
- The Brown Bomber and the Nazi Werewolf of the S.S.- Matt Venne
- The Lizard Men of Blood River- Stephen Mertz
- The Toad Prince or, Sex Queen of the Martian Pleasure Domes- Harlan Ellison
