= Atomic Chili =

1998 collection of previously written stories by Joe R. Lansdale

Atomic Chili: The Illustrated Joe R. Lansdale
- Author: Joe R. Lansdale, edited by Rick Klaw
- Illustrator: Designed by John Picacio, many artists contributed
- Cover artist: Dave Dorman
- Language: English
- Genre: Graphic Novel
- Publisher: Mojo Press
- Publication date: December 31, 1998
- Publication place: United States
- Media type: Print graphic novel/trade paperback
- Pages: 300
- ISBN: 978-1885418067
- Preceded by: By Bizarre Hands
- Followed by: Dog, Cat, and Baby

Atomic Chili: The Illustrated Joe R. Lansdale by Lansdale et al., (Klaw, ed.) (Mojo Press, 1998) is a collection of previously written stories by Joe R. Lansdale, adapted into comic book form by assorted artists and writers. The book was designed by John Picacio, and featured a cover by Dave Dorman.

== Previous availability ==
Although a new collection, much of Atomic Chili's content had been previously available in some form. The "Dead in the West" adaptation by Neal Barrett, Jr. and Jack "Jaxon" Jackson had been published by Dark Horse Comics as a two-issue mini-series in 1991. "By Bizarre Hands", "Night They Missed the Horror Show", and "Tight Little Stitches" were also previously published by Dark Horse as the 3-issue By Bizarre Hands mini-series (1994).

Three stories had been previously published in collections from Mojo Press: "Trains Not Taken" was included in Wild West Show by Richard Klaw (ed.) (1996); "Steel Valentine" appeared in Weird Business by Joe R. Lansdale and Richard Klaw (ed.s)) (1995); and "The Grease Trap" had seen print in Mojo's debut title, Creature Features, by Richard Klaw (ed.) (1994).

"Pilots" and "The Job" originated in this collection. "The Grease Trap" was never printed as a text story and was originally published as a comic book story.

== Contents ==
- "Introduction" by Timothy Truman
- "The Grease Trap" (art by Ted Naifeh)
- "Trains Not Taken" (adapted by Neal Barrett, Jr.) (art by John Garcia)
- "By Bizarre Hands" (adapted by Jerry Prosser) (art by Dean Rohrer)
- "Night They Missed the Horror Show" (adapted by Jerry Prosser) (art by Marc Erickson)
- Dead in the West (adapted by Neal Barrett, Jr.) (art by Jack "Jaxon" Jackson)
- "Tight Little Stitches in a Dead Man's Back" (adapted by Neal Barrett Jr.) (art by Phil Hester)
- "Pilots" (co-wr: Dan Lowry) (adapted by Richard Klaw) (art by Tom Foxmarnick)
- "Steel Valentine" (adapted by Rick Klaw) (art by Marc Erickson)
- "The Job" (adapted by Rick Klaw) (art by John Lucas and William Traxtle)

Also included is a gallery of ten artistic interpretations of Lansdale's creation God of the Razor. Contributors include: Stephen Bissette, Mark Nelson, George Pratt, Fernando Ramirez, Timothy Truman, and Michael Zulli.

== Subsequent availability ==
Dead in the West was subsequently re-printed by Night Shade Press in 2005. (ISBN 1-59780-014-7)
