= The Best of Joe R. Lansdale =

2010 collection of short stories by Joe R. Lansdale

- First edition
- Author: Joe R. Lansdale
- Cover artist: John Picacio
- Language: English
- Genre: Horror, contains short stories
- Publisher: Tachyon Publications
- Publication date: 2010
- Publication place: United States
- Media type: Print Trade paperback
- Pages: 369
- ISBN: 978-1-892391-94-0
- Preceded by: Unchained and Unhinged (2009)
- Followed by: Deadman's Road (2010)

The Best of Joe R. Lansdale is a collection of short stories published exclusively by Tachyon Publications as a trade paperback in 2010. This collection contains many classic short fiction published by Mr. Lansdale over the last 20 years and contains many of his most popular and famous works.

== Table of contents ==
- Crucified Dreams: Introduction by Joe R. Lansdale
- Godzilla's Twelve-Step Program
- Bubba Ho-Tep| Link to video article
- Mad Dog Summer
- Fire Dog
- The Big Blow
- Duck Hunt
- Incident On and Off a Mountain Road| Link to video article
- The Events Concerning a Nude Foldout found in a Harlequin Romance
- White Mule, Spotted Pig
- On the Far Side of the Cadillac Desert With Dead Folks
- Not From Detroit
- Cowboy
- Steppin' Out, Summer, '68
- Fish Night
- Hell Through a Windshield
- Night They Missed the Horror Show
