= Crawling Sky =

Book by Joe R. Lansdale

- Cover art by Brian Denham
- Author: Joe R. Lansdale
- Illustrator: Brian Denham
- Cover artist: Brian Denham
- Language: English
- Genre: Horror
- Publisher: Antarctic Press
- Publication date: 2013
- Publication place: United States
- Media type: Full sized paperback
- Pages: 51
- ISBN: 978-0-930655-10-5

Crawling Sky is a graphic novel adapted from a short story by Joe R. Lansdale by his son Keith Lansdale. It follows the further adventures of the Reverend Jedidiah Mercer. In this story he ventures into a decrepit unnamed town in East Texas. He soon learns the entire town is possessed by an evil entity. The Reverend soon meets Mary and Norville who agree to help him in any way they can. They go to a cabin in an area right in the middle of the evil powers hold sway. They soon trap the monster and dump it into a well. Later, the monster climbs out and an intense battle takes place.

== Editions ==
This story was originally published as a 5 issue comic book series. The story was also published in the short story collection Deadman's Road by Joe R. Lansdale in the Subterranean Press re-issue.
