= Lost Echoes =

2007 crime novel by Joe R. Lansdale

- limited edition by Subterranean Press
- Author: Joe R. Lansdale
- Cover artist: J.K. Potter
- Language: English
- Genre: Novel
- Publisher: Subterranean Press, Vintage Crime/Black Lizard
- Publication date: 2007
- Publication place: United States
- Media type: Print Hardcover, Trade Paperback
- Pages: 330
- ISBN: 978-0-307-27544-8
- Preceded by: Sunset and Sawdust (2004)
- Followed by: Leather Maiden (2008)

Lost Echoes is a 2007 crime/mystery novel by American author Joe R. Lansdale. It was first printed as a limited edition and trade hardcover by Subterranean Press. It was later reissued as a trade paperback by Vintage Crime/Black Lizard publications. The Subterranean editions have long since sold out.

== Plot summary ==
Since a mysterious childhood illness Harry Wilkes has experienced horrific visions of gruesome murders and other horrible scenes. In college Harry turns to alcohol to suppress the visions and deal with the enormous stress that comes with it. One night at a bar he witnesses a fellow drunk easily fending off three would–be muggers. The man, whose name is Tad, turns out to be a student and expert of the martial arts. Harry strikes up a friendship with Tad who later becomes his sensei and teaches him to master his unusual gift. Soon a woman Harry had a crush on in his childhood comes asking him to help solve her father's murder. Unsure of how this will affect him, Harry and Tad find themselves involved in a horrible crime and murder. The question is will Harry's ability help him cope with the situation or contribute to his downfall.

Vintage Crime/Black Lizard edition

== Sources ==
- What's That Sound?, Esquire magazine, February 28, 2007
- Lost Echoes by Joe R. Lansdale – review, Spinetingler magazine, December 14, 2010
- Lost Echoes (starred review), Publishers Weekly, February 1, 2007
