= By Bizarre Hands Rides Again =

Collection of stories by Joe R. Lansdale

- Author: Joe R. Lansdale
- Illustrator: Alex McVey
- Cover artist: Alex McVey
- Language: English
- Genre: Horror, short story collection
- Publisher: Bloodletting Press/ Morning Star Press
- Publication date: September 2010
- Publication place: United States
- Media type: Print hardcover, limited edition
- Pages: 360
- Preceded by: Deadman's Road (2010)
- Followed by: Trapped in the Saturday Matinee (2012)

By Bizarre Hands Rides Again is a collection of short stories and two novellas written by American author Joe R. Lansdale. It is a re-issue of his first short story collection with a new introduction, four additional stories, illustrations, and a different cover. It is limited to 300 numbered copies and 26 lettered editions with a custom leather slipcase.

== Table of contents ==
- New introduction by Joe R. Lansdale
- Original introduction by Lewis Shiner
- Morning, Noon, and Night (new story)
- Fish Night
- The Pit
- Duck Hunt
- By Bizarre Hands
- The Steel Valentine
- I Tell you It's Love
- Letters From the South, Two Moons West of Nacogdoches
- Boys Will be Boys
- The Fat Man and the Elephant
- Hell Through a Windshield
- Down by the Sea Near the Great Big Rock
- Trains Not taken
- Tight Little Stitches in a Dead Man's Back
- The Windstorm Passes
- Night They Missed the Horror Show
- On the Far Side of the Cadillac Desert With Dead Folks (novella)
- Starlight, Eye Bright (new story)
- Not From Detroit (additional story)
- King of Shadows (additional novella)
