= Driving to Geronimo's Grave and Other Stories =

- Cover art by Ken Laager
- Authors: Joe R. Lansdale
- Cover artist: Ken Laager
- Genre: Horror Fiction, Novellas
- Publisher: Subterranean Press
- Publication date: 2018
- Media type: Limited edition, Ebook
- Pages: 272
- ISBN: 978-1-59606-890-2
- Preceded by: Terror is Our Business (2018)
- Followed by: Cosmic Interruptions (2018)

Driving to Geronimo's Grave and Other Stories is a collection of novellas written by American author Joe R. Lansdale. It was published as a limited edition by Subterranean Press with 1,500 copies printed. The book covers a range of subjects with suspense and horror being the main theme .

== Background ==
The title story, "Driving to Geronimo's Grave", appeared earlier in Patrick Milikin's collection The Highway Kind: Tales Of Fast Cars, Desperate Drivers, And Dark Roads.

The cover was illustrated by artist Ken Laager. The novellas were inspired by authors such as H.P. Lovecraft and by Lansdale's parents, who lived through The Great Depression.

It marks the 30th collection of short stories and novellas Lansdale has published since 1989's By Bizarre Hands. Many have been released in small printings or limited editions and are sought after by collectors. Lansdale's latest, Comic Interruptions, was released in the U.K. by SST Publications.

== Contents ==
- Introduction
- "Driving to Geronimo's Grave"
- "In the Mad Mountains"
- "Wrestling Jesus"
- "Robo Rabid"
- "The Projectionist"
- "Everything Sparkles in Hell"

== Reception ==
High Country News named Driving to Geronimo’s Grave one of the 2018 fall season’s "best new books."

Publishers Weekly, in its book review, wrote that the author "provides consistent entertainment for readers of all genres, not only in his fiction but also in the chatty intro and in afterwords of each yarn." Kirkus Reviews opined, "Eras such as the Depression and the 1950s are evoked in terms that have less to do with naturalism than with popular iconography. The effect might not always be convincing, but it's pleasing."

San Francisco Book Review's editor Chris Hayden wrote that "Lansdale brings his East Texas noir style to another dynamite collection of short stories that show off his humor, his range, and his creativity."

Driving to Geronimo's Grave has also been reviewed by Booklist.
