= Trapped in the Saturday Matinee =

2012 collection of short stories by Joe R. Lansdale

- Author: Joe R. Lansdale
- Illustrator: Alex McVey
- Cover artist: Alex McVey
- Language: English
- Genre: Horror, short story collection
- Publisher: PS Publishing
- Publication date: 2012
- Publication place: United Kingdom
- Media type: Print hardcover, limited edition
- Pages: 271
- ISBN: 978-1-906301-93-4
- Preceded by: By Bizarre Hands Rides Again (2012)
- Followed by: Bleeding Shadows (November 2013)

Trapped in the Saturday Matinee is a collection of short stories written by American author Joe R. Lansdale. In the introduction Mr. Lansdale states "This collection gathers together some early work, which I like, and it also contains stories, for one reason or another, missed their audience. There are also newer material that I treasure, some that has never been gathered under one roof, and there are others written specifically for this volume."

"I love this collection. It’s a mixture of nostalgia and maturity, the reworking of others’ work and the discovery of my own voice. I like to write introductions as a way of inviting you into my house of stories. But now I’ll leave you to it. Just wander from room to room, and take your time. While you’re here, make yourself at home. But please . . . try not to break the furniture on your way out."

== Editions ==
This book is published as a limited edition and as a trade hardcover by PS Publishing in the U.K. and is available in The U.S. through Subterranean Press.

== Table of contents ==
- Introduction: Good Ju-Ju
- The Junkyard
- The Valley of the Swastika
- Duck Footed
- Dog
- It Washed Up
- Way Down There
- A Hard-On for Horror: Low Budget Excitement
- Edgar Allan Poe's Shadow and The Aluminum Chair Factory Collide: One Survivor, Weak in the Knees with Pen and Paper
- Once Upon a time
- The Drunken Moon
- Christmas Monkey
- I tell You It's Love
- The White Rabbit
- Everybody Plays The fool
- Pentecostal Punk Rock
- Jiving with Shadows and Dragons and Long dark Trains
- Dirt Devils
- Trapped In The Saturday Matinee
- The Devil's Pants
- Family
- The Hunt: Before And The Aftermath
