= The Shadows, Kith and Kin =

2007 collection of short fiction by Joe R. Lansdale

- Artwork by Mark A. Nelson
- Author: Joe R. Lansdale
- Cover artist: Mark A. Nelson
- Language: English
- Genre: Horror, short story collection
- Publisher: Subterranean Press
- Publication date: 2007
- Publication place: United States
- Media type: Print hardcover, limited edition
- Pages: 287
- ISBN: 978-1-59606-081-4
- Preceded by: The God of the Razor (2007)
- Followed by: Sanctified and Chicken-Fried (2009)

The Shadows, Kith and Kin is a collection of short fiction by Joe R. Lansdale, published in 2007 in a limited edition by Subterranean Press. This book has long since sold out.

It contains:

- A Quick Author's Note
- "The Shadows, Kith and Kin"
- "Deadman's Road"
- "The Long Dead Day"
- "White Mule, Spotted Pig"
- "Bill, the Little Steam Shovel" (illustrated by Mark A. Nelson)
- "Alone" (with Melissa Mia Hall)
- "The Events Concerning a Nude Fold-Out Found in a Harlequin Romance"
- "The Gentleman's Hotel"

"The Events Concerning a Nude Fold-Out Found in a Harlequin Romance" was previously included in his 1993 paperback collection Bestsellers Guaranteed. It was also included in Electric Gumbo (1994) and The Long Ones (1999).
