= Fender Lizards =

2015 novel by Joe R. Lansdale

- Author: Joe R. Lansdale
- Cover artist: Jon Foster
- Language: English
- Genre: Coming-of-age novel
- Publisher: Subterranean Press
- Publication date: 2015
- Publication place: United States
- Media type: ebook, hardcover
- Pages: 230
- ISBN: 978-1-59606-717-2
- Preceded by: Paradise Sky (2015)
- Followed by: Hell's Bounty (2016)

Fender Lizards is a novel written by American author Joe R. Lansdale. It tells the story of 17-year-old Dorothy "Dot" Sherman growing up in East Texas.

== Plot synopsis ==
17-year-old Dot Sherman is growing up in a small town in East Texas, living in a double wide trailer with her mother, grandmother, and little brother. When she was 12 her father went to get a pack of cigarettes and never returned. Dot works at the local "Dairy Bob" named after Bob the owner. All the girls serve their customers on roller skates and have nicknamed themselves "Fender Lizards". The story is told from Dot's narrative point of view.

One day Dot's uncle Elbert shows up and parks his van in her front yard and Dot is eager for information about her absentee father. Elbert claims to have just been released from prison for a botched bank robbery. One day Dot's older sister Raylynn shows up for work at the Dairy Bob with bruises and black eyes. Dot goes and fetches Raylynn's kids and returns to her sister's trailer. She hides and waits for Raylynn's husband to come home drunk and then beats him senseless with a couple of 2 by 4's. Raylynn and her kids then move into the already crowded trailer. One day notices go up that a circus is coming to town featuring a women's Roller Derby team. Dot and the other Fender Lizards decide to train to take on the roller derby team coming to town with a prize of $10,000 for any team that beats them. Elbert used to roller skate as a circus clown and agrees to train the girls.

== Editions ==
This book was published by Subterranean Press as both hardcover and limited editions. Both editions have sold out from the publisher. It is still available as an e-book.
