= The Ape Man's Brother =

2013 novella by Joe R. Lansdale

- Subterranean Press ebook edition
- Author: Joe R. Lansdale
- Cover artist: Ken Lagger
- Language: English
- Genre: Science fiction
- Publisher: Subterranean Press
- Publication date: 2013
- Publication place: United States
- Media type: Ebook, hardcover 31 January 2014
- ISBN: 978-1-59606-5512
- Preceded by: In Waders From Mars (Children’s Book) (2012)
- Followed by: The Thicket (September 2013)

The Ape Man's Brother is a 2013 novella written by American author Joe R. Lansdale. This novel was published as an ebook by and a hard copy Subterranean Press. 31 January 2014.

== Plot synopsis ==
Bill, the protagonist and narrator, lives on an undiscovered island. Bill's people are an undiscovered race of humanoids and live a primitive life. All that changes when an airplane crash lands on the island. The only survivor is an infant. Bill's mother, who just lost a young baby, takes the child in and raises it as her own. Bill's people notice a curious lack of body hair, but soon the young human is accepted among Bill's people. As he grows up he is simply called The Big Guy. Bill and The Big Guy become friends. The Big Guy shows an aptitude for hunting and adopts the natives ways. Things become very complicated when an expedition traveling in a zeppelin lands on the island. One of the explorers is a beautiful woman who becomes known as The Woman. When a giant flying lizard tries to carry The Woman off, The Big Guy rescues her and they begin a torrid affair much to the dislike of the other men in the expedition. Soon Bill and The Big Guy accompany the expedition to New York City. The affair between The Big Guy and The Woman causes big trouble as Bill and The Big Guy try to adapt to a civilized way of life.
