= Bleeding Shadows =

2013 short story collection by Joe R. Lansdale

- Author: Joe R. Lansdale
- Cover artist: Vincent Chong
- Language: English
- Genre: Horror
- Publisher: Subterranean Press
- Publication date: 28 November 2013
- Publication place: United States
- Media type: Print hardcover, limited edition
- Pages: 480
- ISBN: 978-1-596065-99-4
- Preceded by: Trapped in the Saturday Matinee

Bleeding Shadows is a short story collection by American author Joe R. Lansdale. It was published by Subterranean Press on 28 November 2013. This volume contains 30 short stories that span Lansdale's extensive career. This book is the largest collection of Mr. Lansdale's short stories available to date.

Wraparound dust jacket of limited edition by Vincent Chong.

== Contents ==
- Introduction
- "Torn Away"
- "The Bleeding Shadow"
- "A Visit with Friends"
- "Christmas Monkeys"
- "Christmas with the Dead"
- "Quarry"
- "Six Finger Jack"
- "Mr. Bear"
- "Old Man in the Motorized Chair"
- "Apache Witch"
- "Soldierin’"
- "Death Before Bed"
- "Apocalypse 195"
- "A Strange Poem"
- "Little Words"
- "The Man"
- "Dead Air"
- "Dog in Winter"
- "Hide and Horns"
- "The Stars are Falling"
- "Metal Men of Mars"
- "Morning, Noon, and Night"
- "Santa at the Café"
- "What Happened to Me"
- "Oink"
- "Star Light, Eyes Bright"
- "Dead Sister"
- "Shooting Pool"
- "The Folding Man (Based on the black car legend)"
- "Dread Island"
- "Story Notes"

== Issues ==
This collection was released by Subterranean Press as both a limited edition with 250 signed numbered copies, with an exclusive wraparound dust jacket, housed in a custom slipcase, and as a fully cloth bound hardcover trade edition. As of November 1 the trade edition is already sold out from the publisher but will be available online.
