= Nat Love =

American cowboy (1854–1921)

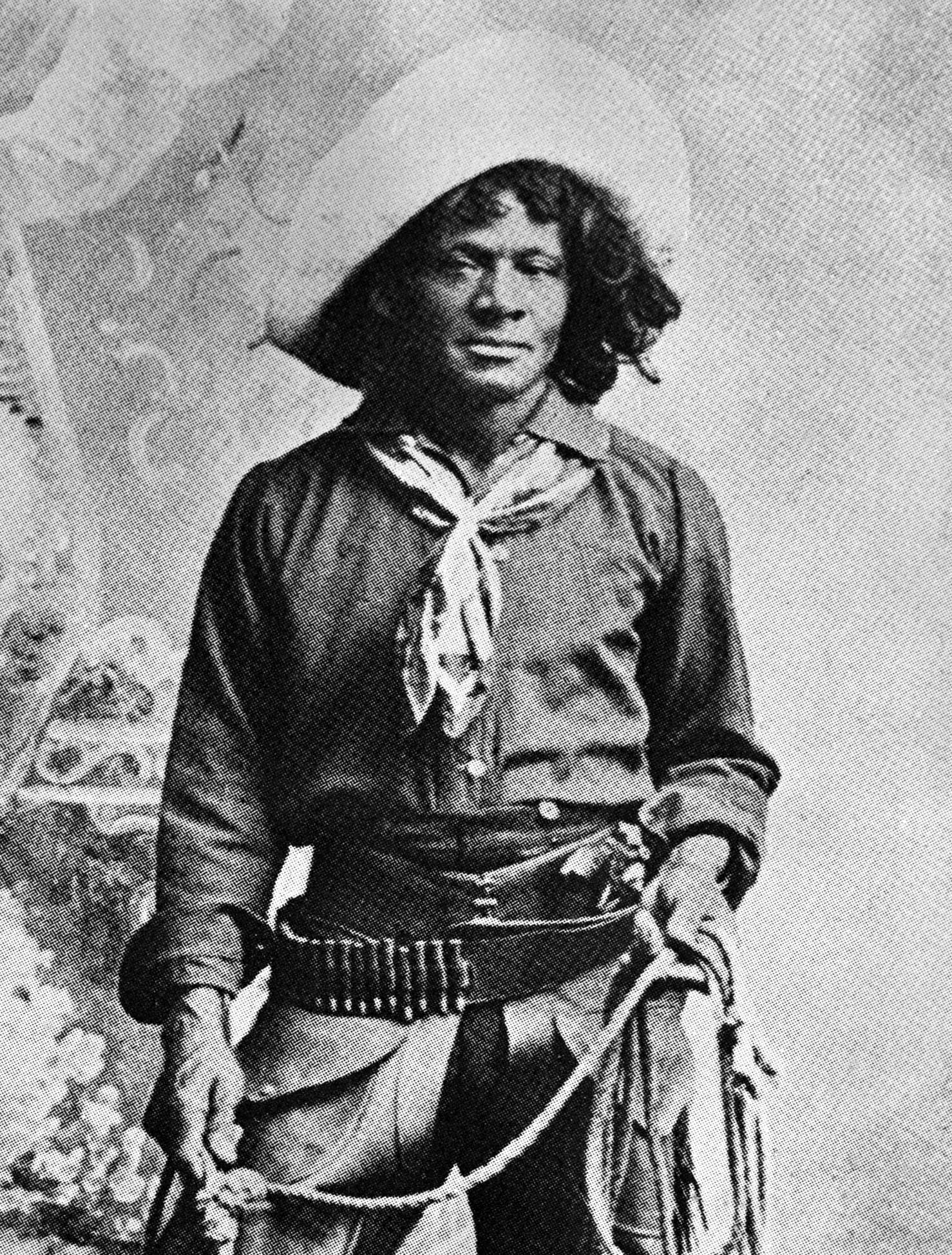
- Love c. 1907
- Born: June 14, 1854; Davidson County, Tennessee
- Died: February 11, 1921 (aged 66); Santa Monica, California, U.S.
- Other names: Red River Dick; Deadwood Dick
- Occupations: cowboy, rodeo performer, pullman porter, author
- Years active: 1866–1921

Nat Love (Note: Sometimes found written—and pronounced—as Nate Love.) (June 14, 1854 – February 11, 1921) was an American cowboy and writer active in the period following the Civil War. His reported exploits have made him one of the more famous heroes of the Old West.

== Early life ==
Nat Love, (pronounced "Nate") was born into slavery on the plantation of Robert Love in Davidson County, Tennessee on June 14, 1854. His father was a slave foreman who worked in the plantation's fields, and his mother was the manager of its kitchen. Love had two siblings: an older sister, Sally, and an older brother, Jordan.

Despite slavery-era statutes that outlawed black literacy, he learned to read and write as a child with the help of Sampson, his father. When slavery ended, Love's parents stayed on the Love plantation as sharecroppers, attempting to raise tobacco and corn on about 20 acres, but Sampson died shortly after the second crop was planted. Afterward, Nat took a second job working on a local farm to help make ends meet. At about this time, he was noted as having a gift for breaking horses. After some time of working extra odd jobs in the area, he won a horse in a raffle on two occasions, which he then sold back to the owner for $50 each time. He used the money to leave town, and at the age of 16, he headed to the Western United States.

== Life as a cowboy ==
Love traveled to Dodge City, Kansas, where he found work as a cowboy with cattle drivers from the Duval Ranch (located on the Palo Duro River in the Texas Panhandle). According to his autobiography, Love fought cattle rustlers and endured inclement weather. He trained himself to become an expert marksman and cowboy, for which he earned from his co-workers the moniker Red River Dick. In 1872, Love moved to Arizona, where he found work at the Gallinger Ranch located along the Gila River. He wrote in his autobiography that he met Pat Garrett, Bat Masterson, Billy the Kid, and others while working the cattle drives in Arizona.

=== "Deadwood Dick" ===
After driving a herd of cattle to the rail head in Deadwood, Dakota Territory, he claimed to have entered a rodeo on the 4th of July in 1876, enticed by the $200 prize money. The only difficulty with this story is that Deadwood newspapers, which covered every event of the Fourth of July celebrations, make no mention of a rodeo that day. He claimed to have won the rope, throw, tie, bridle, saddle, and bronco riding contests. It was at this rodeo that he claims friends and fans gave him the nickname "Deadwood Dick", a reference to a literary character created by Edward Lytton Wheeler, a dime novelist of the day. (Note: Scholars Philip Durham and Everett L. Jones believe that after the rodeo, Love laid claim to the Wheeler character's nickname to help sensationalize the events of his own life, although they don't believe the autobiographical book is wholly discredited by this. See: Durham, Philip, and Everett L. Jones; The Negro Cowboys; New York: Dodd, Mead & Company; (1965))

=== Capture and escape ===
Mounted on my horse my ... lariat near my hand, and my trusty guns in my belt ... I felt like I could defy the world.

In October 1877, Nat Love wrote that he was captured by a band of Pima Indians while rounding up stray cattle near the Gila River in Arizona. Although he claimed to have received over 14 bullet wounds in his career (with "several" received in his fight with the Native Americans while trying to avoid capture), Love wrote that his life was spared because the Indians respected his heritage, a large portion of the band themselves being of mixed blood. He almost married the chief's daughter. The band of Native Americans nursed him back to health, wishing to adopt him into the tribe. Eventually, Love writes, he stole a pony and escaped into West Texas.

== Life after being a cowboy ==
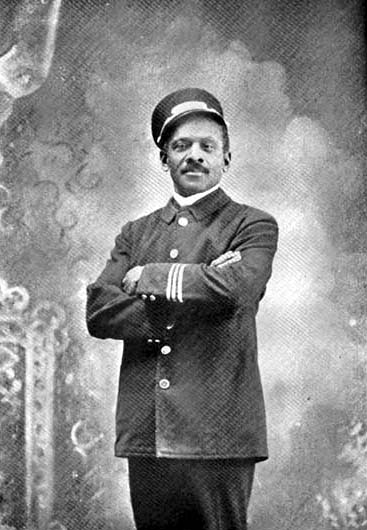
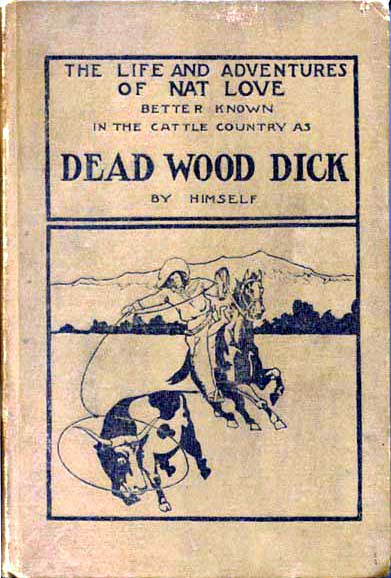
Love during his career as pullman porter (left); Book cover of his autobiography, published in 1907 (right)

Love left the cowboy life before he settled down and married a woman named Alice Owens, in Denver, Colorado, on August 2, 1888. They lived in Denver initially. He then took a job in 1890 as a Pullman porter, which involved overseeing sleeping cars on the Denver and Rio Grande Railroad. While working for the railroad, he and his family resided in several western states, before finally moving to southern California.

In 1907, Love published his autobiography titled Life and Adventures of Nat Love, Better Known in the Cattle Country as 'Deadwood Dick,' by Himself, which greatly enhanced his legacy. Love spent the latter part of his life as a courier and guard for a securities company in Los Angeles. He died there in 1921 at the age of 66.

== In popular culture ==
=== Written ===
Joe R. Lansdale used Love as a character in the story, Nine Hide and Horns, published in the anthology book Subterranean Online (2009); Soldierin, published in the anthology book Warriors (2010); the novella, Black Hat Jack (2014); and the novel, Paradise Sky (2015).

In 2012, his story was featured in the graphic novel Best Shot in the West by Patricia and Fredrick McKissack (script) and Randy DuBurke (drawings).

In 2022, the Denver Art Museum displayed Nat Love, A Cowboy's Life, a comic adaptation of his autobiography, written and drawn by R. Alan Brooks and colored by Lonnie MF Allen.

=== Film ===
In the television movie The Cherokee Kid (1996), Nat Love is portrayed by Ernie Hudson.

In They Die by Dawn (2013), Love is portrayed by Michael K. Williams.

Jonathan Majors portrayed Nat Love in the film The Harder They Fall (2021).

== See also ==
- Isom Dart
- Bill Pickett
- Bose Ikard
- Black cowboys
