= Edge of Dark Water =

2012 novel by Joe R. Lansdale

- Mulholland Books edition
- Author: Joe R. Lansdale
- Language: English
- Genre: Murder mystery
- Publisher: Mulholland Books
- Publication date: March 2012
- Publication place: United States
- Media type: Print (Hardcover)
- Pages: 292
- ISBN: 978-0-316-18843-2
- Preceded by: All the Earth, Thrown to the Sky(2011)
- Followed by: In Waders From Mars (Children’s Book)(2012)

Edge of Dark Water is a murder/mystery novel written by American author Joe R. Lansdale. It was published by Mulholland Books in March 2012. A limited edition has been issued by British publisher PS Publications. It was recognized as a Booklist Editors' Choice: Adult Books for Young Adults by the American Library Association.

== Plot summary ==
The novel is set during the Great Depression in East Texas. Teenager Sue Ellen and her friends discover the body of May Lynn, one of their friends, tied to a Singer Sewing Machine in the Sabine River. May Lynn had had dreams of running off to Hollywood to be a movie star. So the group of young people decide to take May Lynn's ashes to Hollywood to fulfill her final dream. After finding and taking a large amount of stolen money, they set out on their adventure pursued by a psychopathic killer named Skunk who is hell-bent on recovering the money for himself.

PS Publishing cover

== Editions ==
This book is published in the United States by Mulholland Books and by PS Publishing in the U.K. It was re-issued as a trade paperback by Mulholland 12 February 2013. The song Edge of Dark Water was penned by Joe's Daughter Kasey Lansdale and is available for a free download through link/qr code form in the American and British trade paperback editions.
