= Paradise Sky =

2015 novel by Joe R. Lansdale

- Author: Joe R. Lansdale
- Language: English
- Genre: Western fiction
- Publisher: Mulholland Books
- Publication date: 2015
- Publication place: United States
- Media type: ebook, hardcover
- Pages: 400
- ISBN: 978-0-316-32937-8
- Preceded by: Black Hat Jack

Paradise Sky is a novel written by American author Joe R. Lansdale, published by Mulholland Books. It takes place in the post American Civil War era.

== Plot synopsis ==
Young Willie, the son of a slave in East Texas, is caught looking at the rear end of a white woman. Her husband, Sam Ruggert, a racist former rebel soldier, catches him looking and immediately calls for his lynching. Willie runs home and tells his father what has happened. His father, knowing what will happen, sends him running before the posse shows up. Willie later returns home only to discover Ruggert and his men have brutally murdered his father and burned down their cabin. So Willie outruns his pursuers is taken in by a man named Loving. Loving teaches him to read, write, and shoot. Loving becomes a father figure and mentor. 4 years later Loving shoots himself after discovering he has cancer. Being a wanted man, Willie changes his name to Nat Love and head west to join the army and becomes a buffalo soldier. However while on patrol his unit attacked by Apache Indians and is almost wiped out. Nat figures he'll be blamed for the incident and deserts. He heads north to the small mining town of Deadwood, South Dakota where he is befriended by Wild Bill Hickok. He meets and falls in love with a woman, but then discovers that Ruggert, a man with a long memory, is still pursuing him. Ruggert and his men eventually catch up to Nat and his bride to be. After leaving Nat for dead, they kidnap, rape, and torture Nat's woman. Bent on revenge Nat, now nicknamed Deadwood Dick for winning a shooting contest, pursues Ruggert and his men for a final and deadly showdown.

== Publication history ==
The novel is published by Mulholland Books as both a hardcover and an e-book. Nat Love also is featured in the novella Black Hat Jack published by Subterranean Press.

The Western Writers of America gave this book a Spur Award for Best Historical Novel of 2016.
