= The Donut Legion =

2023 novel by Joe R. Lansdale

- Author: Joe R. Lansdale
- Language: English
- Genre: Mystery/suspense/comedy
- Publisher: Mulholland Books
- Publication date: 2023
- Publication place: United States
- Media type: Print
- ISBN: 9780316540681

The Donut Legion is a comedy-mystery novel by American author Joe R. Lansdale.

== Premise ==
The novel concerns a missing persons investigation centered on a Texas cult that claims knowledge of a flying saucer.

Lansdale has stated that his interest in and judgments of cults—including Pizzagate, QAnon, and Jim Jones—inspired the novel.

== Critical reception ==
In a positive review, the Associated Press said "Lansdale's prose is tight, he has laced his highly entertaining story with sly humor, and he has populated it with a cast of quirky characters." Similarly, Gabino Iglesias of Locus called the novel a "master class" in "impeccable character development [with] a philosophical touch," and named it "one of Lansdale's best, most entertaining standalone novels."

Conversely, Kirkus criticized "the otherworldly aspects of the [novel's] mystery [as] seriously muddled, and the whodunit, which might better be labeled a whathappened, [as] seriously disappointing."

== Future ==
According to Lansdale, a sequel novel entitled The Midnight Stars is forthcoming.
