= Dave Dorman =

American illustrator (born 1958)

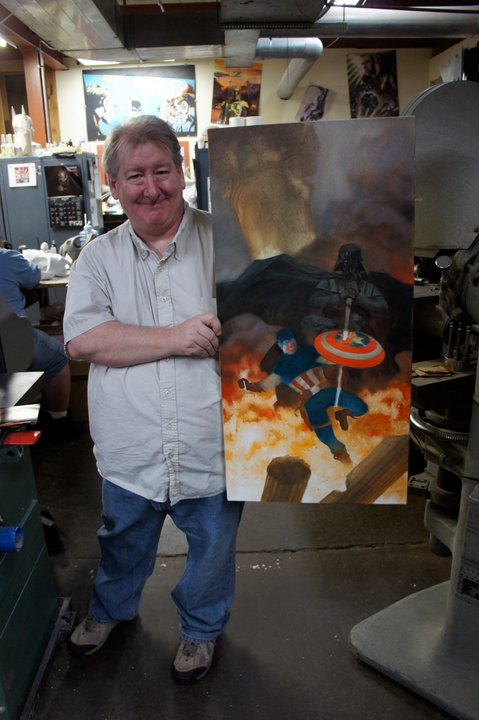
- Dave Dorman with his Captain America v. Darth Vader painting 2011
- Born: 1958 (age 67–68) Michigan, U.S.
- Areas: Writer, Penciller, Artist, Inker, Colourist
- Notable works: Star Wars: The Art of Dave Dorman, Rolling Thunder: The Art of Dave Dorman
- Awards: Eisner Award, 1993; Inkpot Award, 2010

Dave Dorman (born 1958 in Michigan) is a science fiction, horror and fantasy illustrator best known for his Star Wars artwork.

== Early life ==
Dorman's parents are Air Force Lieutenant Colonel Jack N. Dorman and Phyllis Dorman. Both parents are deceased. Dorman is married to award-winning TV/video producer, writer and publicist Denise (McDonald) Dorman of WriteBrain Media. He has a son, Jack, who was born in 2004.

Dorman's father Jack Dorman was renowned for his work and awards in the field of radio-controlled airplanes. Jack Dorman created historically accurate interiors for the planes and was an expert at model building. Dorman attributes his attention to detail to his father and credits both parents with giving him emotional and financial support early in his career. Together, Dorman and his father won numerous awards for their model building projects.

Dorman attended St. Mary's Seminary and University in Maryland and The Kubert School in New Jersey. Dorman also taught a week-long seminar at the art department of Savannah College of Art and Design in the mid-1990s. The head of the art department at the time was Durwin Talon. Dorman has been asked to teach workshops at Flashpoint Academy and the American Academy of Art, both in Chicago, Illinois. He is also a co-founder of Comix Academy, along with Durwin Talon, Scott Hampton and Christopher Moeller and John van Fleet. This is a master class in comic book illustration.

== Career ==
Dorman attended a graphic arts program at St. Mary's College in Maryland, but left after a year because it did not have an illustration component. Next, he attended The Kubert School in New Jersey, but left after one year because their curriculum only taught black and white illustration and Dorman wanted to be a cover artist. As an illustrator, he describes himself as self-taught.

Dorman began his professional career in 1979, and has done illustration for comic book companies Marvel, DC, and Dark Horse, but his break came in 1983, when his artwork first appeared on the cover of Heavy Metal magazine. Hasbro commissioned Dorman to paint over 100 pieces realistic artwork for its 3-inch series of G.I. Joe action figures in the mid-1980s. In 1994, Dorman was commissioned to do the artwork for a series of 90 trading cards for the Ultraverse comic book setting. In 1996, Hasbro asked Dorman to create more artwork for its 12-inch G.I. Joe collector series.

Although he has produced art based on such characters as Indiana Jones, Batman, and Superman, he became most well known for his Star Wars artwork. The Star Wars Art of Dave Dorman was published in 1996 by Random House/FPG. Dorman won a poll of the readers of The Official Best of Star Wars Magazine in 1998, as "Best Star Wars Artist". Dorman won an Eisner Award in 1993 for his paintings in the book Aliens: Tribes. In 2010 he won the prestigious Inkpot Award at San Diego Comic-Con, where he was a featured guest that year. During that show, he also launched his new career retrospective book, ROLLING THUNDER: The Art of Dave Dorman, which is published by IDW Publishing and Desperado Publishing.

Dorman began his roleplaying game (RPG) work beginning with Pacesetter Ltd in 1985, and began freelancing for TSR in 1987, producing cover art for Dungeons & Dragons books as Gargoyle and the original Draconomicon, among others. Dorman also did artwork for the games Shadowrun (FASA), Torg (West End Games, or WEG), Champions (Hero Games), Mayfair Games' "Role Aids", Rifts (Palladium Books), and Blood of Heroes. Dorman also produced all the art for some of West End Games' Star Wars role-playing game supplements in the 1990s. He did some illustrations for the Micronauts toy line in the early 2000s.

Dorman has been known for more than 20 years because of his photo-realistic style of oil painting. Dorman's Star Wars: The Art of Dave Dorman cocktail table art book was the top-selling art book in 1996 for Ballantine Books and became the textbook of choice for illustration courses at Northern Illinois University in DeKalb, Illinois. He was also voted "The #1 Star Wars Artist of All Time" by Star Wars Galaxy Magazine in 1996. Star Wars creator George Lucas is a fan of Dorman's work and has purchased dozens of Dorman's original oil paintings. Dorman held a license with Lucasfilm for many years to do limited edition prints.

Dorman's own proprietary work, Wasted Lands, written by science fiction author Del Stone Jr., is currently making the rounds in Hollywood for a film adaptation. This action/adventure film is heavily influenced by Dorman's appreciation of directors like Jean-Pierre Jeunet (Whom he met on the Alien: Resurrection film set), Akira Kurosawa and Leone, as well as writers Joe Lansdale, Stephen King and F. Paul Wilson. Dorman is in development with Hollywood actor Dan Roebuck (River's Edge, Lost, Desperate Housewives) for a fictional children's book authored by Roebuck. Dorman is also in development with Dave Elliott's Atomeka Press for a Wasted Lands publishing project.

Dorman has been featured in interviews for the Dennis Miller Radio Show, Mancow's Morning Madhouse, Sci Fi Channel, Turner Network Television's Southern Living Presents magazine program, and WEAR-TV in Pensacola, an ABC affiliate. Dorman is an avid supporter of Tom Roush's Pensacola Film Festival and the Baytowne Film Festival and he creates the artwork for their annual event posters.

Dorman can be found annually at his Comic-Con booth in San Diego with his contemporaries, Scott Hampton, Christopher Moeller, and John Van Fleet. In 2010, Dorman was a "special guest" at San Diego Comic-Con. Dorman exhibited for the first C2E2 in Chicago in April 2010. Dorman also regularly attends the Wizard World Chicago, HeroesCon, and Detroit's Motor City Comic Con, and is often the featured guest artist at numerous Magic: The Gathering tournaments. Dorman's own company, Rolling Thunder, publishes art books and limited edition litho prints.

In 2010, IDW Publishing, now partnered with Desperado Publishing, is putting out the new book "Rolling Thunder: The Art of Dave Dorman." A special edition issue will launch at San Diego Comic-Con, where Dorman is a "special guest." Dorman estimates this book shows about half of his artwork, many of it personal work and pieces never before seen by the general public. In the book, Dorman speaks candidly and personally for the first time about his mid-life crisis and how he survived it. In 2009, Dorman was a judge for the SPECTRUM Annual, the fantasy world's bible for illustrators. In 2009, Dorman also made history by creating entirely digital art, for his first time, during Reverie '09, sponsored by MassiveBlack.com and ConceptArt.org.

Also in 2010, Dorman launched the podcast "Wednesday is Comic Book Day" with his wife, Denise Dorman – a mash-up of comic book industry insider news, pop culture news and interviews. The podcast is a free download on iTunes and is available via Farpoint Media, the producers of the show.

== Awards ==
Dorman has been the guest of honor at San Diego Comic-Con three times. It was there that he earned the Eisner Award in 1993 for his art work on Alien: Tribes.

== Personal life ==
He has been a longtime resident of Shalimar, Florida and of Mill Creek, Illinois. He moved to Geneva, Illinois in 2005. In 2006, Dorman offered to create an original 3' x 6' oil painting worth US$50,000 for anyone that would buy his home in Shalimar Pointe, Florida. As of mid-2011, Dorman had attended Comic-Con twenty-seven years in a row.

== Selected works ==
- Covers of Heavy Metal magazines.
- Artwork in comics such as Batman, Spider-Man, Superman, G.I. Joe, Alien, Predator, Indiana Jones, King Kong and Alien vs. Predator (including toy design for Hasbro of the Alien action figures.)
- Harry Potter (Trading cards)
- Magic: The Gathering (Gaming Cards)
- Atomic Chili: The Illustrated Joe R. Lansdale
- Creating the first artwork of the Predalien.
