= Dead in the West =

Novel by Joe R. Lansdale

- Author: Joe R. Lansdale
- Cover artist: Colleen Doran
- Language: English
- Publisher: Night Shade Books
- Publication date: 1986 this version 2005
- Publication place: United States
- Media type: Print hardcover,
- Pages: 148
- ISBN: 1-597800-14-7
- Preceded by: Texas Night Riders (1983)
- Followed by: The Magic Wagon (1986)

Dead in the West is a short horror novel written by American author Joe R. Lansdale. It involves the tale of longtime Lansdale character the Reverend Jebediah Mercer: he rides into the town of Mud Creek, Texas that is about to be attacked by an Indian medicine man who was unjustly lynched by the town inhabitants. Soon the dead will rise and seek human flesh and the Reverend finds himself right in the middle of it. He aligns himself with the town doctor and two of the town's inhabitants, Abbey and David. Together they fight the zombie horde and try to dispatch the medicine man who is the cause of all the evil.

The novel was compiled with other short stories of the same character into Deadman's Road. An unabridged audiobook of this compilation was released in 2014 by Skyboat Media with the title changed to and performed by Stefan Rudnicki.
