= Hell's Bounty =

2016 novel by Joe R. Lansdale and John L. Lansdale

- Art by Tim Truman
- Author: Joe R. Lansdale and John L. Lansdale
- Cover artist: Timothy Truman
- Language: English
- Genre: Horror fiction
- Publisher: Subterranean Press
- Publication date: 2016
- Publication place: United States
- Media type: ebook, hardcover, limited edition
- Pages: 190
- ISBN: 978-1-596-06-745-5
- Preceded by: Fender Lizards (2015)

Hell's Bounty is a horror novel written by American brothers Joe R. Lansdale and John L. Lansdale. It takes place in the old western town of Falling Rock. Bounty hunter Smith (no first name given) sets off a chain of events as he searches for one bad hombre Quill. He is blown to hell, literally, where he makes a deal with a bartender Snappy, who is really Satan. He will save Smith from the bowels of hell if he returns to Falling Rock and stops Quill who has made a deal with the "Old Ones" who are so evil even Satan can't abide. Smith teams up with a whip snapping redhead whore named Payday, a legless man called Undertaker, and a whisky drinking doctor to stop Quill who has turned into a winged demon and has turned the people of the town into ghouls to try to stop Smith and his band from ruining his plans.

== Publisher's information ==
This book was published by Subterranean Press as an e-book and a limited edition. The limited edition has sold out.
