= The Bottoms (novel) =

2000 novel by Joe R. Lansdale

- Subterranean Press issue cover by Alan M. Clark
- Author: Joe R. Lansdale
- Cover artist: Alan M. Clark
- Language: English
- Publisher: Subterranean Press, Mysterious Press
- Publication date: 1 May 2000
- Publication place: United States
- Media type: Print (Hardcover)
- Pages: 332
- ISBN: 1-892284-60-X
- Preceded by: Blood Dance (2000)
- Followed by: A Fine Dark Line (2002)

The Bottoms is an Edgar Award-winning suspense novel by American author Joe R. Lansdale.

== Plot summary ==
This story takes place during the Great Depression in East Texas. Young Harry Crane discovers the mutilated body of a black woman that sets off a mystery involving rising violence and racism. Despite the efforts of law enforcement, the killing continues. Harry and his younger sister, Thomasina, fix their suspicions on a local horror legend, The Goat Man, who lives deep in the Big Thicket. Together they set out to solve the mystery of who the real killer is.

== Awards ==
- The 2001 Edgar Award for best novel.
- A New York Times Notable Book of the Year (2000)
- The 2000 Herodotus Award for The First US Historical Novel
- A 2000 Dashiell Hammett Award for "Best Novel" (nominated)
- The 2001 Mystery Readers International's Macavity Awards for best mystery novel. (nominated)

== Editions ==
Mysterious Press edition

This book was published as lettered edition and a limited edition by Subterranean Press and as a trade hardcover by Mysterious Press. It was re-issued as a trade paperback by Vintage Crime/Black Lizard Publications on 7 December 2010. As of August 2012, all hardcover editions are out of print.

== Film adaptation ==
As of 2014 the book was being co-produced for a film by Joe R. Lansdale, Bill Paxton, and Brad Wyman. Paxton died in 2017, making any further plans uncertain.
