= All the Earth, Thrown to the Sky =

2011 novel by Joe R. Lansdale

- Jacket designed by Kenny Holcomb
- Author: Joe R. Lansdale
- Language: English
- Genre: suspense mystery, young adult fiction
- Publisher: Delacorte Press
- Publication date: 2011
- Publication place: United States
- Media type: Print Hardcover, Trade paperback
- Pages: 227
- ISBN: 978-0-385-73931-3
- Preceded by: Under the Warrior Star (2010)
- Followed by: Edge of Dark Water (2012)

All the Earth, Thrown to the Sky is a young adult novel written by American author Joe R. Lansdale. The story takes place during the Dust Bowl in the mid-1930s.

== Plot summary ==
It is the height of the Great Depression in the Dust Bowl of Oklahoma. Both of Jack Catcher's parents are dead. His mom died from lung disease and his father killed himself. When his neighbor Jane and her little brother Tony show up with a plan to take a dead neighbor's car to Texas, Jack is more than willing to go. However their plans go awry when they have a run in with one of the era's most notorious gangsters. They learn the gang is on their way to kill a former member. After narrowly escaping with their lives, the kids set off to warn the man that his former gang members are on their way to kill him.

== Editions ==
This book was first issued as a hardcover by Delacorte Press and has been reissued as a trade paperback by Ember Press which is owned by Random House Publishing.
