= The Big Blow (Lansdale novel) =

Novel by Joe R. Lansdale

- Cover art by Gail Cross
- Author: Joe R. Lansdale
- Cover artist: Gail Cross
- Language: English
- Publisher: Subterranean Press
- Publication date: 2000
- Publication place: United States
- Media type: Print - Limited edition
- Pages: 153
- ISBN: 1-892284-97-9
- Preceded by: Something Lumber This Way Comes (1999)
- Followed by: Blood Dance (2000)

The Big Blow is a 2000 novel written by American author Joe R. Lansdale. It tells a fictional story of real life boxing great Jack Johnson.

== Plot summary ==
It's the year 1900 and a major Hurricane is brewing in the Gulf of Mexico. Future real life boxing champion Jack Johnson is training for an upcoming fight the promoters have no interest in him winning. The boxing fans in Galveston, Texas are incensed since an African American fighter (Johnson) has soundly defeated the local white champion. So they send north to import John McBride, a racist hired to do one thing: defeat Johnson and restore the championship to a white fighter. All the while the 1900 Galveston Hurricane is moving north towards the Texas coast.

The short story on which this novel is based – which was originally published in the 1997 anthology edited by Douglas E. Winter called Revelations – won a 1997 Bram Stoker Award.

== Film Adaptation ==
In 2018 a film based on this novel was in production. Giannina Scott and Ridley Scott were producing at Scott Free.
