= A Fine Dark Line =

2002 novel by Joe R. Lansdale

- First (limited) edition
- Author: Joe R. Lansdale
- Language: English
- Genre: Novel
- Publisher: Subterranean Press, Mysterious Press
- Publication date: 1 June 2002
- Publication place: United States
- Media type: Print (Hardcover)(Trade Paperback)
- Pages: 412
- ISBN: 1-931081-66-2
- OCLC: 51583529
- Preceded by: The Bottoms (2000)
- Followed by: Sunset and Sawdust (2004)

A Fine Dark Line is a 2002 novel by American writer Joe R. Lansdale. The story is set in Dumont, Texas, in 1958. This novel was issued as a limited edition by Subterranean Press and as a trade hardcover and a trade paperback by Mysterious Press. Both hardcover editions are now out of print. A trade paperback was published by Mysterious Press on October 1, 2003.

== Plot summary ==
The story is told through the eyes of Stanley Mitchell, a thirteen-year-old boy, the younger of two children. The Mitchells are the owners and proprietors of the only drive-in theater in Dumont. Stanley discovers a tin box containing a collection of troubled love letters that ultimately lead him to a burned-out house, the mysterious deaths of two young women and various secrets that the Dumont leaders would prefer remain buried. Stanley's ally is Buster Smith, the projectionist at the drive-in theater, an elderly black man whose attempts to drown his demons in alcohol are doomed to failure, but who has a depth that only Stanley is aware of. In attempting to solve the mysteries of the deaths of the two women, Stanley exposes himself, his family and his friends, to danger.
