= Hot in December =

2013 novel by Joe R. Lansdale

- Author: Joe R. Lansdale
- Illustrator: Erin Wells
- Cover artist: Keri Knutson
- Language: English
- Genre: Murder mystery
- Publisher: Dark Regions Press
- Publication date: December 2013, limited editions April 2014
- Publication place: United States
- Media type: Trade Paperback, ebook, limited edition, lettered edition
- Pages: 109
- ISBN: 978-1-62641-014-5
- Preceded by: The Thicket (2013)

Hot in December is a crime/suspense novella written by American author Joe R. Lansdale. It's the story of a man who witnesses a fatal hit and run incident of one of his good neighbors. Tom Chan, the protagonist, gets a good look at the driver who didn't even look back. The problem is when Tom identifies the driver he turns out to be the son of the leader of a powerful criminal gang, The Dixie Mafia. To keep Tom from testifying, his wife is abducted and his daughter threatened. So Tom enlists the help of some old war buddies he served with in Afghanistan to rescue his family and bring justice to the gang of criminals. Problem is, one of the friends is a homicidal maniac whose level of violence shocks even Tom.

== Editions ==
This book is available as a trade paperback, a limited edition hardcover (300 copies) and a lettered edition (32 copies) from Dark Regions Press Limited editions contain illustrations not included in the paperback.
