= Jonah Hex: Shadows West =

Collection of graphic novels by Joe R. Lansdale

- Cover art by Tim Truman and Sam Glanzman.
- Author: Joe R. Lansdale
- Illustrator: Tim Truman, Sam Glanzman
- Language: English
- Series: Jonah Hex
- Genre: Western, science fiction
- Publisher: Vertigo/DC Comics
- Publication date: 2014
- Publication place: United States
- Media type: Full sized trade paperback
- Pages: 389
- ISBN: 978-1-4012-4715-7

Jonah Hex: Shadows West is a collection of graphic novels written by American author Joe R. Lansdale. The artwork was done by writer and illustrator Timothy Truman and artist Sam Glanzman. These works were published from 1993 to 1999 by DC Comics. These all surround the adventures of fictional bounty hunter Jonah Hex who was originally created by writer John Albano and artist Tony DeZuniga in 1977. All of the original story and artwork has been redone and reprinted in high quality graphics by Vertigo/DC Comics in 2014.

== Contents ==
1994 introduction by Joe R. Lansdale

- Two Gun mojo
- Chapter One: Slow Go Smith
- Chapter Two: Invitation to a Hanging
- Chapter Three: The Resurrectionist
- Chapter Four: Vendetta Times Two
- Chapter Five: Showdown
- Riders of the Worm and Such
- Chapter One: No Rest for the Wicked and the Good don't need any
- Chapter Two: Wilde's West
- Chapter Three: Big Worm
- Chapter Four: Autumns of Our Discontent
- Chapter Five: Cataclysm in Worm Town
- Shadows West
- Part One: Long Tom
- Part two: Gathering Shadows
- Part Three: Final Shadows
