= Electric Gumbo: A Lansdale Reader =

1994 compilation of Joe R. Lansdale's short works

Electric Gumbo: A Lansdale Reader is a compilation of Joe R. Lansdale's short works. It has only been published once, exclusively by the Quality Paperback Book Club in trade paperback form in 1994.

It contains:

- Introduction
- The Drive-In (A Novel) [full reprinting] (nominated for Bram Stoker Award)
- By Bizarre Hands {originally published in Hardboiled #9 (1988)}
- Drive-In Date {originally published in Night Visions 8 (1991)}
- The Events Concerning a Nude Fold-Out Found in a Harlequin Romance (winner of Bram Stoker Award) {originally published in Dark at Heart, ed. Joe & Karen Lansdale (1992)}
- The Fat Man and the Elephant {originally published in By Bizarre Hands (1989)}
- A Hard-On for Horror: Low Budget Excitement (non-fiction) {extended from shorter version, probably published in 1985 in Twilight Zone Magazine, or at some point in 1992}
- Hell Through A Windshield (non-fiction) {extended from shorter version published in Twilight Zone Magazine, Mar/Apr 1985}
- The Job {originally published in Razored Saddles, ed. Joe R. Lansdale & Pat LoBrutto (1989)}
- Mister Weed-Eater {originally published by (James) Cahill Press (1993)}
- Night They Missed the Horror Show (winner of Bram Stoker Award) {originally published in Silver Scream, ed. David J. Schow (1988)}
- On the Far Side of the Cadillac Desert With Dead Folks (winner of Bram Stoker Award) {originally published in Book of the Dead, ed. John M. Skipp & Craig Spector (1989)}
- The Phone Woman {originally published in Night Visions 8 (1991)}
- The Pit {originally published in The Black Lizard Anthology of Crime Fiction, ed. Ed Gorman (1987)}
- The Steel Valentine {originally published in By Bizarre Hands (1989)}
- Steppin' Out, Summer, '68 {originally published in Night Visions 8 (1991)}
- Tight Little Stitches In A Dead Man's Back {originally published in Nukes, ed. John Maclay (1986)}
- Trains Not Taken {originally published in RE:AL, Spring 1987}
- Wild Bill's Body (excerpt from the novel The Magic Wagon)

This compilation contains nothing exclusive.
