= Deadman's Road =

2010 book by Joe R. Lansdale

- First edition
- Author: Joe R. Lansdale
- Illustrator: Glenn Chadbourne
- Cover artist: Timothy Truman
- Language: English
- Genre: Horror, short story collection
- Publisher: Subterranean Press
- Publication date: 2010
- Publication place: United States
- Media type: Print hardcover, limited edition
- Pages: 271
- ISBN: 978-1-59606-330-3
- Preceded by: The Best of Joe R. Lansdale (2010)
- Followed by: By Bizarre Hands Rides Again (2010)

Deadman's Road is a collection of one novel and four novellas by American writer Joe R. Lansdale. It featuring old west zombie slaying, monster fighting Reverend Jedidiah Mercer, including the re-release of the pulp novel Dead in the West, and four stories, one never before collected, one brand new.

== Editions ==
This book was issued as a trade hardcover and a deluxe slipcased limited edition by Subterranean Press. Both editions have sold out. Cover artwork is by Timothy Truman and the interior artwork is by Glenn Chadbourne It was reissued as a trade paperback by Tachyon Publications on August 1, 2013.

Cover of trade paperback

== Table of contents ==
- "Introduction: The Reverend Rides Again and Again and Again and Again"
- Dead in the West
- "Deadman's Road"
- "The Gentleman's Hotel"
- "The Crawling Sky"
- "The Dark Down There"
