= Santiago Caruso =

Argentine painter (born 1982)

- Born: 1982 (age 43–44)
- Education: Escuela de Bellas Artes Carlos Morel
- Movement: Symbolism
- Website: santiagocaruso.com.ar

Santiago Caruso (born 1982) is an Argentine symbolist painter.

== Career ==
Caruso is the author of Materia Oscura, an artbook containing a selection of his works over a 15-year period. He illustrated Neil Gaiman's Invocations and two modern editions of Alejandra Pizarnik's La Condesa Sangrienta (2010) and El eco de mis muertes (2012). He also illustrated a 2011 edition of Ambrose Bierce's The Monk and the Hangman's Daughter, as well as modern editions of H.P. Lovecraft's The Dunwich Horror and Robert William Chambers' The King in Yellow.
