= Bubba Ho-Tep (novella) =

1994 novella by Joe R. Lansdale

- Author: Joe R. Lansdale
- Cover artist: Aaron Lea
- Language: English
- Genre: Alternate history
- Publisher: Night Shade Books
- Publication date: August 1, 1994
- Publication place: United States
- Media type: Print (Hardcover, Trade paperback)
- Pages: 47
- ISBN: 1-892389-46-0
- Preceded by: Steppin' Out, Summer '68
- Followed by: Tight Little Stitches In A Dead Man's Back

Bubba Ho-Tep is a 1994 alternate history novella by American author Joe R. Lansdale. It was first published on August 1, 1994, in the Elvis Presley themed anthology The King is Dead and has since been re-published in various formats. A film adaptation of the same name was released in 2002 and starred Bruce Campbell as the lead character of Elvis.

== Synopsis ==
In this story, the real Elvis Presley switched places years ago with an Elvis impersonator. Tired of the life of drugs, women, and people who wanted nothing more than his money, he settles in to live a life of obscurity in an East Texas trailer park, where he becomes the best Elvis impersonator ever. Then his health begins to fail, and he falls from a stage and breaks his hip. His trailer burns down and with it all evidence that proves he was the real Elvis Presley. He ends up in a shabby retirement home, which is where the story starts.

Late at night, Elvis hears scuttling noises and other creepy sounds in the otherwise quiet Mud Creek Shady Grove Convalescence Home. He befriends a black man, who is convinced he is John F. Kennedy, and the two begin to piece together that an Egyptian mummy is stalking the halls and sucking up souls in the night. Together the two men confront the monster, as no one will believe them.

== Adaptations ==
=== Film adaptation ===
A film adaptation of Bubba Ho-Tep was released in 2002 and was directed by Don Coscarelli, who also wrote the film's screenplay. Bruce Campbell was brought in to portray the film's lead character of Elvis Presley and Ossie Davis as Kennedy. Due to a successful roadshow theatrical release held by Coscarelli, Bubba Ho-Tep quickly obtained cult movie status.

=== Dramatised audiobook ===
A full-cast audiobook of the novel was released by GraphicAudio on 1 August 2025.

== Sequels ==
Coscarelli never intended to create a sequel to Bubba Ho-Tep, and the end credits announced a second film entitled Bubba Nosferatu: Curse of the She-Vampires as a joke. He changed his mind after the positive reception of the first film and after several people inquired about the sequel. Lansdale developed ideas discussed for the follow-up into a novella, Bubba and the Cosmic Blood-suckers, published in 2017. This story took place earlier in Elvis's life, during a period in which he worked for Colonel Parker battling monsters prior to exchanging identities with Sebastian Haff.

In 2018, IDW Publishing released a five-issue limited series adaptation of the novella, retitled Bubba Ho-Tep and the Cosmic Blood-Suckers. The series was supervised by Lansdale, written by Joshua Jabcuga, and illustrated by Tadd Galusha. In 2019, Dynamite Entertainment published a four-issue crossover miniseries, Army of Darkness / Bubba Ho-Tep, a sequel to the original story which saw Elvis team up with Bruce Campbell's iconic character, Ash Williams.

== Reception ==
Kirkus Reviews heavily criticized Bubba Ho-Tep upon its initial release, as they considered the story to be one of the worst of the Elvis anthology as they thought that Lansdale "spends too much time on The King's hard-ons" and that "too much bad writing leaves the reader all shook up and itchin like a man on a fuzzy tree".
