= Black Hat Jack =

Novella written by Joe R. Lansdale

- Art by Ken Laager
- Author: Joe R. Lansdale
- Illustrator: Ken Laager
- Cover artist: Ken Laager
- Language: English
- Genre: Western fiction
- Publisher: Subterranean Press
- Publication date: 2014
- Publication place: United States
- Media type: ebook, hardcover, limited edition
- Pages: 130
- ISBN: 978-1-59606-677-9
- Preceded by: Prisoner 489(2014)
- Followed by: Paradise Sky(2015)

Black Hat Jack: The True Life Adventures of Deadwood Dick as told by His Ownself is a novella written by American author Joe R. Lansdale. It tells the story about African-American cowboy Nat Love, also known as "Deadwood Dick" and his friend Black Hat Jack. The story is told from Nat's narrative point of view and takes place in the old west in 1874 during the Second Battle of Adobe Walls fought against various tribes of Native Americans.

== Release information ==
It was published by Subterranean Press as an eBook and both a deluxe hardcover and limited edition. The hardcover has sold out.
