= Retro-Pulp Tales =

2006 anthology edited by Joe R. Lansdale

RetrobyPulp Tales is a limited edition anthology published by Subterranean Press in 2006, edited by Joe R. Lansdale. It tied in winning the 2006 Bram Stoker Award for Best Anthology (the other winning title was "Mondo Zombie" edited by John Skipp).

It contains new stories written in the style of the pulp magazines of the early 20th century. Lansdale's guidelines for Retro Pulp Tales were basic: "Write a story in the vein of the old pulps ... that takes place before 1960, and with the restrictions of those times."

It includes contributions by Bill Crider, Stephen Gallagher, Melissa Mia Hall, Alex Irvine, Tim Lebbon, Kim Newman, Norman Partridge, Gary Phillips, James Reasoner, Al Sarrantonio, Chet Williamson, and F. Paul Wilson. This collection was issued as a trade hardcover, a numbered limited edition, and a lettered special edition. All issues have long since sold out.

== Table of Contents ==
- Devil Wings Over France: A DeadbyStick Malloy Story by James Reasoner
- From the Back Pages by Chet Williamson
- The Body Lies by Tim Lebbon
- New Game in Town by Alex Irvine
- Incident on Hill 19 by Gary Phillips
- Zekiel Saw the Wheel by Bill Crider
- The Box by Stephen Gallagher
- Sex Slaves of the Dragon Tong by F. Paul Wilson
- Clubland Heroes by Kim Newman
- Summer by Al Sarrantonio
- Alien Love at Zero Break by Melissa Mia Hall
- Carrion by Norman Partridge
