= Miracles Ain't What They Used To Be =

2016 collection of memoirs and essays by Joe R. Lansdale

Miracles Ain't What They Use To Be
- Authors: Joe R. Lansdale
- Language: English
- Genre: Essays and memoir collections
- Publisher: PM Press
- Publication date: 2016
- Publication place: United States
- Media type: Lettered, signed, and paperback editions
- Pages: 110
- ISBN: 978-1-62963-1-523
- Preceded by: Dead on The Bones: Pulp on Fire (2016)

Miracles Ain't What They Used To Be Plus... is a 2016 collection of memoirs and essays by American author Joe R. Lansdale. It includes Lansdale's essays on how he came to be an author, and on his inspirations, personal beliefs, ideas for the vast amount of published work he has done over his 40 years of writing novels, short stories, novellas, and comic books.

== Table of contents ==
1. The Parable of the Stick -A Hap and Leonard short story
2. Apollo Red
3. Short Night -A Hap and Leonard short story
4. Miracles Ain't What They Used to Be
5. That's How you Clean a Squirrel
6. Outspoken Interview with Joe R. Lansdale
7. Dark Inspiration
8. The Drowned Man
9. Darkness in the East
10. Doggone Justice
11. The Day Before the Day After
12. Bibliography

=== Publication ===
This book is part of the PM Press Outspoken Author series.
