= The Thicket (novel) =

2013 novel by Joe R. Lansdale

- Mulholland Books Hardcover
- Author: Joe R. Lansdale
- Language: English
- Genre: Murder mystery
- Publisher: Mulholland Books
- Publication date: September 10, 2013
- Publication place: United States
- Media type: Print (Hardcover)
- Pages: 340
- ISBN: 978-0-316-18845-6
- Preceded by: In Waders From Mars (Children’s Book)(2012)

The Thicket is a mystery/suspense novel written by American author Joe R. Lansdale. It was released by Mulholland Books on September 10, 2013. The title refers to Big Thicket, a heavily forested area in Southeast Texas. This book was selected by the Library Journal as one of the best historical fiction books of 2013. The trade paperback was issued on 10/14/14 by Mulholland Books.

== Premise ==
Jack Parker thought that he had already seen his fair share of tragedy. His grandmother was killed in a farm accident when he was barely five years old. His parents have just succumbed to the smallpox epidemic sweeping turn-of-the-century East Texas—orphaning him and his younger sister, Lula.

Then a travelling group of bank robbers murder Jack's grandfather and kidnap his sister. So Jack enlists the only people he can: a bounty hunting dwarf named Shorty, a grave-digging son of an ex-slave named Eustace, and a street-smart woman-for-hire named Jimmie Sue who has come into some very intimate knowledge about the bandits. Together the rag-tag group trail the group of criminals into the Big Thicket where they hope to rescue Lula and collect the bounty on the heads of the bandits. Soon they discover that these are not your run of the mill bank robbers. They are vicious and sadistic killers and the prospect of rescuing Lula unharmed looks bleak.

== Film adaptation ==
In 2014, it was announced that Gianni Nunnari was set to produce a film adaptation of The Thicket with Peter Dinklage set to star as Shorty.

In April 2019, Elliott Lester signed on to direct the film with Chris Kelley writing the screenplay.

In February 2020, Sophia Lillis, Noomi Rapace & Charlie Plummer joined the cast.

In March 2023, Juliette Lewis, Esmé Creed-Miles, Levon Hawke, Leslie Grace, Gbenga Akinnagbe, Macon Blair, James Hetfield, Ned Dennehy, Andrew Schulz, and Arliss Howard joined the cast with Lewis, Hawke, and Creed-Miles replacing Rapace, Plummer, and Lillis, respectively.
