= By Bizarre Hands =

1989 collection of short stories by Joe R. Lansdale

By Bizarre Hands is the first collection of short stories by American writer Joe R. Lansdale, published in 1989. The collection was nominated for a Bram Stoker Award for best fiction collection, and contains two stories which won Stokers. It has an introduction by Lewis Shiner. This book was re-issued as By Bizarre Hands Rides Again in 2010. The re-issue contains a new introduction by Joe R. Lansdale and new artwork by Alex McVey. This book is limited to 300 copies and is signed by both writer and artist. It also contains two stories not in the original issue.

First edition (publ. Mark V. Ziesing), cover artist by J. K. Potter

== List of short stories ==
- "Boys Will Be Boys" (1985, originally published in Hardboiled #3) (excerpt of novel The Nightrunners)
- "By Bizarre Hands" (1988, originally published in Hardboiled #9)
- "Down By the Sea Near the Great Big Rock" (1984, originally published in Masques #1)
- "Duck Hunt" (1986, originally published in After Midnight)
- "The Fat Man and the Elephant" (previously unpublished)
- "Fish Night" (1982, originally published in Specter!)
- "Hell Through A Windshield" (1985, extended from shorter version published in Twilight Zone Magazine - non-fiction)
- "I Tell You It's Love" (1983, originally published in Modern Stories, 1983)
- "Letter From the South, Two Moons West of Nacogdoches" (1986, originally published in Last Wave #5 (1986))
- "Night They Missed the Horror Show" (1988, originally published in Silver Scream - Bram Stoker Award winner)
- "On the Far Side of the Cadillac Desert With Dead Folks" (1989, originally published in Book of the Dead - Bram Stoker Award winner)
- "The Pit" (1987, originally published in The Black Lizard Anthology of Crime Fiction, ed. Ed Gorman (1987)}
- "The Steel Valentine" (previously unpublished)
- "Tight Little Stitches in a Dead Man's Back" (1986, originally published in Nukes)
- "Trains Not Taken" (1987, originally published in RE:AL)
- "The Windstorm Passes" (1986, originally published in Pulpsmith, excerpt of novel The Magic Wagon)

This collection contains nothing truly exclusive; although no other collection has included "Boys Will Be Boys" or "The Windstorm Passes", both are actually excerpts from novels which were sold as short stories when no company would buy the novels. The novels have been published, though they are both currently out of print.

== Comics ==
Cover of the first Dark Horse issue.

By Bizarre Hands was also the name of two different comic book limited series, a 3-issue published by Dark Horse Comics and a 6-issue published by Avatar Press in 2004, where other authors and artists adapted some of Lansdale's stories to comic book form.

The Dark Horse series was collected as part of Atomic Chili: The Illustrated Joe R. Lansdale.

The stories in the Dark Horse series are, by issue:

1. "Tight Little Stitches in a Dead Man's Back" (adapted by Neal Barrett Jr. - art by Phil Hester)
2. "By Bizarre Hands" (adapted by Jerry Prosser - art by Dean Rohrer)
3. "Night They Missed the Picture Show" (adapted by Jerry Prosser - art by Dean Rohrer)

The stories in the Avatar series are, by issue:

1. "By Bizarre Hands" (adapted by Dheeraj Verma)
2. "Not From Detroit" (adapted by Armando Rossi)
3. "The Pit" (adapted by Andres Guinaldo)
4. "Tight Little Stitches In A Dead Man's Back" (adapted by Dheeraj Verma)
5. "Night They Missed the Picture Show" (adapted by Andres Guinaldo)
6. "God of the Razor" and "My Dead Dog Bobby" (adapted by Dheeraj Verma)
