= Leather Maiden =

2008 novel by Joe R. Lansdale

- Jacket designed by Peter Mendelsund
- Author: Joe R. Lansdale
- Language: English
- Publisher: Knopf
- Publication date: 2008
- Publication place: United States
- Media type: Print (Hardcover)(Trade Paperback)
- Pages: 287
- ISBN: 978-0-375-41452-7
- Preceded by: Lost Echos (2008)
- Followed by: Under the Warrior Star (2010)

Leather Maiden is a crime/mystery novel written by American author Joe R. Lansdale.

== Plot summary ==
Disturbed Iraq War Veteran Cason Statler returns to his hometown of Camp Rapture, Texas after being run out of Houston because of a scandalous affair. Now he's drinking too much and stalking his old girlfriend. With nothing else better to do he takes a job as a reporter for the small town newspaper. While working there he discovers his predecessor's notes on a cold case murder file. He figures that working this case will keep him out of trouble, but just the opposite is true. The closer he gets to the truth, the further his life spins out of control especially when he learns his upstanding citizen brother may be involved. To make matters worse, his Army buddy Booger shows up to lend a hand.

== Editions ==
The original hardcover was issued by Alfred A. Knopf publications and was recently reissued as a trade paperback by Vintage Crime/Black Lizard publications.

Vintage/Black Lizard Cover
