= Mulholland Books =

Publishing imprint of Little, Brown and Company

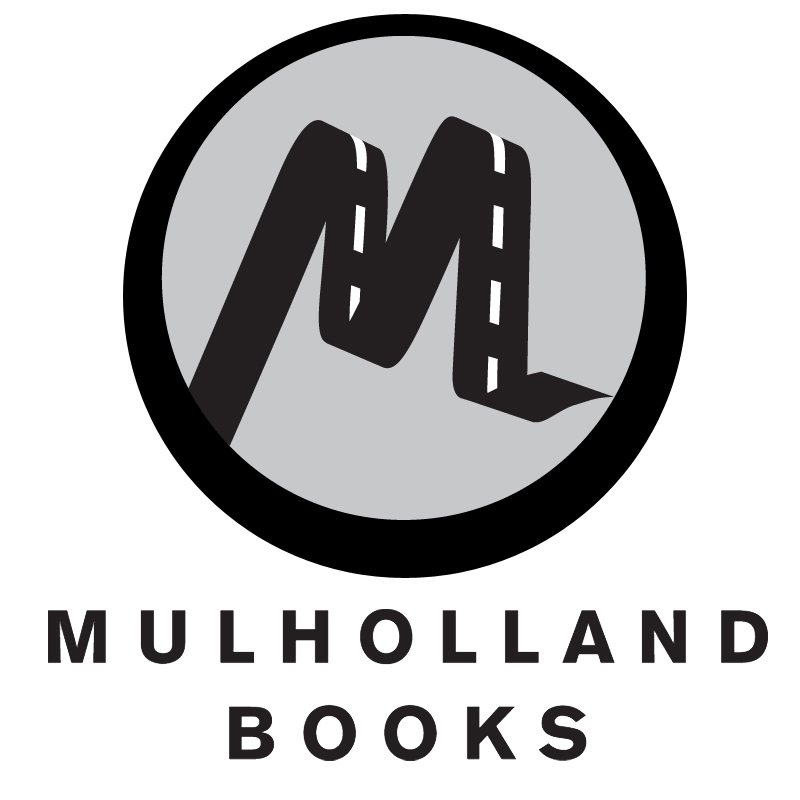
Mulholland Books Logo

Mulholland Books (US) is an imprint of Little, Brown and Company, a division of the Hachette Book Group. It specializes in publishing mysteries, thrillers, and suspense novels.

== History ==
Little, Brown and Company announced the creation of Mulholland Books on June 15, 2010. Mulholland Books is named after Mulholland Drive, a winding stretch of road that follows the ridge line of the Hollywood Hills. The imprint launched in Spring 2011 with the publication of a book by Marcia Clark.

For a time writer and producer Derek Haas curated a series of short stories on the Mulholland Books website under the title "Popcorn Fiction".

== Notable publications ==
- Guilt by Association by Marcia Clark (2011)
- The House of Silk by Anthony Horowitz (2011)
- Say You're Sorry by Michael Robotham (2012)
- The Cuckoo's Calling by Robert Galbraith (2013)
- Murder as a Fine Art by David Morrell (2013)
- The Thicket by Joe Lansdale (2013)
- The Shining Girls by Lauren Beukes (2013)
- S. by J.J. Abrams and Doug Dorst (2013)
- Whiskey Tango Foxtrot by David Shafer (2014)
- Canary by Duane Swierczynski (2015)
- Paradise Sky By Joe R. Lansdale (2015)
- Crooked by Austin Grossman (2015)
