= Mark Nelson (artist, born 1953) =

American artist (born 1953)

- Born: 1953 (age 72–73)
- Areas: Penciller, Artist, Inker

Mark A. Nelson (born 1953) is an artist whose work has appeared in role-playing games and comic books. Nelson's style has been described as "carefully articulated".

Nelson is an accomplished artist and educator, having taught at Northern Illinois University for two decades and worked at Raven Software and Madison Area Technical College. He later served as art director/head concept artist at Pi Studios and now runs Grazing Dinosaur Press with his wife. Nelson has illustrated numerous Dungeons & Dragons books, other games, and comic books for various publishers since the 1980s. Additionally, he has contributed to Eureka Productions' Graphic Classics series and authored an instructional book, Fantasy World-Building: A Guide to Developing Mythic Worlds and Legendary Creatures, published in 2019.

== Biography ==
Nelson attended the Cleveland Institute of Art and received his M.A. from the University of Michigan. He taught at Northern Illinois University for twenty years. One of his students was Tom Baxa.

From the late 1990s to the mid-2000s, Nelson worked for Raven Software doing conceptual work, painting digital skins, and creating textures for computer games. During this period, he was an animation instructor at Madison Area Technical College. Nelson was art director/head concept artist at Pi Studios in Houston from 2008 to 2011. He now runs his own studio (along with his wife, Anita), Grazing Dinosaur Press.

== Work ==
=== Illustrator ===
Nelson has produced interior illustrations for many Dungeons & Dragons books and Dragon magazine since 1985. He has also produced artwork for other games including Villains and Vigilantes (Fantasy Games Unlimited), Earthdawn and Shadowrun (FASA), and Orpheus (White Wolf), and illustrated cards for the Magic: The Gathering collectible card game.

=== Comics ===
Nelson has worked extensively in the comics industry since the mid-1980s, for publishers such as NOW Comics, First Comics, Eclipse Comics, Dark Horse Comics, Marvel Comics, DC Comics, and Kitchen Sink Press. His comic book work includes the series Aliens. He contributed to the magazine Hero Illustrated.

Nelson illustrated the cover of Joe R. Lansdale's novel Blood Dance.

Nelson has made numerous contributions to Eureka Productions' Graphic Classics series, including H.P. Lovecraft, Jack London, Ambrose Bierce, Bram Stoker, Horror Classics, O. Henry, Adventure Classics, Fantasy Classics, and Native American Classics. He has also illustrated stories in Eureka's Rosebud #18 and The Best of Rosebud.

=== Instructional books ===
Nelson authored Fantasy World-Building: A Guide to Developing Mythic Worlds and Legendary Creatures published through Dover Publications in 2019.
