= Incident On and Off a Mountain Road =

- Masters of Horror episode
- DVD cover for Incident On and Off a Mountain Road
- Episode no.: Season 1 Episode 1
- Directed by: Don Coscarelli
- Written by: Don Coscarelli; Joe R. Lansdale; Stephen Romano
- Production code: 101
- Original air date: October 28, 2005

Guest appearances
- John DeSantis; Ethan Embry; Heather Feeney; Angus Scrimm; Bree Turner

Episode chronology
← Previous —	Next → "H. P. Lovecraft's Dreams in the Witch-House"

"Incident On and Off a Mountain Road" is the premiere episode of the first season of Masters of Horror, written and directed by Don Coscarelli. It originally aired in North America on October 28, 2005. The screenplay is based on a 1981 short story of the same name by American author Joe R. Lansdale. Coscarelli adapted Lansdale's story to television, expanding the flashback structure to develop the protagonist's backstory. The episode was later published as a 4-issue comic book series, Masters of Horror #1–2.

== Plot ==
While driving on a secluded mountain road, Ellen (Bree Turner) loses control of her vehicle and collides with an abandoned car on the side of the road. When checking to see if the other driver is okay, she finds a trail of blood leading into the forest. Following it, she encounters a deformed serial killer known as Moon face (John DeSantis), dragging the driver of the other vehicle. After narrowly escaping him, Ellen flees into the forest, with Moon face following her trail.

Through flashbacks spread throughout the episode, she is shown receiving training from her survivalist husband Bruce (Ethan Embry), who taught her both weapons use and guerrilla tactics. She attempts to use these skills several times but despite her best efforts is still captured by the killer and taken to his workshop deep in the forest on a ridge overlooking a large waterfall.

After awakening in the basement—filled with the corpses of Moonface's previous victims—she encounters the delusional Buddy (Angus Scrimm), apparently insane but seemingly unharmed by Moonface. He speaks cryptically of the killer's methods and intent. Shortly thereafter, the killer comes downstairs, turning on a generator. Police sirens begin sounding as various lights around the room begin flashing. Lifting the other woman onto a large table, he uses a drill press to remove both of her eyes.

After Moonface leaves, Buddy talks Ellen into picking the lock on the chains binding her with a metal nail file that had been jabbed into her shoulder. Buddy, who had seemed to be tied up, suddenly stands up and begins shouting that Ellen is free. Moonface returns, and Ellen attacks Moonface and Buddy with a piece of wood. She runs upstairs where she is again attacked, but this time manages to overpower Moonface and knock him out of a window. Looking out, she sees him dangling by a blanket several meters below, hanging above the waterfall. She watches as the fabric rips, turning away as he finally falls. Finding a gun, a belt and boots, she leaves.

Returning to her car, she opens her trunk to reveal the body of her dead husband. In another flashback it is revealed that her husband had raped her during a brutal fight, shortly after which she strangled him with his own belt. Taking his body to Moonface's workshop, she removes his eyes and strings him up in the front yard in the same manner as Moonface's other victims. Before leaving she shoots Buddy, mimicking Moonface's "shh" gesture before killing him.

== Cast ==
- Bree Turner as Ellen
- Angus Scrimm as Buddy
- John DeSantis as Moonface
- Ethan Embry as Bruce
- Heather Feeney as Young Woman

== Release ==
=== Home media ===
The DVD was released by Anchor Bay Entertainment on May 9, 2006. Although the episode was the first to be episode broadcast, it was the third episode to be released on DVD. It includes a commentary with writer/director Don Coscarelli and writer Stephen Romano, as well as a several featurettes. It also includes the first installment in a series of short documentaries focusing on the director of the featured episode. The episode was later included on the third volume of the Blu-ray compilation of the series.

== Reception ==
Jon Condit from Dread Central rated the episode three and a half out of five, calling it "a generous and excellent start to an ambitious series." HorrorFreakNews rated it four out of five stars, praising the episode's pacing, cinematography, direction, and Turner's performance.
