= On the Far Side of the Cadillac Desert with Dead Folks =

1989 zombie apocalypse novella by Joe R. Lansdale

Cover of the chapbook edition of the novella.

Graphic novel artwork by Tim Truman.

"On the Far Side of the Cadillac Desert with Dead Folks" is a 1989 zombie apocalypse novella written by American author Joe R. Lansdale. It was also adapted to a comic book series (3 issues) and a graphic novel On the Far Side With Dead Folks by Avatar Press with artwork by Timothy Truman. The novella won the 1989 Bram Stoker Award in the Long Fiction category and won the British Fantasy Award for best short story.

== Plot summary ==
A mysterious bacteria has escaped a lab and is causing all the "dead folks" to re-animate. Bounty hunter Wayne (no last name given) is hunting his quarry Calhoun in a "Dead Dancing" bar where patrons pay to dance with female zombies and sometimes other things... After a violent struggle, Wayne manages to handcuff Calhoun who's wanted for raping and murdering a young girl. In order to collect his bounty, Wayne has to cross the Cadillac Desert to a place called Lawtown where criminals are executed by being pulled apart by tractors. Calhoun advises Wayne to sleep with one eye open as Calhoun has managed to kill every other bounty hunter that has pursued him. Wayne's dream is to collect enough money to buy a wrecking yard and retire from bounty hunting as he knew his luck would sooner or later run out. And besides Wayne is weary from the whole lifestyle and people like Calhoun.

The Cadillac Desert stretches for miles with old Cadillacs buried halfway in the ground at a slant. They were the result of the Chevy/Cadillac wars that took place years ago with the Chevy's being victorious. As Wayne and Calhoun descend deeper into the Cadillac Desert, a sandstorm suddenly starts and visibility is reduced to almost zero. Suddenly a large object looms in front of them and they crash into it taking out Wayne's Chevy. Suddenly the rotted faces of the dead folks appear and Wayne and Calhoun figure it's the end. However instead of being eaten they are led to the object that Wayne recognizes as a school bus. On board they are confronted by a nun dressed in very provocative clothing armed with a shotgun. They are introduced to Brother Lazarus who is driving the bus. Wayne observes the bus is equipped with radar and collided with them on purpose. Soon they arrive at a converted theme park that used to be Disneyland. Wayne observes that the dead folks have strange-looking ears (Mickey Mouse) and a bolt sticking out of their heads. This bolt is how they are controlled by Brother Lazarus.

Soon Wayne is befriended by a nun named Sister Worth who wants to leave "Jesusland" and tells Wayne of Brother Lazarus's plans for the two men which aren't very nice. So Wayne and Calhoun agree to a pact: Along with Sister Worth, they help each other escape and then settle their differences.
