= Subterranean Press =

American specialty small press

- Founded: 1995
- Founder: William Schafer and Tim Holt
- Country of origin: United States
- Headquarters location: Burton, Michigan
- Publication types: Books
- Fiction genres: Horror, suspense, dark mystery, fantasy, science fiction
- Official website: subterraneanpress.com

Subterranean Press is a small press publisher in Burton, Michigan. Subterranean is best known for publishing genre fiction, primarily horror, suspense and dark mystery, fantasy, and science fiction. In addition to publishing novels, short story collections and chapbooks, Subterranean also produced a quarterly publication called Subterranean Magazine from 2005 to 2014, specialising in short fiction and edited by William Schafer; it had also an online direct seller. In addition to trade editions, the company produces collector's and limited editions. These books are issued with author signatures, in both numbered and lettered states, and are produced using high-grade book papers and bindings with matching slipcases and traycases.

Subterranean Press won the 2025 Locus Award for Best Publisher.

== History ==
Subterranean Press was founded in 1995. To date, the company has released more than 200 books and is currently averaging between 30 and 50 new titles every year. Subterranean Press released their first imprint, Far Territories, in early 2008. William K. Schafer is the head editor at Subterranean Press.

== Authors ==
Subterranean Press has published exclusive editions of works by Dan Simmons, China Miéville, Kelley Armstrong, Caitlín R. Kiernan, Robert Silverberg, Joe Hill, and Joe R. Lansdale, among others.

== Books published ==
This is a list of books which represent that work's first publication in book form. This list does not include limited edition reprints, unless those editions are considered definitive author revisions of the original.

- The Boar, Joe R. Lansdale (1998)
- Kafka Americana, Jonathan Lethem, Carter Scholz (1999)
- First Meetings, Orson Scott Card (2002)
- From Weird and Distant Shores (2002)
- The Devil You Know, Poppy Z. Brite (2003)
- Dreamsongs: A RRetrospective, George R.R. Martin (2003)
- The Dry Salvages, Caitlín R. Kiernan (2004)
- Inside Job, Connie Willis (2005)
- Alabaster, Caitlín R. Kiernan (2006)
- Getting to Know You, David Marusek (2007)
- Rite: Short Work, Tad Williams (2007)
- The Shadows, Kith and Kin, Joe R. Lansdale (2007)
- Songs of a Dead Dreamer, Thomas Ligotti (revised, definitive edition, 2010)
- Multiverse: Exploring Poul Anderson's Worlds, Greg Bear, Gardner Dozois (eds.) (2014)
- The Dead Man and Other Horror Stories, Gene Wolfe (2023)
