= Joe R. Lansdale =

American novelist, martial arts instructor

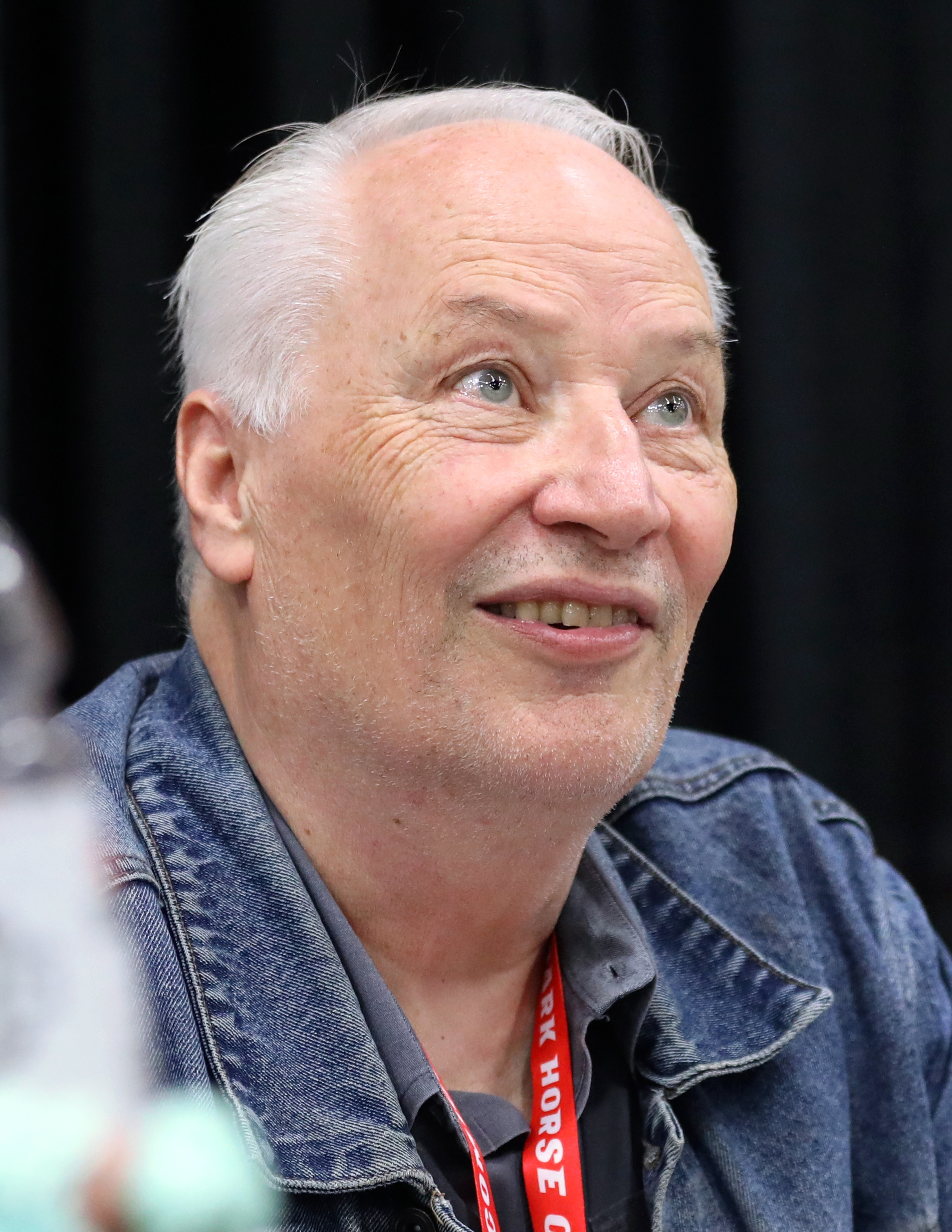
- Lansdale in 2024
- Born: Joe Richard Lansdale; October 28, 1951 (age 75); Gladewater, Texas, U.S.
- Occupations: Writer; author; martial arts instructor
- Spouse: Karen Lansdale
- Children: Kasey Lansdale and Keith Lansdale
- Writing career
- Pen name: Ray Slater, Brad Simmons, Jack Buchanan
- Genres: Horror, mystery, western, adventure, crime
- Notable works: Bubba Ho-Tep; Hap and Leonard
- Movement: Splatterpunk
- Website: joerlansdale.com

Joe Richard Lansdale (born October 28, 1951) is an American writer and martial arts instructor. A prose writer in a variety of genres, including Western, horror, science fiction, mystery, and suspense, he has also written comic books and screenplays. Several of his novels have been adapted for film and television. He is the winner of the British Fantasy Award, the American Horror Award, the Edgar Award, and eleven Bram Stoker Awards.

== Early life ==
Lansdale grew up in East Texas, the son of a mechanic.

== Career ==
Lansdale's writing is characterized by a deep sense of irony, and features strange or absurd situations or characters, such as Elvis Presley and John F. Kennedy battling a soul-sucking Egyptian mummy in a nursing home (the plot of his Bram Stoker Award-nominated novella, Bubba Ho-Tep, which was made into a movie by Don Coscarelli).

His Hap and Leonard series of sixteen novels, six novellas, and seven short story collections feature Hap Collins and Leonard Pine who live in the fictional town of Laborde, in East Texas, where they find themselves solving a variety of crimes. Hap is a white working class laborer in his mid forties who once protested against the war in Vietnam and spent time in federal prison rather than be drafted, and Leonard is a gay black Vietnam vet. Both of them are accomplished fighters. The stories (told from Hap's point of view) are violent, and characterized by strong language and sexual situations. Lansdale depiction of East Texas is essentially "good" but blighted by racism, ignorance, urban and rural deprivation and corrupt public officials. His novels are also characterized by sharp humor and "wisecracking" dialogue. These books were adapted into a TV series for the SundanceTV channel and a series of graphic novels in 2017. Season 2 is based on the second Hap and Leonard novel Mucho Mojo and season 3, which premiered on March 7, 2018, is based on the third novel The Two-Bear Mambo. Much of Lansdale's work has been issued and re-issued as limited editions by Subterranean Press and as trade paperbacks by Vintage Crime/Black Lizard Publications.

Lansdale's novel titled Fender Lizards was published in November 2015 by Subterranean Press. In February 2016, two full-length novels Hell's Bounty was published February 27, 2015, also by Subterranean Press; further, a new Hap and Leonard novel titled Honky Tonk Samurai was released February 2, 2015 by Mulholland Books. On January 31, 2017, Coco Butternut: A Hap and Leonard Novella was released by Subterranean Press and Rusty Puppy was released by Mulholland Books February 21, 2017. A new mosaic novel titled Blood and Lemonade was released on March 14, 2017.

Lansdale and daughter Kasey started a new publishing company called Pandi Press to control the re-issue and publication of his older works.

Lansdale book of essays and memoirs, Miracles Ain't What They Used To Be, was released by PM Press's Outspoken Author Series. His newest Hap and Leonard release is a novel titled Jackrabbit Smile and released March 27, 2018. He also, along with his daughter Kasey, released a collection of Dana Roberts mysteries titled Terror is Our Business: Dana Roberts' Casebook of Horrors, published in May 2018 by Cutting Block Books. In October 2018 a short story collection titled Driving to Geronimo's Grave and Other Stories has been published by Subterranean Press as a limited edition. His most recent novel is titled More Better Deals and was published by Mulholland Books. Its hardcover and Kindle releases were on July 21, 2020. Since then he released a novel Big Lizard co-written with his son Keith Lansdale released as a limited edition of 1,500 hard-copies published by Short, Scary Tales Publications and is also available through Amazon Kindle. His novel is titled Moon Lake and was released by Mulholland Books on June 22, 2021. He released a book of poetry titled Apache Witch as a limited edition that sold out right away and a Nat Love novella, Radiant Apples, published by Subterranean Press.

== Personal life ==
Lansdale, who was born in Gladewater, Texas, lives in Nacogdoches, Texas, with his wife, Karen. He is the writer in residence at Stephen F. Austin State University. He also teaches at his own Shen Chuan martial arts school Lansdale's Self Defense Systems in Nacogdoches and is a member of the United States Martial Arts Hall of Fame as Sōke and the International Martial Arts Hall of Fame. He is the father of actress, musician and publisher Kasey Lansdale and reporter and screenwriter Keith Lansdale. He has described himself as an atheist, though he has also said that he is not anti-religion.

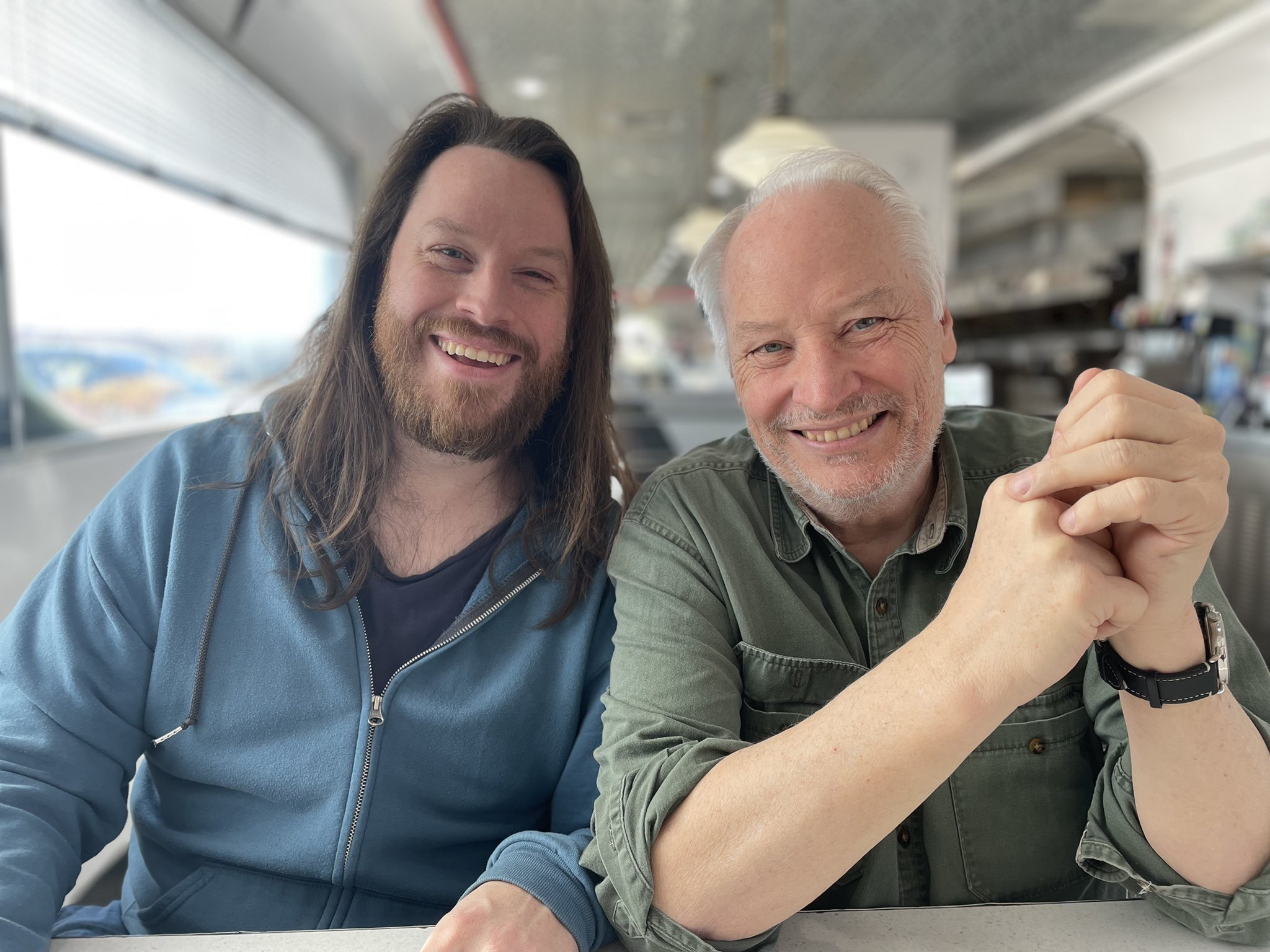
Keith and Joe Lansdale

== Film and television ==
Lansdale was a contributing writer for Batman: The Animated Series, credited with three episodes, namely "Perchance to Dream" (season 1, episode 26, which aired October 29, 1992), "Read My Lips" (season 1, episode #59 that aired May 10, 1993), and "Showdown" (season 4, episode 2, aired September 12, 1995). Lansdale also wrote "Identity Crisis" on Superman: The Animated Series (season 2, episode 6, airing September 15, 1997), and "Critters" (with Steve Gerber) for The New Batman Adventures (season 2, episode 2, airing September 19, 1998).

Lansdale's first film adaptation was Bubba Ho-Tep, based on his novella of the same and released in 2002. The film featured Elvis Presley and a man who believes himself to be John F. Kennedy, confined to an old-age rest home, teaming up to fight a mummy who is stealing their friends' souls.

In 2010, Lansdale wrote the screenplay for the animated short DC Showcase: Jonah Hex. The short story Incident On and Off a Mountain Road was adapted for the first episode of the first season of Masters of Horror. It aired on October 28, 2005. Lansdale's story "The Job" was made into an 11-minute short in 1997 by A.W. Feidler. It is available on the out-of-print DVD collection, Short 5 – Diversity, on Warner Home Video. The short story "Drive-In Date" was filmed as a short by James Cahill, from a script written by Lansdale, published in A Fist Full of Stories.

The film Christmas with the Dead, based on the Lansdale short story of the same name, was filmed in East Texas in Summer 2011. The film starring Brad Maule, Damian Maffei, and Kasey Lansdale is currently showing on the film festival circuit and at private screenings. The DVD has been released. Actor and director Bill Paxton worked for six years on a film adaptation of Lansdale's novel The Bottoms. In a 2015 interview with Entertainment Weekly, Paxton admitted having difficulty getting the project off the ground. Paxton's death left unfinished projects, including The Bottoms movie.

Backup Media and Memento Films International financed Cold in July, an adaptation of Lansdale's cult novel was directed by Jim Mickle, with acting by Michael C. Hall and Sam Shepard. Filming began in 2013. Accompanied by a movie tie-in edition of the original story released by Tachyon Publications, the film was screened at the 2014 Sundance Film Festival.

Nick Damici and Jim Mickle developed a Hap and Leonard private investigator series for the Sundance Channel, which premiered in March 2016. On June 27, 2016, SundanceTV renewed the series for a six-episode second season, which aired in 2017 and was based on the second novel, Mucho Mojo. Season 3 is based the third book, The Two-Bear Mambo On May 14, 2018, SundanceTV announced the cancellation of the series.

Lansdale is the executive producer of the film The Pale Door.

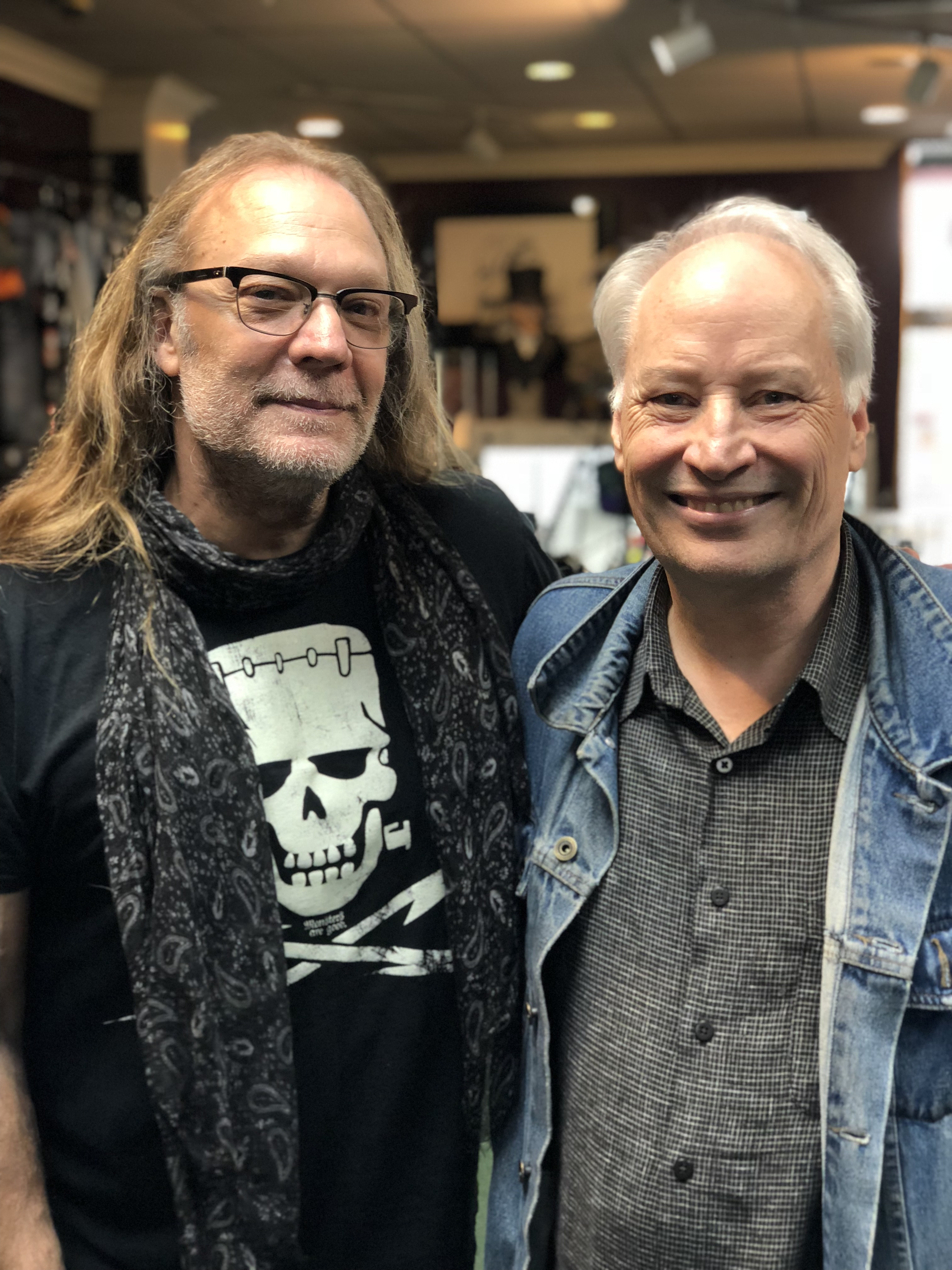
The Walking Dead Executive Producer Greg Nicotero with Lansdale

== Awards ==
Among his awards, Joe Lansdale has won nine Bram Stoker Awards and nominated for the World Fantasy Award eleven times over the course of his long career.

| Work | Year & Award | Category | Result | Ref. |
|---|---|---|---|---|
| Tight Little Stitches in a Dead Man's Back | 1987 World Fantasy Award | Short Fiction | Nominated | |
| Night They Missed the Horror Show | 1988 Bram Stoker Award | Short Fiction | Won | |
| Night They Missed the Horror Show | 1989 World Fantasy Award | Short Fiction | Nominated | |
| The Drive-In | 1988 Bram Stoker Award | Novel | Nominated | |
| The Drive-In | 1989 Locus Award | Horror Novel | Nominated | |
| The Drive-In | 1989 World Fantasy Award | Novel | Nominated | |
| The Drive-In | 2004 Seiun Award | Translated Long Work | Nominated | |
| "On the Far Side of the Cadillac Desert with Dead Folks" | 1989 Bram Stoker Award | Long Fiction | Won | |
| "On the Far Side of the Cadillac Desert with Dead Folks" | 1990 British Fantasy Award | Short Fiction | Won | |
| "On the Far Side of the Cadillac Desert with Dead Folks" | 1990 World Fantasy Award | Novella | Nominated | |
| By Bizarre Hands | 1989 Bram Stoker Award | Fiction Collection | Nominated | |
| By Bizarre Hands | 1990 Locus Award | Collection | Nominated | |
| By Bizarre Hands | 1990 World Fantasy Award | Collection | Nominated | |
| The Steel Valentine | 1990 Locus Award | Short Story | Nominated | |
| Razored Saddles (with Pat LoBrutto) | 1990 World Fantasy Award | Anthology | Nominated | |
| Razored Saddles (with Pat LoBrutto) | 1990 Locus Award | Anthology | Nominated | |
| Savage Season | 1990 Bram Stoker Award | Novel | Nominated | |
| "Love Doll: A Fable" | 1991 Bram Stoker Award | Short Fiction | Nominated | |
| The Events Concerning a Nude Fold-Out Found in a Harlequin Romance | 1992 Bram Stoker Award | Long Fiction | Won | |
| Jonah Hex: Two-Gun Mojo | 1993 Bram Stoker Award | Other Media | Won | |
| Jonah Hex: Two-Gun Mojo | 1994 International Horror Guild Award | Graphic Story/Illustrated Narrative | Won | |
| Writer of the Purple Rage | 1994 Bram Stoker Award | Fiction Collection | Nominated | |
| Bubba Ho-Tep | 1994 Bram Stoker Award | Long Fiction | Nominated | |
| Weird Business (with Richard Klaw) | 1996 Eisner Awards | Anthology | Nominated | |
| The Big Blow | 1997 Bram Stoker Award | Long Fiction | Won | |
| The Big Blow | 2001 Grand prix de l'Imaginaire | Foreign Short story/Collection of Foreign Short Stories | Nominated | |
| Something Lumber This Way Comes | 1999 Bram Stoker Award | Work for Young Readers | Nominated | |
| Jonah Hex: Shadows West #1 | 1999 Bram Stoker Award | Illustrated Narrative | Nominated | |
| Mad Dog Summer | 1999 Bram Stoker Award | Long Fiction | Won | |
| The Bottoms | 2000 International Horror Guild Award | Novel | Nominated | |
| The Bottoms | 2000 Hammett Prize | | Finalist | |
| The Bottoms | 2001 Anthony Awards | Novel | Nominated | |
| The Bottoms | 2001 Edgar Allan Poe Award | Novel | Won | |
| The Bottoms | 2001 Macavity Awards | Mystery Novel | Nominated | |
| High Cotton: Selected Stories of Joe R. Lansdale | 2001 Locus Award | Collection | Nominated | |
| A Fine Dark Line | 2004 Audie Awards | Mystery | Nominated | |
| Mad Dog Summer and Other Stories | 2005 World Fantasy Award | Collection | Nominated | |
| Retro-Pulp Tales | 2006 Bram Stoker Award | Anthology | Won | |
| Retro-Pulp Tales | 2007 World Fantasy Award | Anthology | Nominated | |
| Cross Plains Universe: Texans Celebrate Robert E. Howard (with Scott A. Cupp) | 2007 World Fantasy Award | Anthology | Nominated | |
| The Shadows, Kith and Kin | 2007 International Horror Guild Award | Collection | Nominated | |
| Leather Maiden | 2008 Black Quill Awards | Dark Genre Novel of the Year | Nominated | |
| The Folding Man | 2010 Bram Stoker Award | Short Fiction | Won | |
| Edge of Dark Water | 2012 Goodreads Choice Awards | Horror | Nominated | |
| Fishing for Dinosaurs | 2014 Bram Stoker Award | Long Fiction | Won | |
| I Tell You It's Love (with Daniele Serra) | 2014 Bram Stoker Award | Graphic Novel | Nominated | |
| The Thicket | 2014 RUSA CODES Reading List | Historical Fiction | Shortlisted | |
| The Steam Man (with Mark Alan Miller) | 2016 Bram Stoker Award | Graphic Novel | Nominated | |
| Paradise Sky | 2016 RUSA CODES Reading List | Historical Fiction | Shortlisted | |
| Paradise Sky | 2016 Spur Award | Western Historical Novel | Won | |
| Apache Witch and Other Poetic Observations | 2021 Bram Stoker Award | Poetry Collection | Nominated | |
| Moon Lake | 2022 Locus Award | Horror Novel | Nominated | |

Other awards or recognitions

- 1994: Mucho Mojo was named a New York Times Notable Book of the Year.
- 2001: Received the Inkpot Award.
- 2007: Received the World Horror Convention Grand Master Award
- 2011: SUGARPRIZE for a body of work during the Sugarpulp Festival & the Grinzane Cavour Prize for Literature for a body of work.
- 2012: Edge of Dark Water was listed Booklist Editors' Choice for Adult Books for Young Adults by the American Library Association.
- 2012: The Horror Writers Association gave him and the late Rick Hautala Bram Stoker Award for Lifetime Achievement for 2011, which they received at the Bram Stoker Awards Banquet in Salt Lake City, Utah on March 31, 2012
- October 2012: Was inducted into The Texas Literary Hall of Fame.
- 2013: His novel The Thicket was voted one of the best historical novels by the Library Journal.
- 2014: Received the Mondello Prize for best Foreign Author.
- 2015: He received the Raymond Chandler lifetime achievement award.

== Adaptations ==
- Incident On and Off a Mountain Road (film)
- Bubba Ho-Tep (film)
- Christmas with the Dead (film)
- Cold in July (film)
- Hap and Leonard (TV series)
- The Thicket (film)

== See also ==
- List of horror fiction authors
- Mojo Press
- Subterranean Press
- Tachyon Publications
- Mulholland Books
