= Železná =

Železná may refer to:

- Železná (Beroun District), a municipality and village in the Central Bohemian Region of the Czech Republic
- Železná Breznica, a municipality and village of the Zvolen District in the Banská Bystrica Region of Slovakia
- Železná Ruda, a town in the Plzeň Region of the Czech Republic

== See also ==
- Bratislava Železná studienka railway station, Slovakia
- Železný (male form)
- Železnice
- Železnik
- Železniki
- Železné
- Železník (disambiguation)
- Željeznica (disambiguation)
