= High Cotton: Selected Stories of Joe R. Lansdale =

2000 collection of short fiction by Joe R. Lansdale

High Cotton
- Author: Joe R. Lansdale
- Cover artist: J.K. Potter
- Language: English
- Genre: Short Story Collection
- Publisher: Golden Gryphon Press
- Publication date: 2000
- Publication place: United States
- Media type: Print (hardback & paperback)
- Pages: 267
- ISBN: 0-9655901-2-7
- Preceded by: The Long Ones (2000)
- Followed by: For a Few Stories More (2002)

High Cotton is a collection of short fiction by Joe R. Lansdale, initially published in 2000. In his introduction, Lansdale cites it as the "Best of Lansdale", and has called this work a companion piece to the 2004 collection Bumper Crop. Initially issued as a hardcover, it has been reissued as a trade paperback.

He provides a brief introduction before each story, offering a description of his intent, and contextualizing each within the history of his career.

== Contents ==
The collection contains:

- "Bob the Dinosaur Goes to Disneyland" {originally published in Midnight Graffiti, Fall 1989}
- "Booty and the Beast" {originally published in Archon Gaming (1995)}
- "By Bizarre Hands" {originally published in Hardboiled #9 (1988)}
- "By the Hair of the Head" {originally published in Shadows #6, ed. Charles L. Grant (1983)}
- "Drive-In Date" {originally published in Night Visions 8 (1991)}
- "Dog, Cat, and Baby" {originally published in Masques #2, ed. J. N. Williamson (1987)}
- "The Fat Man and the Elephant" {originally published in By Bizarre Hands (1989)}
- "Godzilla's Twelve Step Program" {originally published in Writer of the Purple Rage (1994)}
- "Incident On and Off a Mountain Road" {originally published in Night Visions 8 (1991)}
- "The Job" {originally published in Razored Saddles, ed. Joe R. Lansdale & Pat LoBrutto (1989)}
- "Letter From the South, Two Moons West of Nacogdoches" {originally published in Last Wave #5 (1986)}
- "Mister Weed-Eater" {previously published by Cahill Press, 1993}
- "My Dead Dog Bobby" {originally published in The Horror Show, Summer 1987}
- "Night They Missed the Horror Show" (winner of Bram Stoker Award) {originally published in Silver Scream, ed. David J. Schow (1988)}
- "Not from Detroit" (based on scene from The Nightrunners) {originally published in Midnight Graffiti, Fall 1988}
- "The Phone Woman" {originally published in Night Visions 8 (1991)}
- "The Pit" {originally published in The Black Lizard Anthology of Crime Fiction, ed. Ed Gorman (1987)}
- "The Steel Valentine" {originally published in By Bizarre Hands (1989)}
- "Steppin' Out, Summer, '68" {originally published in Night Visions 8 (1991)}
- "Tight Little Stitches in a Dead Man's Back" {originally published in Nukes, ed. John Maclay (1986)}
- "Trains Not Taken" {originally published in RE:AL Spring (1987)}

== Reception ==
The Denver Post wrote that it "serves as a good introduction to Lansdale's fiction... The tales are as weird and hard-edged as we've come to expect from Lansdale." The Rocky Mountain News called it his best collection. Fantasy & Science Fiction reviewed it, noting it is a compilation of "the stories that built Lansdale's reputation as one of the most audacious writers to come out of the eighties... High Cotton is only for the strong at heart, the fearless reader who can face its powerful subject matter as unflinchingly as did the author."
