= Bumper Crop =

2004 collection of short stories by Joe R. Lansdale

- Author: Joe R. Lansdale
- Cover artist: John Picacio
- Language: English
- Genre: Short story collection
- Publisher: Golden Gryphon Press
- Publication date: 2004
- Publication place: United States
- Media type: Print (hardback & paperback)
- Pages: 199
- ISBN: 1-930846-24-X
- Preceded by: A Little Green Book of Monster Stories (2003)
- Followed by: Mad Dog Summer and other Stories (2004)

Bumper Crop is a collection of short stories by Joe R. Lansdale published in 2004 by Golden Gryphon Press. In his introduction, he cites it as the companion piece to High Cotton, because he had so many stories which didn't quite fit in with the "Best of" but were more like "personal favorites." Initially issued as a hardcover, it has been reissued as a trade paperback.

In his introduction, Lansdale explains that the term bumper crop refers to a harvest which is so plentiful that it exceeds all expectations; the excess harvest is the "bumper crop."

== Stories collected ==
| Title | Originally published in |
|---|---|
| Forward: The Remains of My Days ... | |
| God of the Razor | Grue #5, 1987 |
| The Dump | Twilight Zone Magazine, July 1981 |
| Fish Night | Specter! ed. Bill Pronzini (1982) |
| Chompers | Twilight Zone Magazine, July 1982 |
| The Fat Man | The Horror Show, January 1987 |
| On a Dark October | The Horror Show, Spring 1984 |
| The Shaggy House | The Horror Show, Fall 1986 |
| The Man Who Dreamed | The Horror Show, Fall 1984 |
| Walks | Cemetery Dance, Fall 1997 |
| Last of the Hopeful | The Good, The Bad, and the Indifferent (1997) |
| Duck Hunt | After Midnight, ed. Charles L. Grant (1986) |
| Down by the Sea Near the Great Big Rock | Masques #1, ed. J. N. Williamson (1984) |
| I Tell You It's Love | Modern Stories (1983) |
| Pilots [co-authored with Dan Lowry] | Stalkers, ed. Gorman & Greenberg (1989) |
| In the Cold, Dark Time | Dark Harvest Summer/Fall Preview: 1990 |
| Bar Talk | New Blood #7 (1990) |
| Listen | Twilight Zone Magazine, May/June 1983 |
| Personality Problem | Twilight Zone Magazine, January/February 1983 |
| A Change of Lifestyle [co-authored with Karen Lansdale] | Twilight Zone Magazine, November/December 1984 |
| The Companion [co-authored with Keith and Kasey Joe Lansdale] | Great Writers & Kids Write Spooky Stories, ed. Greenberg, Morgan & Weinberg (1995) |
| Old Charlie | The Saint Magazine, August 1984 |
| Billie Sue | A Fistfull of Stories (1996) |
| Bestsellers Guaranteed | Espionage Magazine, May 1985 |
| Fire Dog | The Silver Gryphon, ed. Gary Turner & Marty Halpern (2003) |
| Cowboy | The Good, The Bad, and the Indifferent (1997) |
| Master of Misery | Warriors of Blood and Dream, ed. Roger Zelazny & Greenberg (1995) |
