= Stories by Mama Lansdale's Youngest Boy =

1991 compilation of short work by Joe R. Lansdale

First edition (original title)

Stories by Mama Lansdale's Youngest Boy is an early compilation of short work by Joe R. Lansdale, published in 1991. It was initially published as issue number 18 of Author's Choice Monthly.

It contains:

- Bestsellers Guaranteed (originally published in Espionage Magazine, May 1985)
- Bob the Dinosaur Goes to Disneyland (originally published in Midnight Graffiti, Fall 1989)
- By the Hair of the Head (originally published in Shadows #6, ed. Charles L. Grant, 1983)
- Chompers (originally published in Twilight Zone, July 1982)
- Dog, Cat, and Baby (originally published in Masques #2, ed. J. N. Williamson, 1987)
- The Dump (originally published in Twilight Zone, Jul 1981)
- The Fat Man (originally published in The Horror Show, Jan 1987)
- God of the Razor (heavily reworked excerpt of The Nightrunners) (originally published in Grue #5, 1987)
- The Job (originally published in Razored Saddles, ed. Joe R. Lansdale & Pat LoBrutto, 1989)
- My Dead Dog Bobby (originally published in The Horror Show, Summer 1987)
- Not From Detroit (originally published in Midnight Graffiti, Fall 1988)
- On a Dark October (originally published in The Horror Show, Spring 1984)
- Pentecostal Punk Rock (originally published in Deathrealm, Summer 1989)
- The Shaggy House (originally published in The Horror Show, Fall 1986)
- The White Rabbit (originally published in The Arbor House Necropolis, ed. Bill Pronzini, 1981)

All of the stories in this collection were reprinted the next year in Bestsellers Guaranteed (with one addition), although these collections are the only collections which include Pentecostal Punk Rock and The White Rabbit.
