= Bestsellers Guaranteed =

1993 collection of short fiction by Joe R. Lansdale

First edition (publ. Ace Books) Cover art by Mark Ferrari

Bestsellers Guaranteed is a collection of short fiction by American writer Joe R. Lansdale, published in May 1993.

== Contents ==
- "Bestsellers Guaranteed" (originally published in Espionage Magazine, May 1985)
- "Bob the Dinosaur Goes to Disneyland" (originally published in Midnight Graffiti, Fall 1989)
- "By the Hair of the Head" (originally published in Shadows #6, ed. Charles L. Grant (1983))
- "Chompers" (originally published in Twilight Zone Magazine, July 1982)
- "Dog, Cat, and Baby" (originally published in Masques #2, ed. J. N. Williamson (1987))
- "The Dump" (originally published in Twilight Zone Magazine, July 1981)
- "The Events Concerning a Nude Fold-Out Found in a Harlequin Romance" (winner of Bram Stoker Award) (originally published in Dark at Heart, ed. Joe & Karen Lansdale (1992))
- "The Fat Man" (originally published in The Horror Show, Jan 1987)
- "God of the Razor" (heavily reworked excerpt of The Nightrunners) (originally published in Grue #5, 1987)
- "The Job" (originally published in Razored Saddles, ed. Joe R. Lansdale & Pat LoBrutto (1989))
- "My Dead Dog Bobby" (originally published in The Horror Show, Summer 1987)
- "Not From Detroit" (originally published in Midnight Graffiti, Fall 1988)
- "On a Dark October" (originally published in The Horror Show, Spring 1984)
- "Pentecostal Punk Rock" (originally published in Deathrealm, Summer 1989)
- "The Shaggy House" (originally published in The Horror Show, Fall 1986)
- "The White Rabbit" (originally published in The Arbor House Necropolis, ed. Bill Pronzini (1981))

All of the stories (except for "Events Concerning ...") in this collection were printed the previous year in Stories by Mama Lansdale's Youngest Boy, but this collection had a larger print run. These collections are the only collections which include "Pentecostal Punk Rock", and "The White Rabbit" has only subsequently been printed in the extremely limited edition A Little Green Book of Monster Stories.
