= Jesenovec, Železniki =

Jesenovec
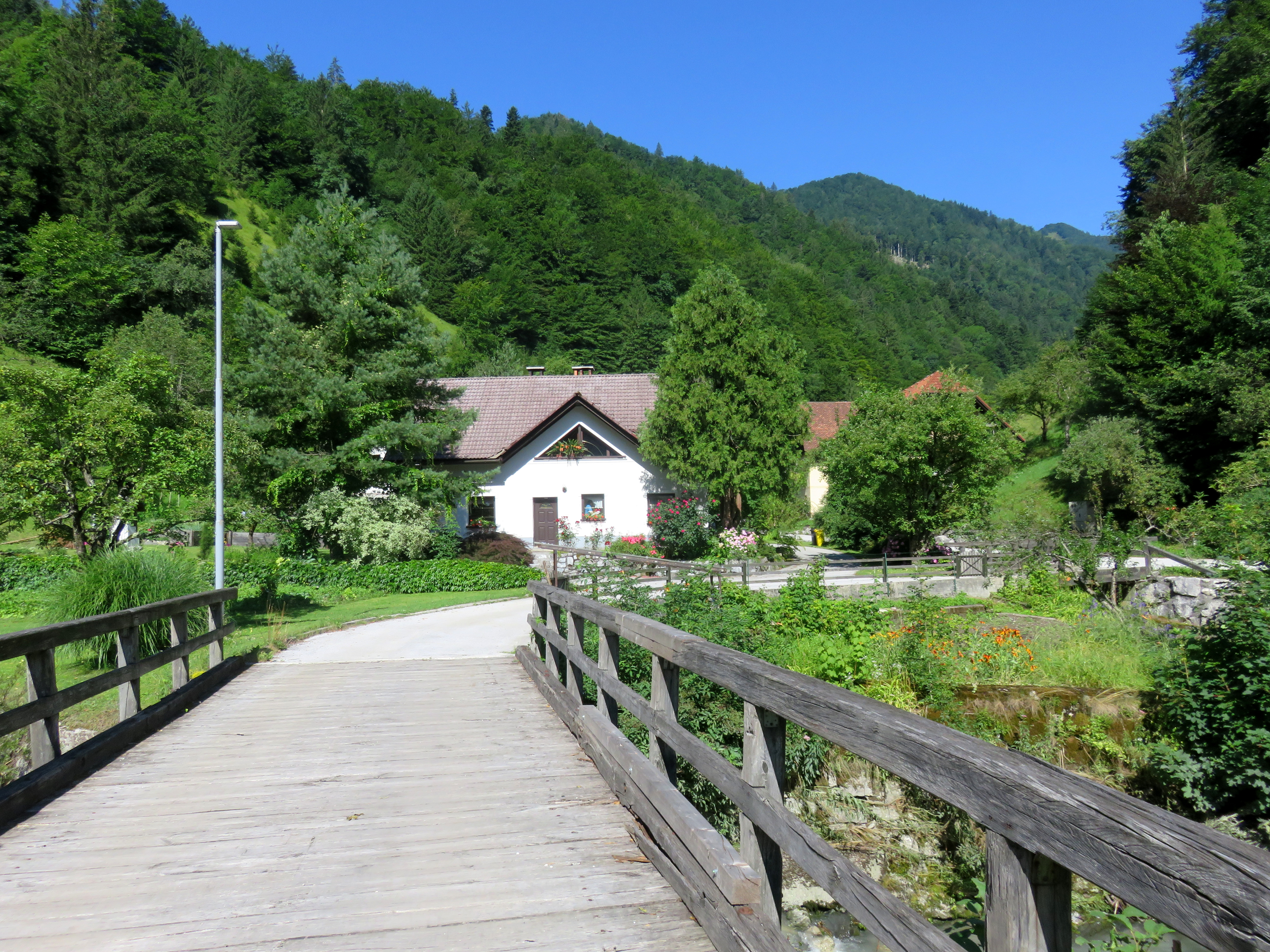

- Location in Slovenia
- Coordinates: 46°12′37″N 14°07′31″E
- Country: Slovenia
- Traditional Region: Upper Carniola
- Statistical region: Upper Carniola
- Municipality: Železniki
- Elevation: 500 m (1,600 ft)

Jesenovec (pronounced [jɛsɛˈnoːʋəts]; in older sources also Jesenovc) is a formerly independent settlement in the Municipality of Železniki in the Upper Carniola region of Slovenia. It is now part of the town of Železniki.

== Geography ==
Jesenovec is a scattered settlement along the road from Škofja Loka to Petrovo Brdo in the upper Selca Sora Valley between Plešenica Creek and Upper Smoleva Creek (Slovene: Zadnja Smoleva). It includes the Plenšak Gorge below Prtovč and the Blok and Slap gorges below Štedel Peak (Slovene: Štedel vrh; elevation: 1,145 meters or 3,757 feet). Other nearby elevations include Mount Groblje (elevation: 1,086 meters or 3,563 feet) and Grebel Peak (Slovene: Grebel vrh; elevation: 1,348 meters or 4,423 feet) to the northwest and Mount Vancovec (elevation: 1,085 meters or 3,560 feet) to the southeast.

== Name ==
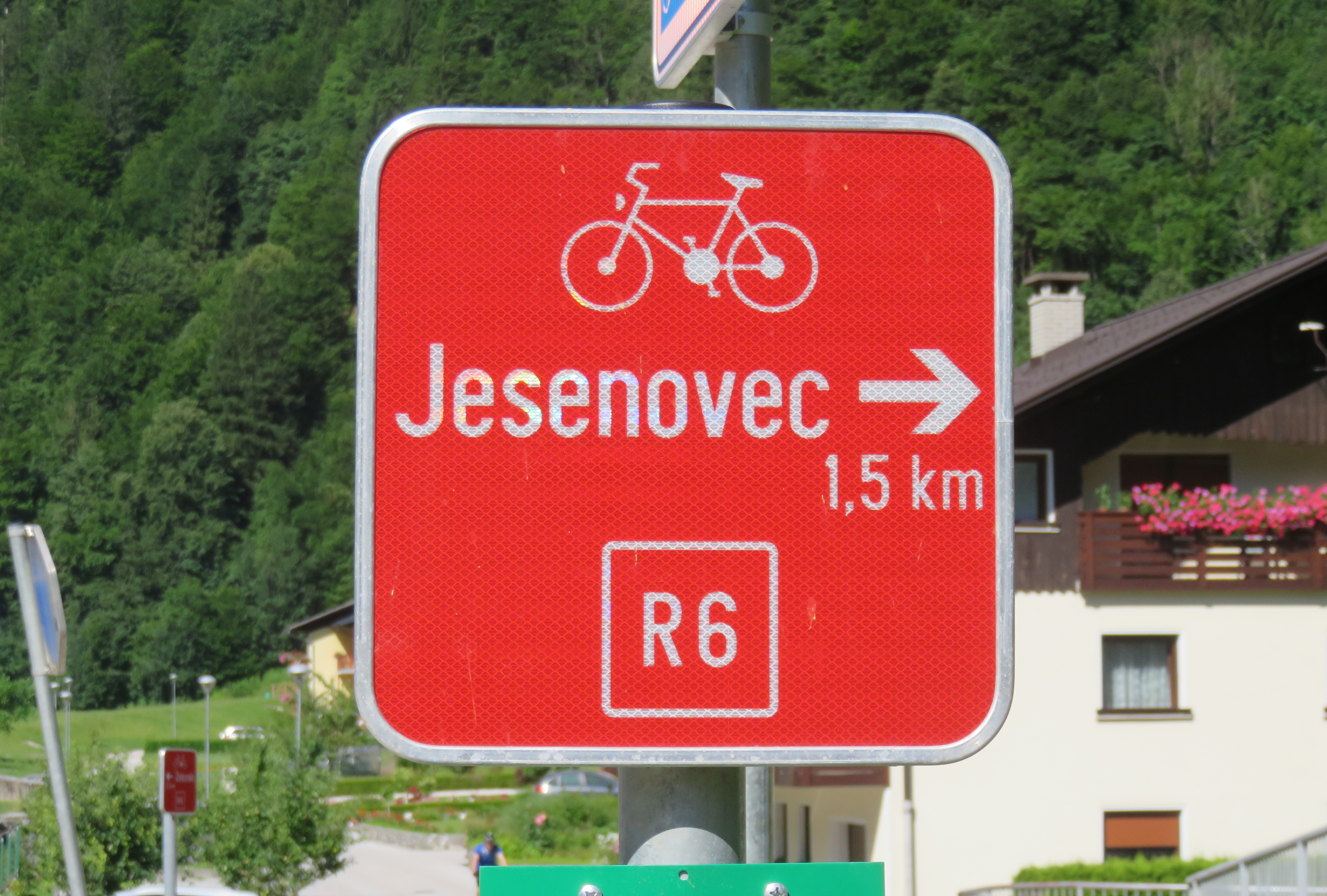
A sign for Jesenovec

The name Jesenovec is derived from the common noun jesen 'ash tree', thus originally referring to the local vegetation.

== History ==
Jesenovec had a population of 31 living in four houses in 1880, 26 living in four houses in 1890, 27 living in four houses in 1900, 23 in three houses in 1931, and 40 in seven houses in 1961. Jesenovec was annexed by Železniki in 1966, ending its existence as a separate settlement.
