= List of Author's Choice Monthly =

Author's Choice Monthly was a series of 29 short story collections that ran from 1989 through 1992. They were published by Pulphouse Publishing. They tended to be fairly short (in the 100 page range) and were produced in three different states:

- An unsigned trade paperback state (usually around 1,000 copies)
- A signed hardback state of 300 copies
- A signed, leatherbound hardback state of 75 copies

However, like many Pulphouse titles, frequently there were additional unspecified numbers of "PC" (Publisher's Copies) available, including one in a red leather "staff state."

1. The Old Funny Stuff, by George Alec Effinger, October 1989
2. Unthreatened by the Morning Light, by Karl Edward Wagner, November 1989
3. Daily Voices, by Lisa Goldstein, December 1989
4. Nine Hard Questions About the Nature of the Universe, by Lewis Shiner, January 1990
5. Into the Eighth Decade, by Jack Williamson, February 1990
6. Peripheral Vision, by Karen Joy Fowler, March 1990
7. Neon Twilight, by Edward Bryant, April 1990
8. Swatting at the Cosmos, by James Morrow, May 1990
9. Heroines, by James Patrick Kelly, June 1990
10. Tales from a Vanished Country, by Elizabeth A. Lynn, July 1990
11. Skyrocket Steele Conquers the Universe, by Ron Goulart, August 1990
12. True Minds, by Spider Robinson, September 1990
13. Ad Statum Perspicuum, by F. Paul Wilson, October 1990
14. Legacy of Fire, by Nina Kiriki Hoffman, November 1990
15. Most Emphatically Not SF, Almost, by Michael Bishop, December 1990
16. State of Grace, by Kate Wilhelm, January 1991
17. Ma Qui and Other Phantoms, by Alan Brennert, February 1991
18. Stories by Mama Lansdale's Youngest Boy, by Joe Lansdale, March 1991
19. Two That Came True, by Judith Moffett, April 1991
20. A Sensitive Dependence on Initial Conditions, by Kim Stanley Robinson, May 1991
21. God's Nose, by Damon Knight, June 1991
22. Hedgework and Guessery, by Charles de Lint, July 1991
23. It's Been Fun, by Esther Friesner, August 1991
24. The Naked Flesh of Feeling, by J. N. Williamson, September 1991
25. The Alien Heart, by Mike Resnick, October 1991
26. Myths, Legends, and True History, by Geoffrey A. Landis, November 1991
27. Gone to Earth, by Roger Zelazny, December 1991
28. Wong's Lost and Found Emporium and Other Oddities, by William F. Wu, June 1992
29. Moonstone and Tiger-Eye, by Suzy McKee Charnas, August 1992
