= Češnjica, Železniki =

Češnjica
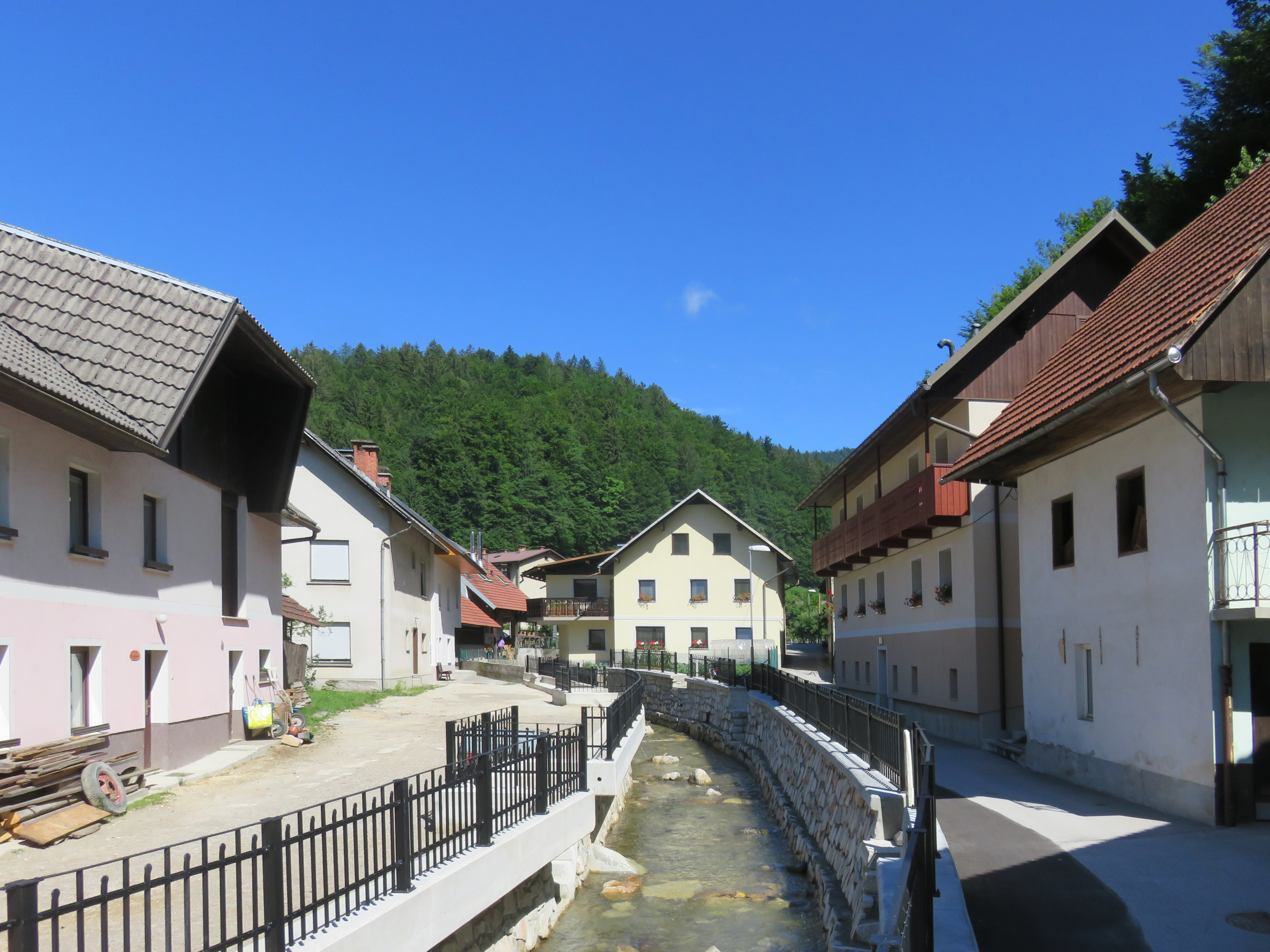

- Location in Slovenia
- Coordinates: 46°13′34″N 14°10′10″E
- Country: Slovenia
- Traditional Region: Upper Carniola
- Statistical region: Upper Carniola
- Municipality: Železniki
- Elevation: 450 m (1,480 ft)

Češnjica (pronounced [ˈtʃeːʃnjitsa]; in older sources also Češenjica, German: Tscheschenza) is a formerly independent settlement in the Municipality of Železniki in the Upper Carniola region of Slovenia. It is now part of the town of Železniki.

== Geography ==
Češnjica is a clustered settlement along Češnjica Creek, a tributary of the Selca Sora River, above the road from Škofja Loka to Petrovo Brdo. Štalca Hill (elevation: 642 meters or 2,106 feet) rises to the east.

== Name ==
Češnjica was attested as Chersteten in 1291, Kersteten in 1426, and Tschresnitzi in 1500, among other spellings. The name Češnjica is shared with several other places in Slovenia. It is derived from the common noun češnja 'wild cherry', thus referring to the local vegetation.

== History ==
Češnjica had a population of 231 living in 28 houses in 1870, 204 living in 29 houses in 1880, 214 living in 31 houses in 1890, and 200 living in 31 houses in 1900. Češnjica was annexed by Železniki in 1966, ending its existence as a separate settlement.

== Notable people ==
Notable people that were born or lived in Češnjica include the following:

- Urška Dolinarka (born 1457), farmer and folk heroine
- Franz Xaver Jellenz (1749–1805), lawyer
- Janko Prezelj, nom de guerre Stane (1923–?), Partisan commander
