= Škovine =

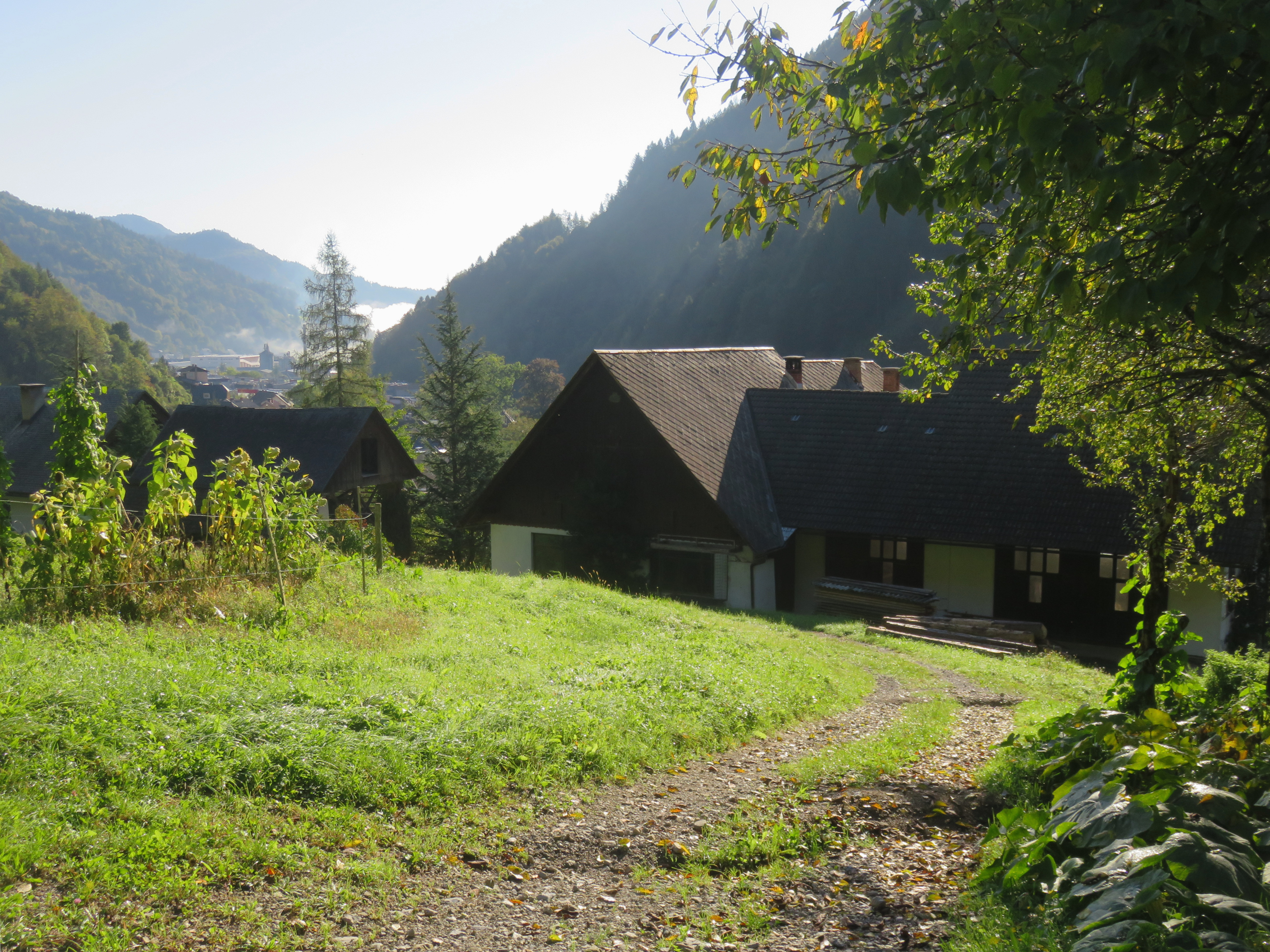

- Location in Slovenia
- Coordinates: 46°13′18″N 14°09′18″E
- Country: Slovenia
- Traditional Region: Upper Carniola
- Statistical region: Upper Carniola
- Municipality: Železniki
- Elevation: 465 m (1,526 ft)

Škovine (pronounced [ʃkɔˈʋiːnɛ]) is a formerly independent settlement in the Municipality of Železniki in the Upper Carniola region of Slovenia. It is now part of the town of Železniki.

== Geography ==
Škovine lies in the area above Saint Anthony's Church in Železniki along the road from Škofja Loka to Petrovo Brdo. Sovinik Creek, a tributary of the Selca Sora, flows through a ravine to the west, and Snegovnik Hill rises to the north.

== Name ==
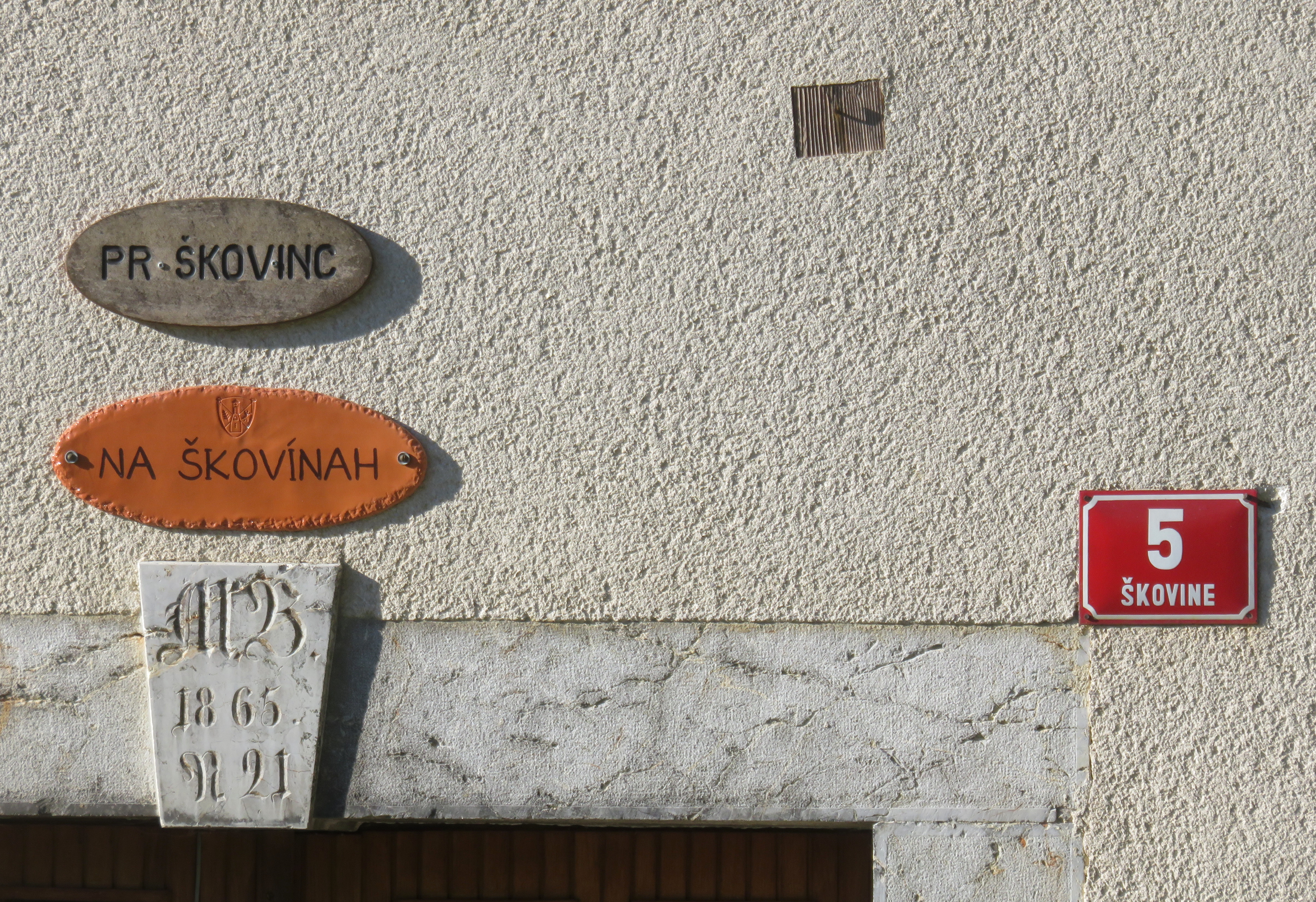
House signs in Škovine

Škovine was attested in written sources in 1291 as In der Zaueritz, in 1348 as Zeyerfeld, in 1379 as Czevrueld, in 1485–1490 as Souerskiniue, and in 1630 as Sauerski niui insgemein na Skouinach. It has been suggested that the name is a corruption of sorške njive 'Sora fields'.

== History ==
Škovine was founded during the first wave of Slovene colonization in the area—that is, before the end of the 13th century. As a result, it had an agricultural character, and it was administratively separate from the ironworking market town of Železniki. A sawmill formerly operated along Sovinik Creek.

Škovine had a population of 25 in six houses in 1931 and 31 in four houses in 1961. Škovine was annexed by Železniki in 1966, ending its existence as a separate settlement.
