= A Little Green Book of Monster Stories =

2003 collection of short stories by Joe R. Lansdale

- First edition
- Author: Joe R. Lansdale
- Language: English
- Genre: Short story
- Publisher: Borderlands Press
- Publication date: 2003
- Publication place: United States
- Media type: Print (hardback)
- Pages: 106
- ISBN: 978-1880325414
- Preceded by: For a Few Stories More
- Followed by: Bumper Crop

A Little Green Book of Monster Stories is a collection of short stories written by American author Joe R. Lansdale, published by Borderlands Press as part of their "Little Book" series. It was limited to five hundred copies.

It contained the following stories, and possibly one more not listed here:

- "Artificial Man"
- "Bar Talk" (originally published in New Blood #7, 1990)
- "Bob the Dinosaur Goes to Disneyland" (originally published in Midnight Graffiti, Fall 1989)
- "Chompers" (originally published in Twilight Zone Magazine, July 1982)
- "The Dump" (originally published in Twilight Zone Magazine, July 1981)
- "Huitzilopochtli" (originally published in The Good, The Bad, and the Indifferent, 1997)
- "Night They Missed the Horror Show" (originally published in Silver Scream, ed. David J. Schow (1988))
- "Personality Problem" (originally published in Twilight Zone Magazine, Jan/Feb 1983)
- "The White Rabbit" (originally published in The Arbor House Necropolis, ed. Bill Pronzini (1981))

"Artificial Man" has never been published anywhere else, and "The White Rabbit" has only been collected in the now out-of-print Bestsellers Guaranteed.
