= Hydrography of Montenegro =

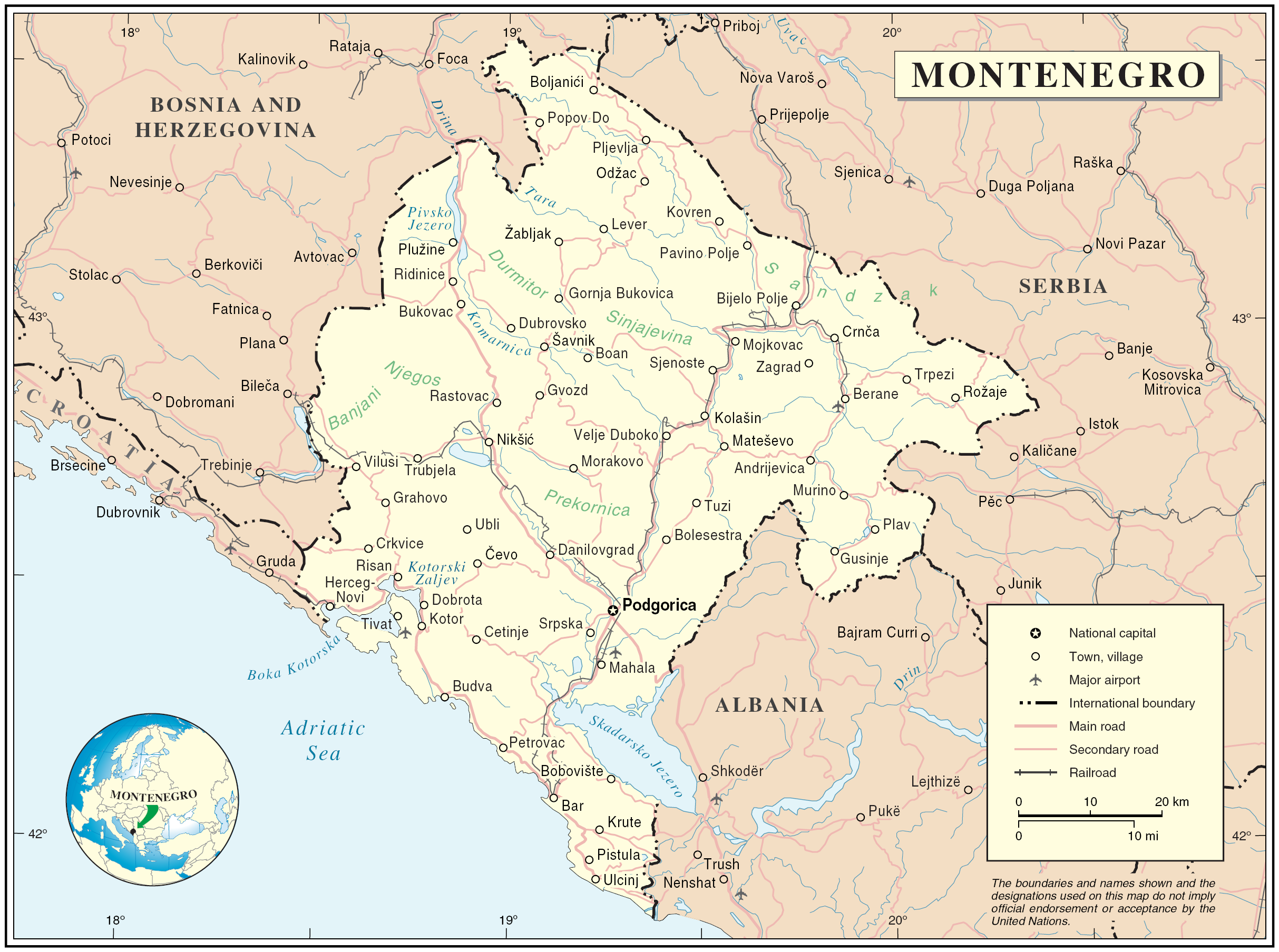
A map of Montenegro.

The hydrography of Montenegro is defined by the interaction of a Mediterranean climate and mountainous landscape. It is further distinguished by the dominance of karst aquifers, which significantly alter surface drainage patterns and produce highly variable discharge regimes.

Despite its small area, Montenegro has a complex network of surface and groundwater systems, with high specific runoff and a strong dependence on underground channels.

== Physiographic and Climatic Controls ==
Montenegro's hydrographic regime is strongly influenced by its physical geography. The country features a narrow Adriatic coastal plain backed by the steep limestone massifs of the Dinaric Alps, including high-relief karst plateaus and poljes.

Along the coast, the climate predominantly consists of hot, dry summers and wetter autumns. On the other hand, this transitions to continental and alpine conditions inland. Orographic effects result in extremely high precipitation in some coastal mountain areas, such as Orjen, which is among the highest in Europe. Despite this, significant portions of the terrain experience relative water scarcity, including Orjen, Lovćen, Rumija, and Katunska Nahija. This is due to rapid infiltration into karstified limestone, indicating that the amount of precipitation and surface runoff are not directly correlated.

== Drainage Basins ==
The country is divided between two major drainage systems:

- The Adriatic Sea basin
- The Black Sea basin via the Danube River system

The Adriatic Sea basin occupies approximately 6,560 km^{2} (45.4% of the national territory) and includes both direct coastal drainage and the complex Lake Skadar system. Major rivers include the Morača, Zeta, and Bojana, while additional shorter coastal rivers such as the Sutorina and Željeznica discharge directly into the Adriatic Sea. The Morača–Zeta system forms the principal hydrological axis of the basin, draining into Lake Skadar before flowing out via the Bojana River to the Adriatic. Karstification significantly reduces surface drainage density in this basin, with large volumes of precipitation infiltrating into underground conduits. As a result, river flow regimes are highly variable and groundwater-fed springs play a major hydrological role.

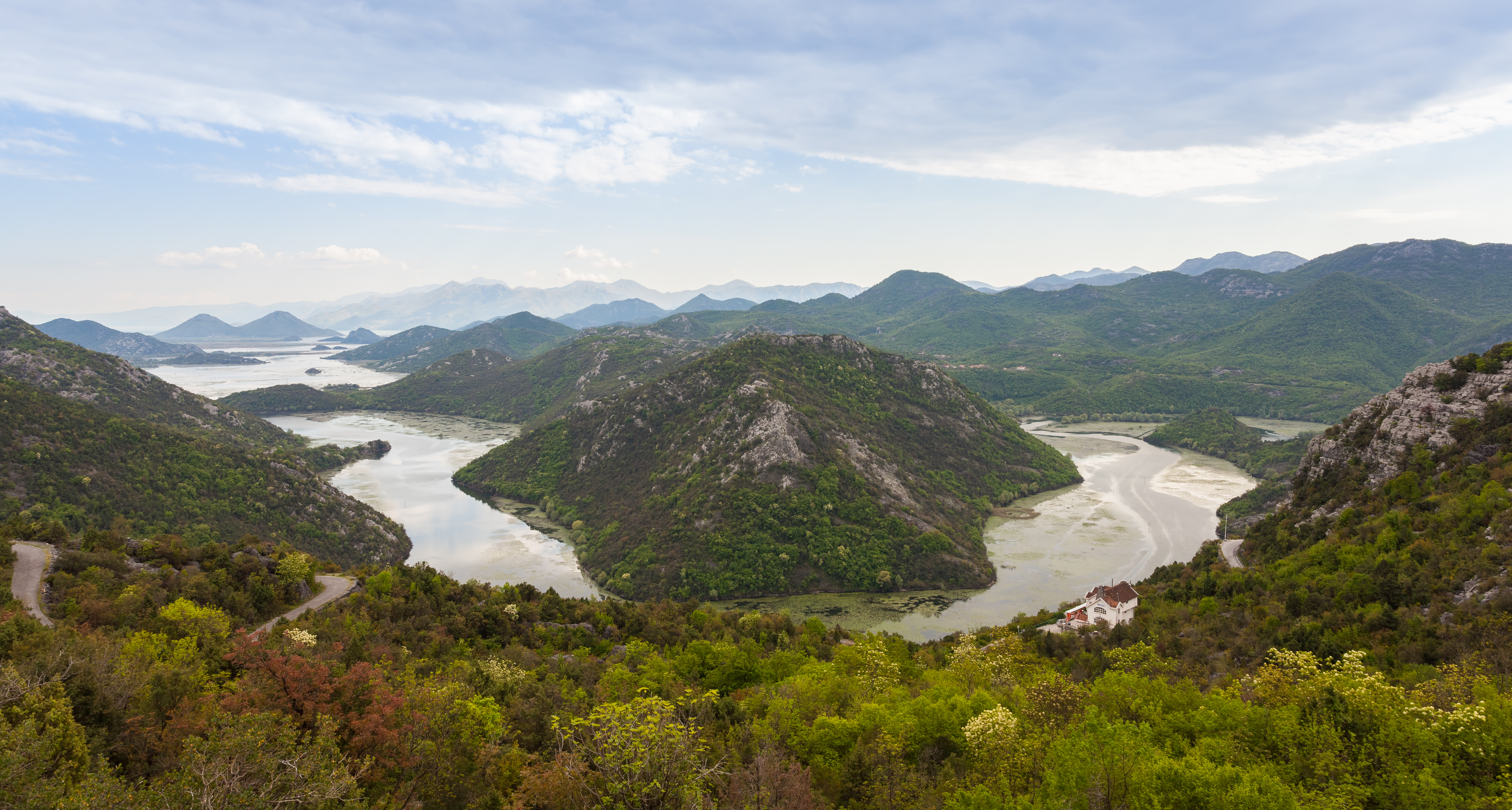
Lake Skadar.

The Black Sea basin covers approximately 7,545 km^{2} (54.6% of the national territory) and drains northward into the Danube through the Drina and Morava River systems. Principal rivers include the Tara, Riva, Lim, Ćehotina, and Ibar. Specifically, the Tara and Piva rivers form the Drina River system, which places Montenegro within the international Danube basin managed by the International Commission for the Protection of the Danube River. These rivers have more continuous flow compared to those in the Adriatic Sea basin due to less intense karstification in some areas, and greater integration of their catchments.

== Rivers and Lakes ==
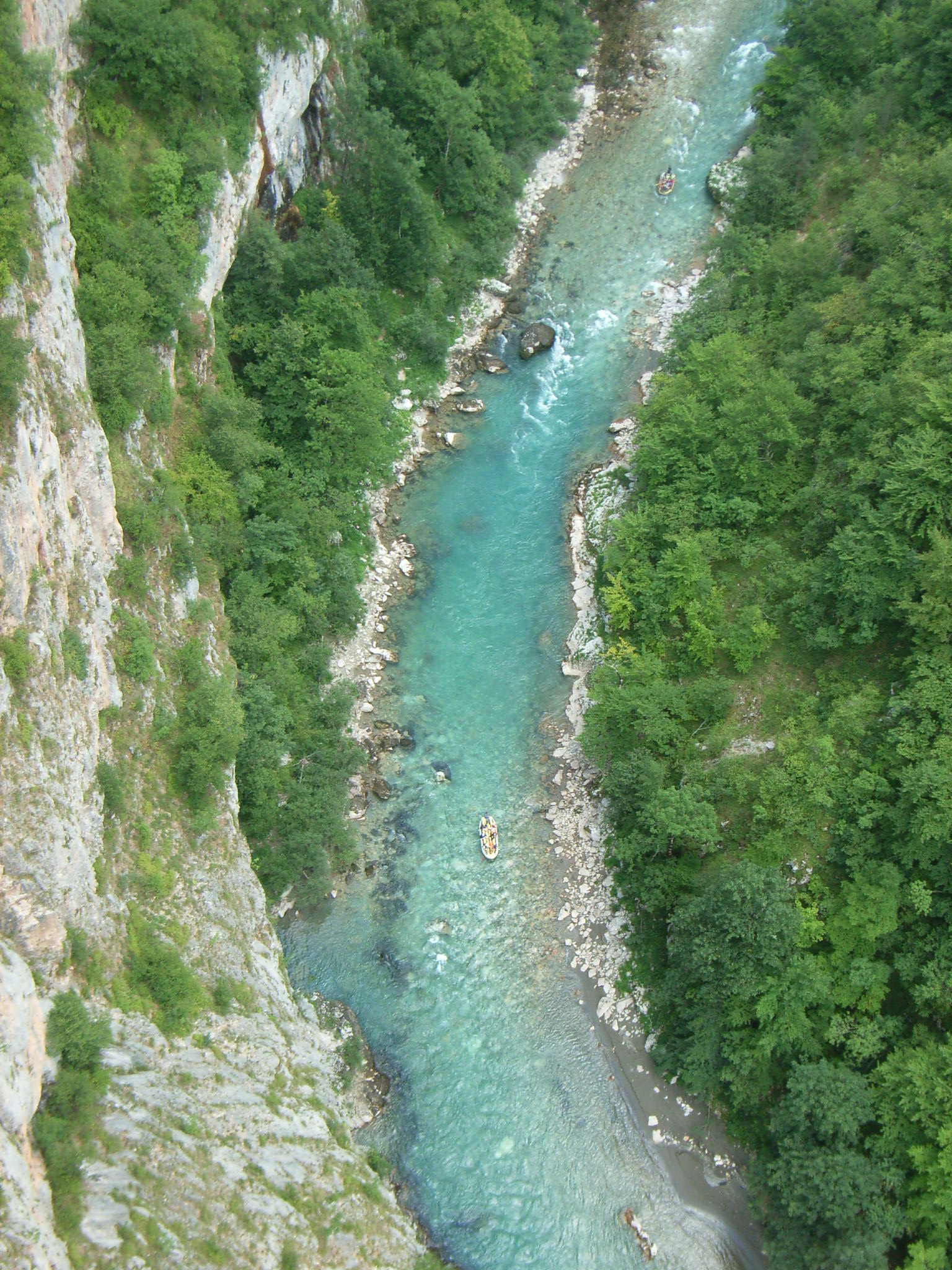
Tara River Canyon.

Montenegrin rivers are characterised by steep slopes, fast-flowing water, deep canyons, and strong seasonal changes in flow. The Tara River Canyon is particularly notable as one of Europe's deepest canyons, and the river itself maintains relatively high water quality and ecological integrity.

Hydrologically, rivers exhibit pluvio-nival regimes:

- Peak discharge in winter and spring, due to rainfall and snow melt
- Minimum discharge in summer

Karst influence results in extreme variability, with some streams experiencing intermittent flow or losing sections in the form of ponors, while others are sustained by large karst springs. The average specific runoff is approximately 19.5 km^{3}/year.

Montenegro has numerous natural lakes, of which Lake Skadar, the largest lake in the Balkans by surface area, is the most significant. It is part of a complex water system connected to the Drin-Bojana river network, with a total catchment of approximately 20,000 km^{2} spanning Montenegro, Albania, Serbia, North Macedonia, and Greece. The lake is supplied by both surface rivers, such as the Morača, and underground karst springs.

Artificial lakes play an important role in hydropower generation and regional energy production. These include significant reservoirs on the Piva River system, and the structures regulate flow in the upper Drina basin.

== Karst Systems and Groundwater ==
Karst hydrogeology dominates Montenegro's water systems. Carbonate rocks, such as limestone and dolomite, create:

- Highly permeable aquifers
- Underground drainage networks
- Large karst springs
- Poljes with seasonal flooding

Groundwater circulation often transcends surface watershed boundaries in the country, making it difficult to clearly define drainage areas. Much of the rainfall quickly seeps into the ground instead of flowing over the surface, which reduces surface runoff, delays the release of water from springs, and closely links underground and surface water systems. As a result, even areas with high rainfall may not have reliable surface water supplies.

== Water Resources, Usage, and Challenges ==
Montenegro is considered one of the most water-rich countries in Europe. Approximately 95% of its water resources originate within its territory, indicating high hydrological self-sufficiency. However, water availability is unevenly distributed:

- Around 35% of the territory experiences chronic water shortages
- Around 10% of the territory faces seasonal excess water or flood risks

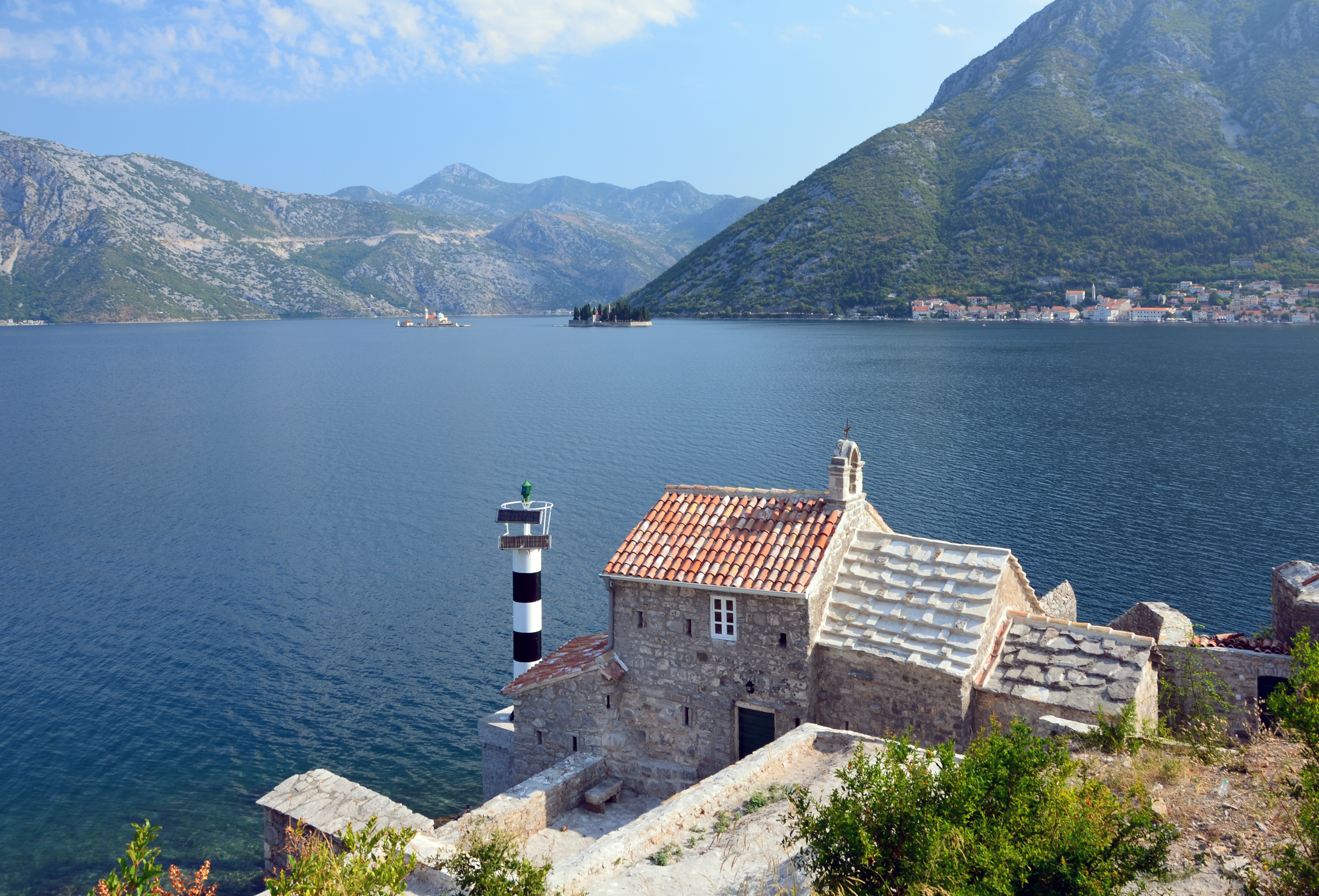
The Bay of Kotor, a popular Montenegrin tourist destination.

The per-capita water consumption is significantly higher than in Western Europe, and seasonal water stress is particularly acute in coastal areas during peak tourism periods. Key challenges in Montenegro's hydrography include:

- Karst-induced water loss and uneven spatial distribution
- Seasonal variability and drought conditions
- Flooding in lowlands and poljes
- Infrastructure inefficiency and high water losses
- Trans-boundary water management (Danube and Skadar systems)
