= The King and Other Stories =

2005 collection of short stories by Joe R. Lansdale

- Author: Joe R. Lansdale
- Cover artist: Glenn Chadbourne
- Language: English
- Publisher: Subterranean Press
- Publication date: 2005
- Publication place: United States
- Media type: Print (hardcover, limited edition)
- Pages: 98
- ISBN: 1-59606-010-7
- Preceded by: Mad Dog Summer (2004)
- Followed by: The God of the Razor (2007)

The King and Other Stories is a collection of short stories by American author Joe R. Lansdale. This book was published as a limited edition by Subterranean Press. It is long out of print.

== Table of contents ==
- Introduction
- Regular Sex and Admiration
- An Arrow in the Air
- Boots
- Levitation
- Beatcha
- Haunted House
- Ducks
- Willard and the Painting
- Coronation
- The Closet
- Private Eye
- Snake
- Terry and the Hat
- The Munchies
- After the War
- Little Blue Bottle
- Goodies
- The King
