= Mad Dog Summer and Other Stories =

2004 collection of short stories by Joe R. Lansdale

- Limited Subterranean Press edition cover
- Author: Joe R. Lansdale
- Cover artist: Timothy Truman
- Language: English
- Publisher: Subterranean Press, Golden Gryphon Press
- Publication date: 2004
- Publication place: United States
- Media type: Print (hardcover)
- Pages: 289
- ISBN: 1-931081-29-8
- Preceded by: Bumper Crop (2004)
- Followed by: The King and Other Stories (2005)

Mad Dog Summer and Other Stories, is a collection of short stories by Joe R. Lansdale, first published in 2004 in a limited edition by Subterranean Press. It was reissued in paperback in 2006 by Golden Gryphon Press. Both Subterranean Press editions have long sold out.

It contains:

- "Mad Dog Summer" (won a Bram Stoker Award and was originally published in 999: New Stories of Horror & Suspense, ed Al Sarrantonio) (1999)
- "The Mule Rustlers" (originally published in The Mysterious Press Anniversary Anthology, ed. Freed and Malloy) (2001)
- "O’Reta: Snapshot Memories" (originally published in Mothers and Sons, ed. Jill Morgan) (2000)
- "Rainy Weather" (it won a Bram Stoker Award, and was a shorter version of what became The Big Blow; originally published in Cemetery Dance #30) (1998)
- "Screwup" (co-written by Karen Lansdale; originally published in Till Death Do Us Part, ed. Jill M. Morgan & Martin H. Greenberg) (1999)
- "The Steam Man of the Prairie and the Dark Rider Get Down" (originally published in The Long Ones) (1999)
- "Veil's Visit" (a Hap and Leonard short story co-written with Andrew Vachss) (originally published in Veil's Visit: A Taste of Hap and Leonard) (2001)
- "Way Down There" (first publication)

An early, extremely limited pressing had the script for the graphic novel Red Range, as well as the other Hap and Leonard story "Death by Chili".
