= Urška Dolinarka =

15th-century Slovenian folk heroine

- Born: Urška; 1457; Češnjica, Duchy of Carniola
- Died: Davča, Duchy of Carniola
- Occupation: Farmer
- Known for: Leading the people of Davče against the Ottoman Turks

Urška, (Note: Dolinarka is an epithet, not a surname. Urška had no surname. Her appositive epithet Dolinarka and the attributive epithet Dolinarjeva mean 'from the valley' in Slovene—in this case, the Selca Valley, where she was born.) also known as Urška Dolinarka (Urška from the Valley), was a Slovenian farmer and folk heroine born in 1457 in Češnjica, Duchy of Carniola (in what is now Slovenia). She is renowned for her resistance against the Ottoman Turks in the Selca Valley.

== Childhood ==
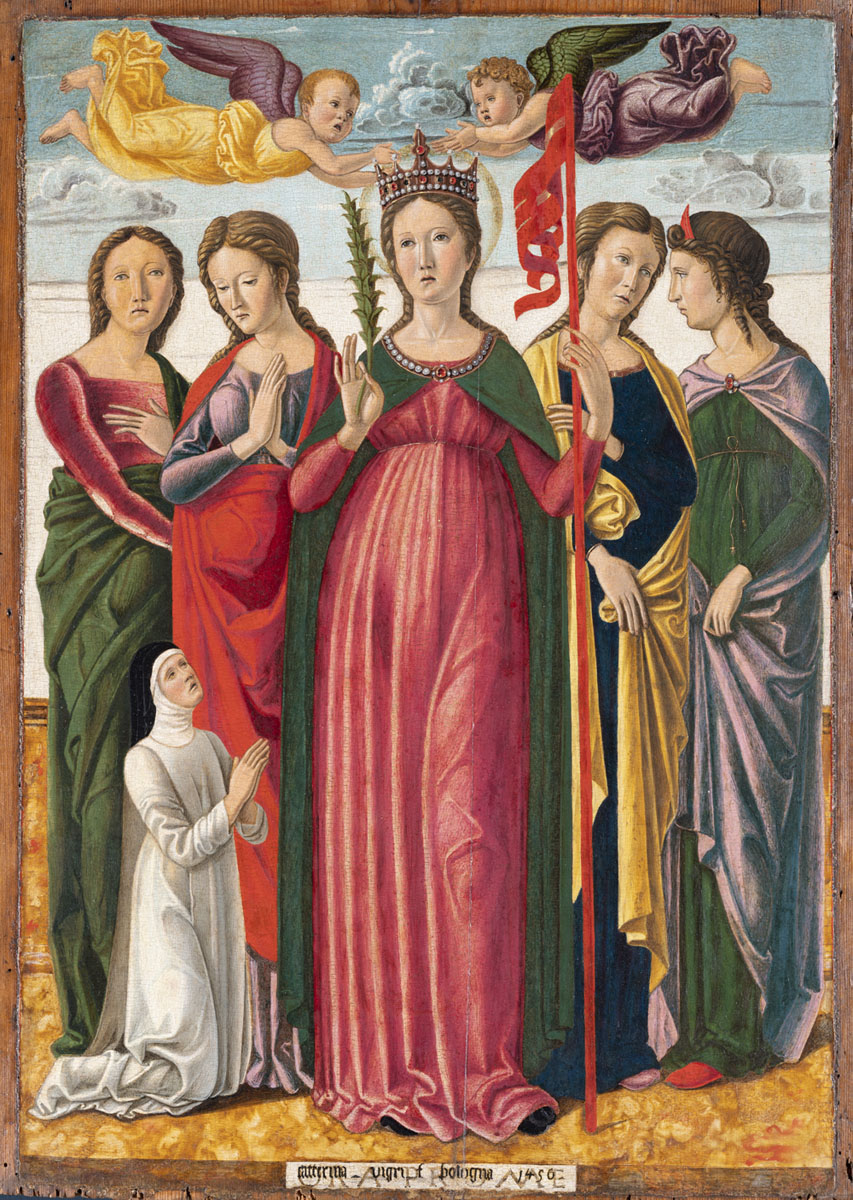
Saint Ursula and Four Holy Virgins painted by Catherine of Bologna (c.1450)

There are no written records about Urška's life; her story survives through oral tradition. She was born in 1457 in a Slovenian family in Češnjica in the Upper Selca Valley. Her mother and father were serf farmers. She had had a brother, Jožko, five years her senior. She was given the name Urška, one of Slovenian versions of name Ursula. Her patron saint was Saint Ursula. In 1458, the Turks invaded Slovenian lands, plundering and devastating her native village. Her mother, a poor farmer, was killed, her six-year-old brother Jožko was abducted, and their home was burned down. Her father managed to escape with one-year-old Urška, and they relocated to an isolated farm by the Sora River in Davča, far from their former home. Her father died before 1478. Villagers from Davča referred to the farmer Urška as Urška Dolinarka (Urška from the Valley) because she was born in the Upper Selca Valley.

== Heroism ==
In 1478, the Turks invaded the Selca Valley again. A smaller group advanced towards Davča. Aware of the dangers women and girls faced under the Turks, Urška rallied her fellow villagers, both women and men, to defend themselves. The narrow gorge in the area provided an excellent natural defense. After a prolonged battle, they managed to drive the Turks away.Among the wounded Turks left in the gorge was a janissary named Jufus. Urška noticed a birthmark on his wrist, identical to her own, and recognized him as her brother Jožko. Jožko returned to the Christian faith and remained in the Selca Valley. He carved a cross into the rock at the site where Urška and the villagers defeated the Turkish forces. This cross still marks the furthest point the Turks reached.

== In literature ==
Urška Dolinarka's story has inspired various literary and historical works. In 1861, priest and poet France Svetličič published the epic poem "Turški križ" (The Turkish Cross) in Slovenski glasnik, based on the folk tale about her. The most renowned literary work about her is the play Turški križ (The Turkish Cross) by the priest, politician and writer Janez Evangelist Krek, a native of the Selca Valley. It premiered in 1909 and was published in 1910. The main character, Uršula, is clearly modeled after Urška Dolinarka and bears a strong resemblance to Saint Joan, Maid of Orleans.

== Other literature ==
Dramatic play Turški križ (Turkish Cross) by Janez Evangelist Krek/
