= Željeznica =

Željeznica may refer to:

- Željeznica (Bosna), a river in Bosnia and Herzegovina, tributary of Bosna River
- Željeznica (Fojnička River), alternative name Gvožđanka, a river in Bosnia and Herzegovina, source tributary of Fojnička River
- Željeznica (Montenegro), a river in Montenegro
- Željeznica, Croatia, a village near Ivanec, Croatia
