= Železniki =

- Town
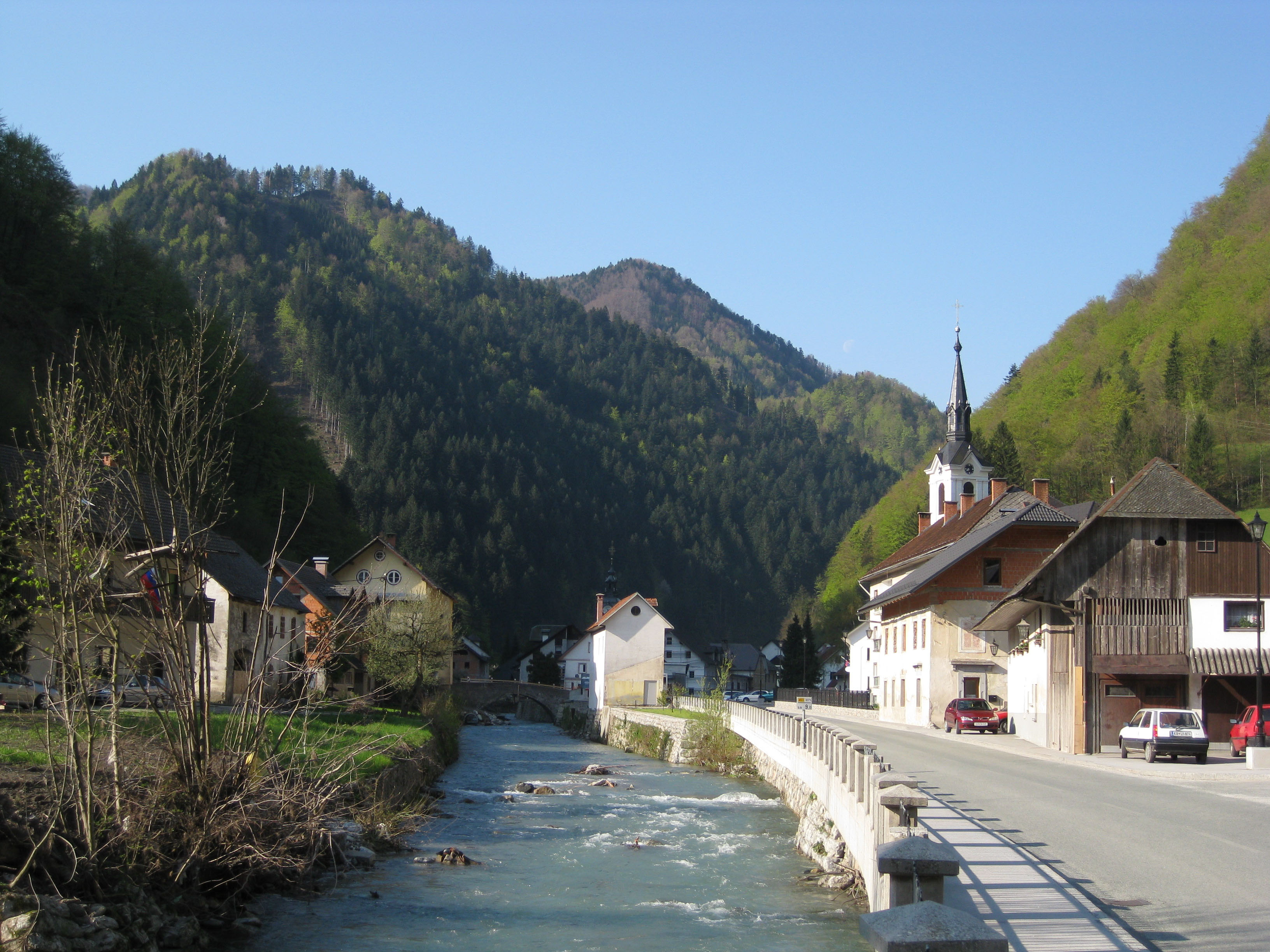
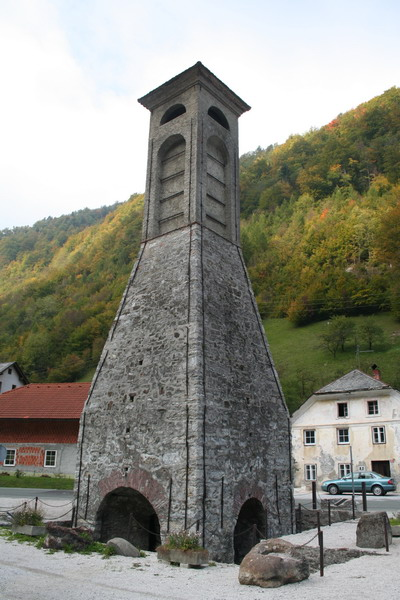
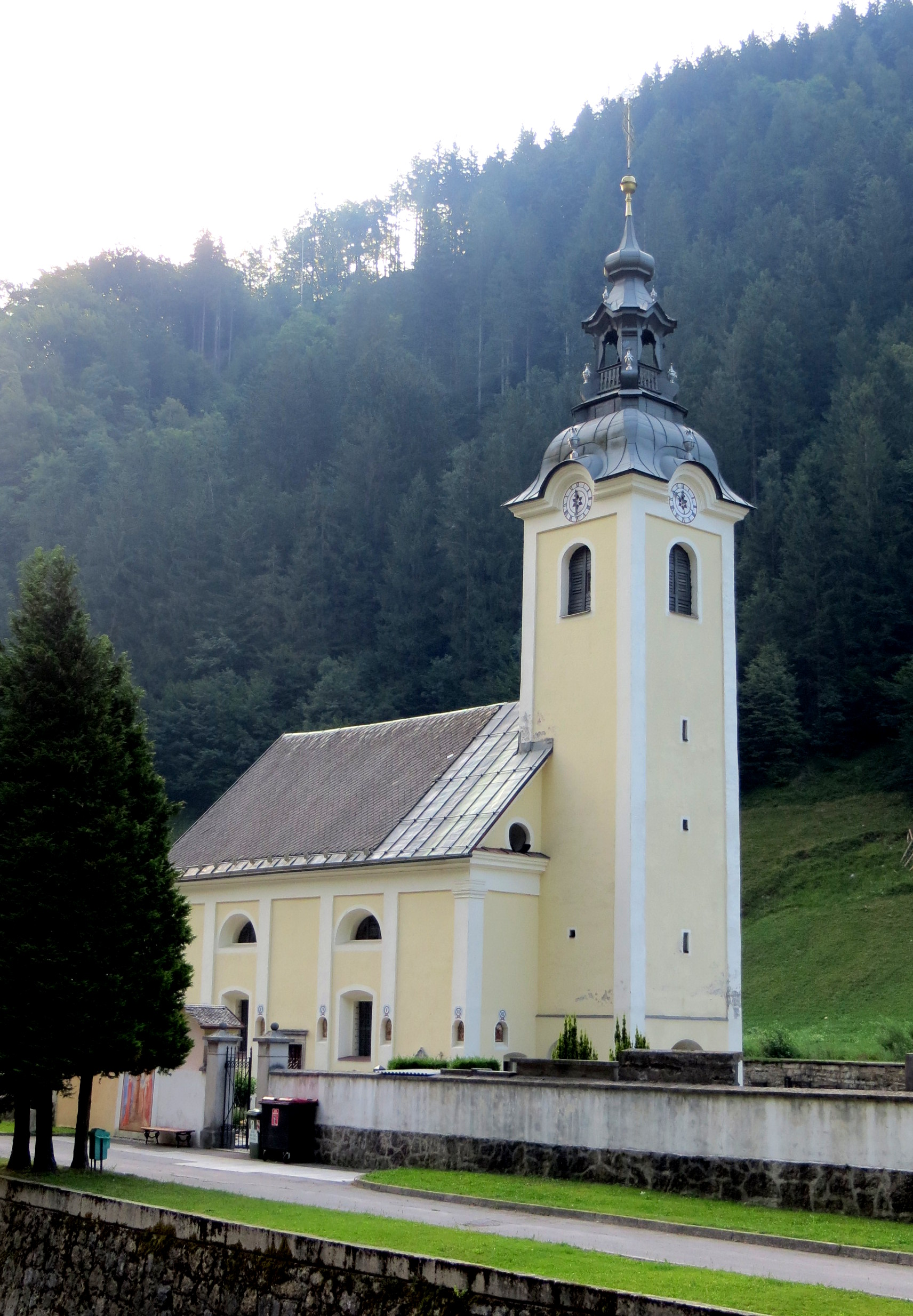
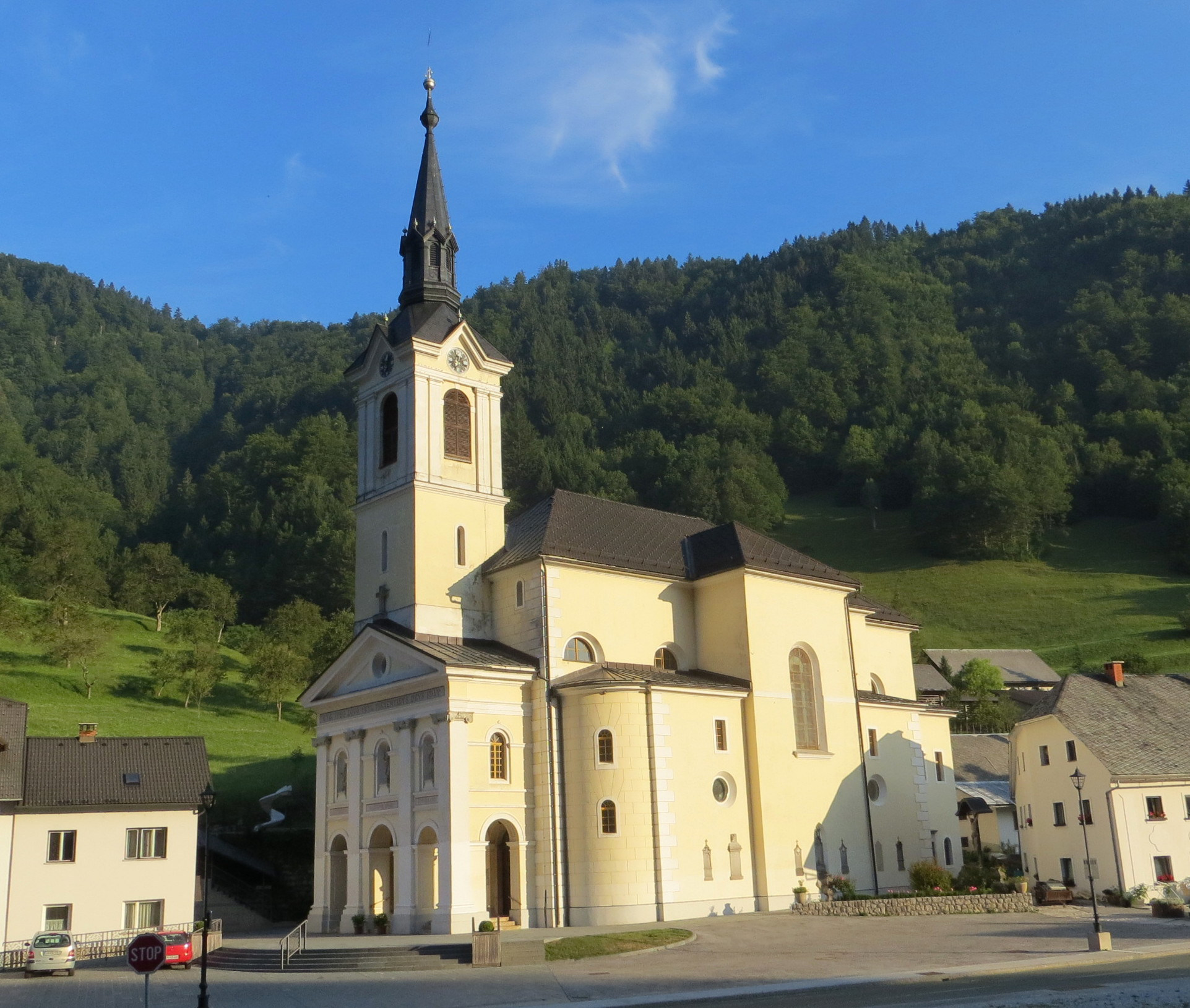
- From top, left to right: Selca Sora River in Železniki, Reconstructed blast furnace, St. Francis's Church, St. Anthony's Church

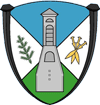
- Coat of arms

- Location in Slovenia
- Coordinates: 46°13′5.67″N 14°9′33.1″E
- Country: Slovenia
- Traditional Region: Upper Carniola
- Statistical region: Upper Carniola
- Municipality: Železniki
- Elevation: 450 m (1,480 ft)

Population (2012)
  - Total: 3,069

Železniki (pronounced [ʒɛˈléːzniki]; German: Eisnern) is a small town in Slovenia. It is the seat of the Municipality of Železniki and it is the economic centre and the largest settlement in the Selca Valley. It includes the hamlets and neighborhoods of Jesenovec, Gorenji Konec (in older sources also Zgornji Železniki, German: Obereisnern), Ovčja Vas (Slovene: Ovčja vas), Trnje (in older sources also Srednji Železniki, German: Mittereisnern), Racovnik (in older sources also Spodnji Železniki, German: Untereisnern), Škovine, Na Kresu, Češnjica, Log, and Tolar.

== Industry ==
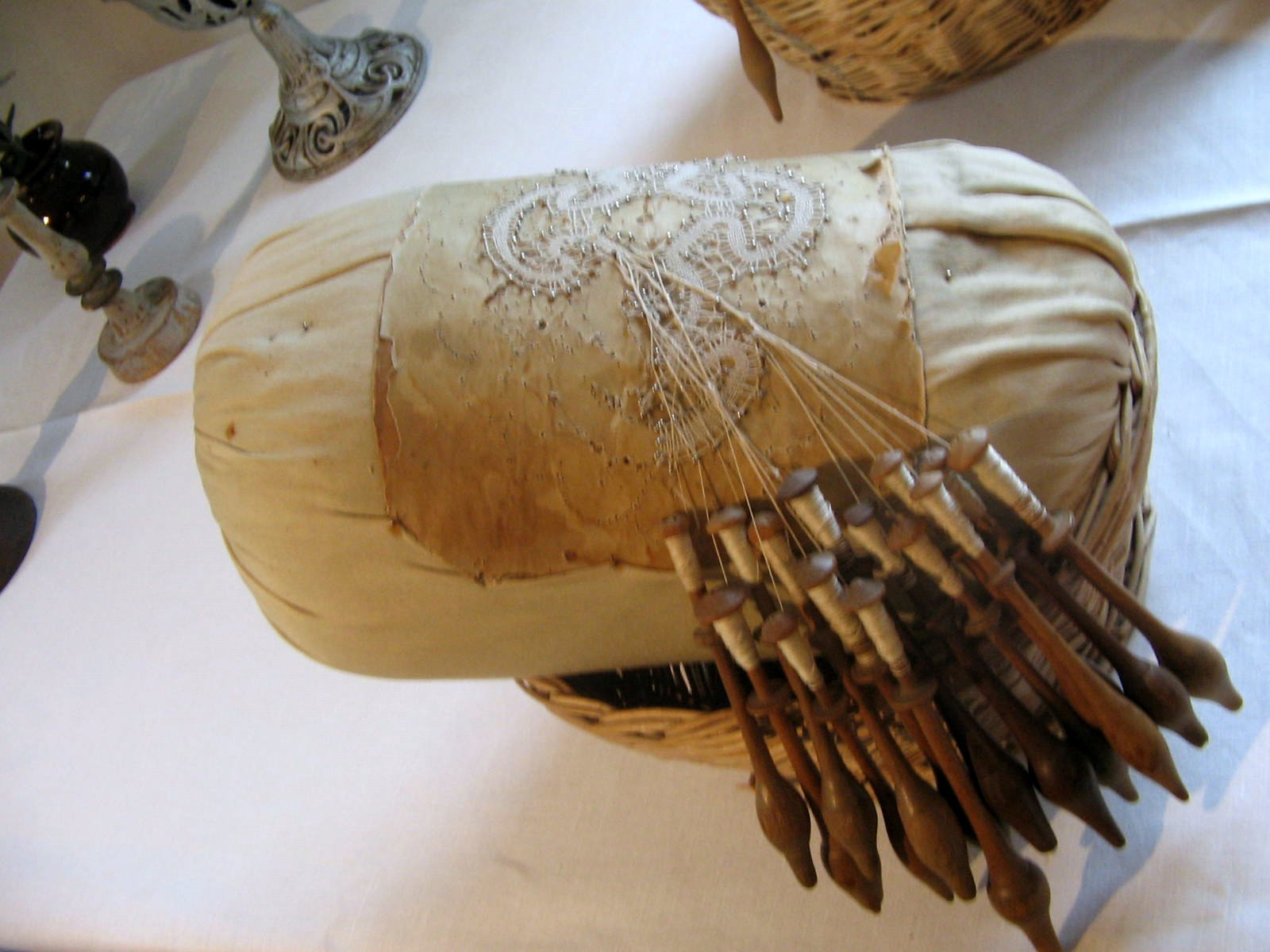
Bobbin lace

Železniki used to be known for iron smelting, and its name in Slovene indicates a relation to ironworks. The first furnace was mentioned in 1422, and the original furnace was replaced in 1826 by a blast furnace that ceased operating in about 1902. The town is known for bobbin lace-making and has a lace-making school where the tradition is taught. The first teacher there was Marija Reven. Certain relatively large factories are based in Železniki, including Alples, Domel and Niko. These firms sponsor local sports teams such as the Alples handball team, football team NK Železniki, and the Galaks floorball team.

The architecture of the old part of the settlement is mainly from the 17th century. The main attraction in the town is its museum with exhibits related to ironworking and other local activities. Part of the original smelting furnace is preserved outside the museum and also appears in the coat of arms of the town.

== Demographics ==
Historical population
Year	1948	1953	1961	1971	1981	1991	2002	2011	2021
Pop.	1,361	1,507	1,840	2,235	2,893	3,138	3,156	3,075	2,933
±%	—	+10.7%	+22.1%	+21.5%	+29.4%	+8.5%	+0.6%	−2.6%	−4.6%
Population size may be affected by changes in administrative divisions.

== Churches ==
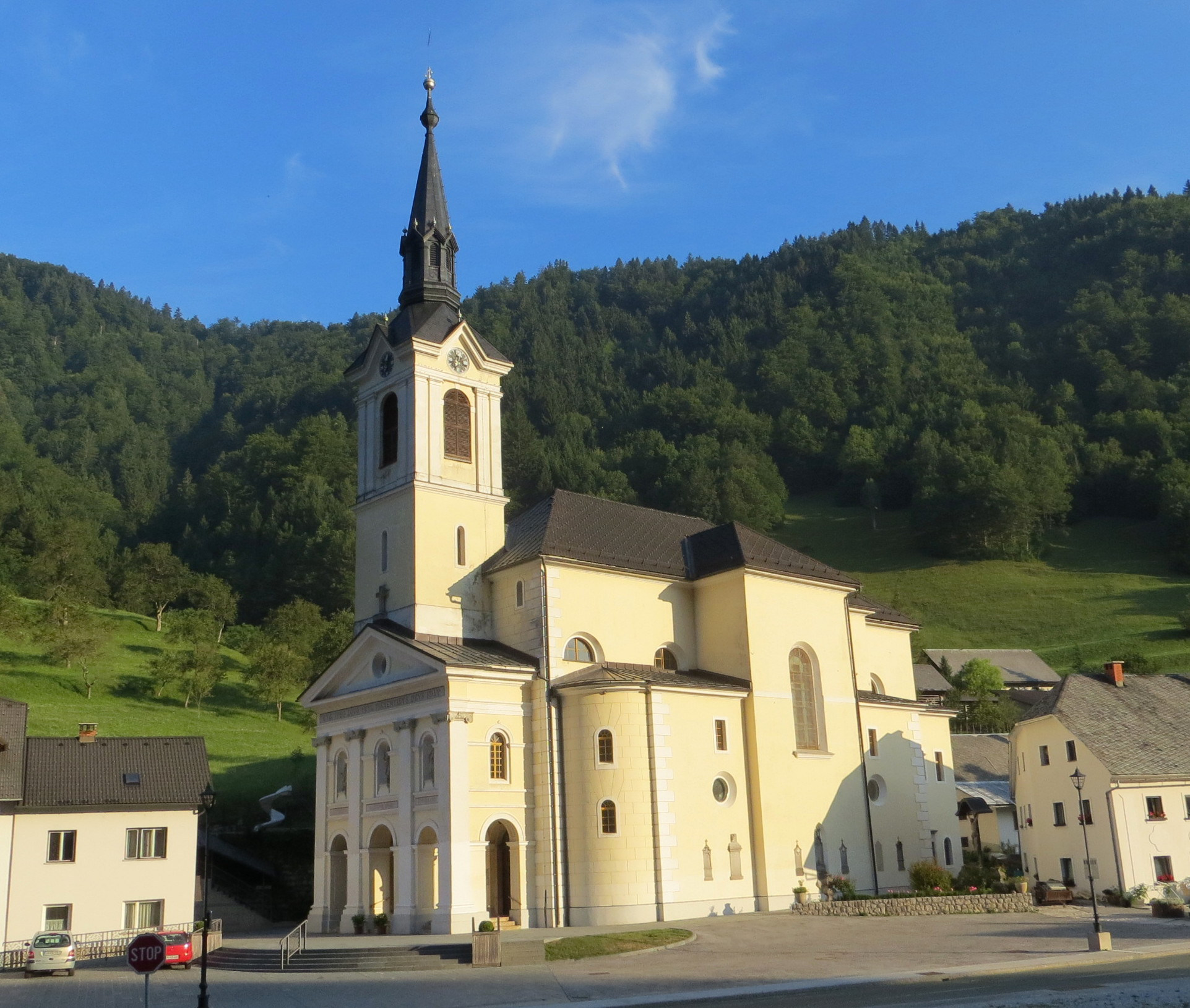
Saint Anthony's Church

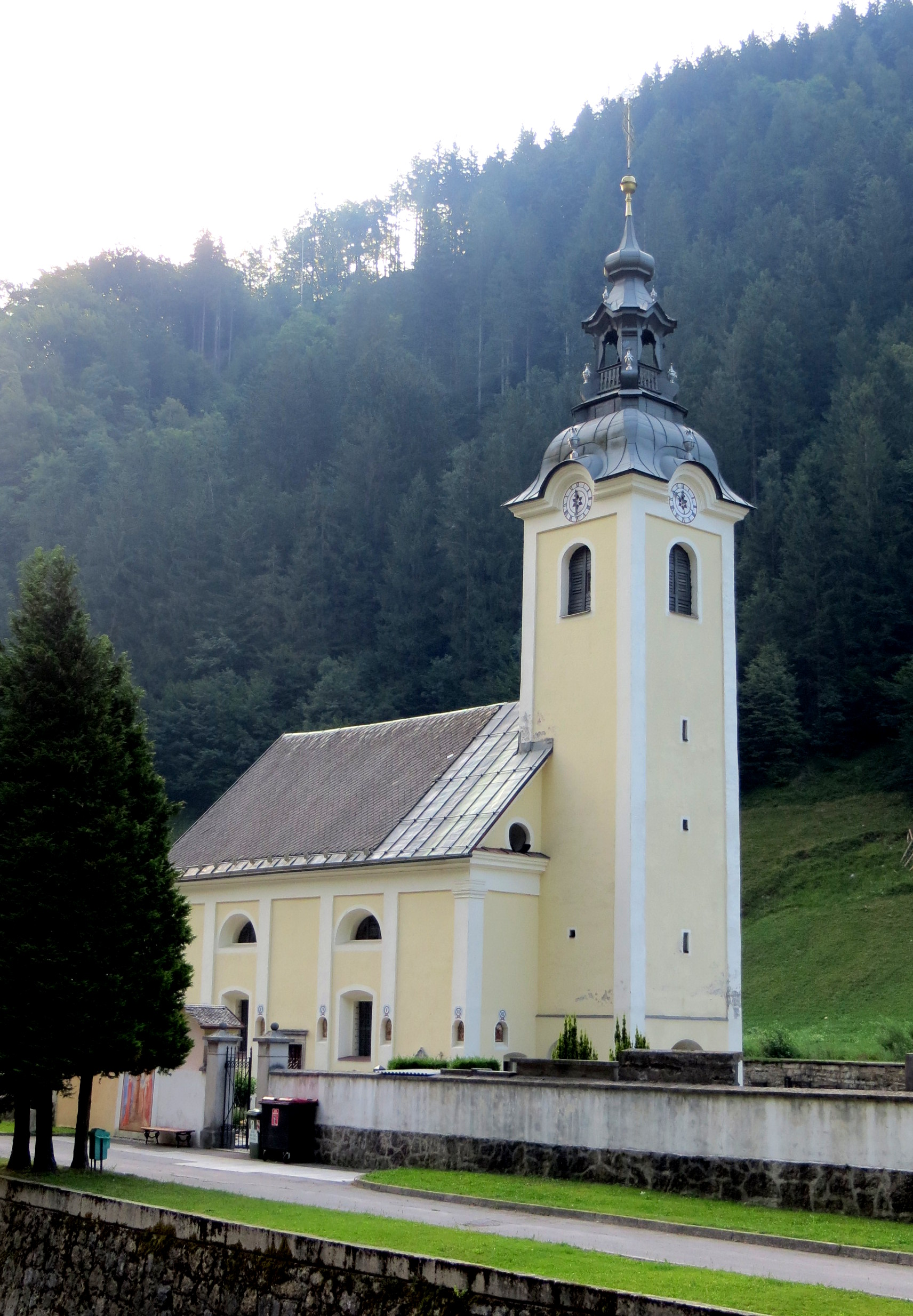
Saint Francis Xavier Church

The parish church in Železniki is dedicated to Saint Anthony and stands in Trnje on the left bank of the Selca Sora River. It was built between 1872 and 1874 in the Renaissance Revival style at the site of an earlier church that burned down in 1822. The church was built by Franc Faleschini based on a design by Štefan Šubic. The bell tower was damaged by fire in 1944, but was repaired in 1997. The church contains works by Janez Wolf, Janez Gosar Sr., and Ludovik Grilc. Saint Francis Xavier Church stands on the opposite side of the river in Log. It was built in 1707 in the Baroque style, with a barrel-vaulted chancel and nave. The chancel vault and arch were painted by Štefan Šubic in 1857. The cemetery around the church was established in the early 19th century.

== Notable people ==
Notable people that were born or lived in Železniki include the following:

- Antonija Thaler (1914–2014), bobbin lace maker, draughtswoman, and designer
