= Lost Lansdale Series =

Series of four books by Joe R. Lansdale

The Lost Lansdale Series is a series of four books by Joe R. Lansdale.

== Waltz of Shadows (Series #1) ==
Waltz of Shadows
- Cover art by Mark A. Nelson
- Author: Joe R. Lansdale
- Cover artist: Mark A. Nelson
- Language: English
- Publisher: Subterranean Press
- Publication date: 1999
- Publication place: United States
- Media type: Print - Limited edition Hardcover, Trade Hardcover
- Pages: 271
- ISBN: 1-892284-29-4
- Preceded by: Freezer Burn (1999)
- Followed by: Something Lumber This Way Comes (1999)

Waltz of Shadows: a novel of suspense is a crime/mystery novel written by American author Joe R. Lansdale. It is the first volume in the Lost Lansdale series of books published by Subterranean Press. This book was printed as both a limited edition and a trade hardcover.

=== Plot summary ===
Hank and Beverly Small own a chain of video stores in the East Texas town of Imperial City. Hank has a black sheep nephew named Bill who often calls his uncle when he needs money or is in trouble. One morning Bill calls and Hank figures it's just another plea for money or he's in trouble with the cops. Hank figures it's no big deal. He has never been so wrong. Bill has fallen into trouble with a pair of vicious, sadistic murderers and the local police cannot be trusted. So Hank looks up his long estranged older brother Arnold for help. But the two killers, Fat Boy and Snake, are already onto them and the Smalls are framed for having child pornography and led down a path of brutal murder and sexual assault. This novel portrays scenes of brutality that are common in a Joe R. Lansdale story. For a while there doesn't seem to be any way the protagonists will be able to survive the likes of Fat Boy and Snake.

== Something Lumber This Way Comes (Series #2) ==
Something Lumber This Way Comes
- Author: Joe R. Lansdale
- Illustrator: Doug Potter
- Cover artist: Doug Potter
- Language: English
- Genre: Novel
- Publisher: Subterranean Press
- Publication date: October 1999
- Publication place: United States
- Media type: Print Limited edition
- Pages: 80
- ISBN: 1-892284-33-2
- Preceded by: Waltz of Shadows (1999)
- Followed by: The Big Blow (2000)

Something Lumber This Way Comes is a children's book written by American author Joe R. Lansdale. It is volume 2 of the lost Lansdale series of books published by Subterranean Press. The title is inspired by Ray Bradbury's classic novel Something Wicked This Way Comes. The story is inspired by Lansdale's horror novel The Nightrunners.

This book was published as both a limited and lettered edition. This book was nominated for a Bram Stoker Award in the "Work for Younger Readers" category in 1999.

=== Plot summary ===
One day young Jimmy notices a creepy looking old house that seemed to suddenly appear on his block of well–manicured lawns and maintained homes. The house really gives him the creeps, but his parents seem oblivious to its even being there. So he and his friend Bob set out to find out what they can about the house and its seemingly evil presence.

== Blood Dance (Series #3) ==
Blood Dance
- Author: Joe R. Lansdale
- Illustrator: Mark A. Nelson
- Cover artist: Mark A. Nelson
- Language: English
- Genre: Novel
- Publisher: Subterranean Press
- Publication date: March 2000
- Publication place: United States
- Media type: Print Limited edition
- Pages: 203
- ISBN: 1-892284-66-9

Blood Dance is a novel of Western fiction written by American author Joe R. Lansdale. It is volume 3 of the Lost Lansdale series of books published by Subterranean Press. At the time of publication in March 2000, the publisher stipulated that this would be the only edition of this book the author would ever allow. It was published in a limited hardback edition of 1,000 signed/numbered copies and 12 to 18 signed/lettered editions in traycase. An original piece of Mark A. Nelson's art was to be bound into each custom-made traycase.

== For a Few Stories More (Series #4) ==
For a Few Stories More
- Author: Joe R. Lansdale
- Cover artist: Mark A. Nelson
- Language: English
- Genre: Short story collection
- Publisher: Subterranean Press
- Publication date: 2002
- Publication place: United States
- Media type: Print hardcover, limited edition
- Pages: 326
- ISBN: 1-931081-30-1
- Preceded by: High Cotton (2000)
- Followed by: A Little Green Book of Monster Stories (2003)

For a Few Stories More is a limited edition collection of extremely rare stories by American author Joe R. Lansdale, which he decided to publish to prove that not everything he wrote was as great as what is widely available. The book was published as Volume 4 of Subterranean Press's Lost Lansdale series in 2002. This book has long since sold out.

The title is a pun, referring to Sergio Leone's film For a Few Dollars More. Previously Lansdale anthologies were published under the titles A Fist Full of Stories (and Articles) and The Good, The Bad, and the Indifferent, also referring to movies by the Italian director.

As limited as the original printing was (1000 copies) there was an even more limited (lettered, 52 copies) edition which included the otherwise unpublished young-adult novel Shadow Time, about vampires.

The collection includes:

Unpublished stories

- "Depression"
- "A Halloween Story" (written under the pseudonym Josephine Richards)
- "Jailbait" (with Bill Crider)
- "A Little Halloween Talk" (written under the pseudonym Richard Dale)
- "The Living Room God: A Play"
- "Looters"
- "Loving Care" (written under the pseudonym Richard Dale)
- "Metadorquesis"
- "My Kind of Luck"
- "Partners" (with Scott A. Cupp)
- "Sweet Revenge" (written under the pseudonym Richard Dale)
- "Something Rides with the Western Star"
- "Untitled Film Proposal"
- "White Face" (with Ardath F. Mayhar)
- The Long Fall, an unpublished Ray Slater private eye novel.

Obscurities

- "For Just One Hour" (previously published in Triple Feature)
- "In the Night"
- "Mayfly" (published in Bloodrake, 1982)
- "The Original Lengueenies" (previously published in Triple Feature)
- "The Panther Stalks" (with Ardath F. Mayhar; originally published in Weirdbook #26, 1991)
- "Red is the Color of Blood and Roses"
- "A Right to Be Dead" (with Bill Crider; originally published in Black Cat Mystery Magazine #3, 1981)
- "This Little Piggy" (with Dan Lowry; originally published in Skullduggery, 1981)
