= The God of the Razor =

2007 collection of short stories by Joe R. Lansdale

- Author: Joe R. Lansdale
- Cover artist: Timothy Truman
- Language: English
- Genre: Horror, short story collection
- Publisher: Subterranean Press
- Publication date: 2007
- Publication place: United States
- Media type: Print hardcover, limited edition
- Pages: 295
- ISBN: 978-1-59606-115-6
- Preceded by: The King and Other Stories (2005)
- Followed by: The Shadows, Kith and Kin (2007)

The God of the Razor is a collection of short stories by American writer Joe R. Lansdale. It also contains the early Lansdale novel The Nightrunners. It was published by Subterranean Press in 2007. Interior illustrations are by artist Glenn Chadborne. Cover artist is Timothy Truman. This book was published as a limited edition and a deluxe lettered edition. Both editions have long sold out.

The character of the God Of the Razor was the basis for the comic book limited series Blood and Shadows published by DC Vertigo in 1996 with art by Mark Nelson. The character also appeared in the Batman story Subway Jack written by Lansdale for the 1989 prose collection The Further Adventures of Batman.

== Table of contents ==
- The Nightrunners
- God of the Razor
- Not From Detroit
- King of Shadows
- Shaggy House
- Incident On and Off a Mountain Road
- Janet Finds the Razor
