= Domel (company) =

Domel is a Slovenian electric motor manufacturer. The company was founded in 1946, its headquarters and production facilities are in Železniki, Slovenia. Domel is one of the largest European developers and manufacturers of vacuum motors, suction units, brushless motors, automotive components and various other tools. It also produces components for home appliance, air conditioning, medicine, automotive appliances and alternative energy sources. Subsidiaries are Tehtnica and Domel Energija. It has offices in Germany, UK, Sweden, Iran, United States, Canada, Australia and Russia.
