= Zelezny =

Zelezny, Železný, Zhelezny or Zheleznyi may refer to:

== People ==
- Helen Zelezny-Scholz or Zelezny (1882–1974), Czech-born sculptor
- Jan Železný (born 1966), Czech javelin thrower
- Vladimír Železný (born 1945), Czech businessman and politician

== Other uses ==
- 9224 Železný, a minor planet

== See also ==
- Železný Brod, a town in the Czech Republic
- Gus-Zhelezny, an urban locality in Ryazan Oblast, Russia
- Zelazny
