= The Long Ones =

1999 compilation of novellas by Joe R. Lansdale

The Long Ones is a rare compilation of novellas by American writer Joe R. Lansdale, which are too long to be "short stories", but too short to be "novels". It was apparently only printed once, in hardcover form, in 1999.

== Contents ==
- Bubba Ho-Tep (nominated for Bram Stoker Award) {originally published in The King Is Dead, ed. Paul M. Sammon (1994)}
- The Events Concerning a Nude Fold-Out Found in a Harlequin Romance (winner of Bram Stoker Award) {originally published in Dark at Heart, ed. Joe & Karen Lansdale (1992) }
- On the Far Side of the Cadillac Desert With Dead Folks (winner of the Bram Stoker Award) {originally published in Book of the Dead, ed. John M. Skipp & Craig Spector (1989)}
- The Steam Man of the Prairie and the Dark Rider Get Down: A Dime Novel {first publication}
- Afterword

At the time, The Steam Man was exclusive to this collection, but it has been subsequently re-published in Mad Dog Summer as well as the short-story anthology Steampunk.
