= Železná (Beroun District) =

- Municipality
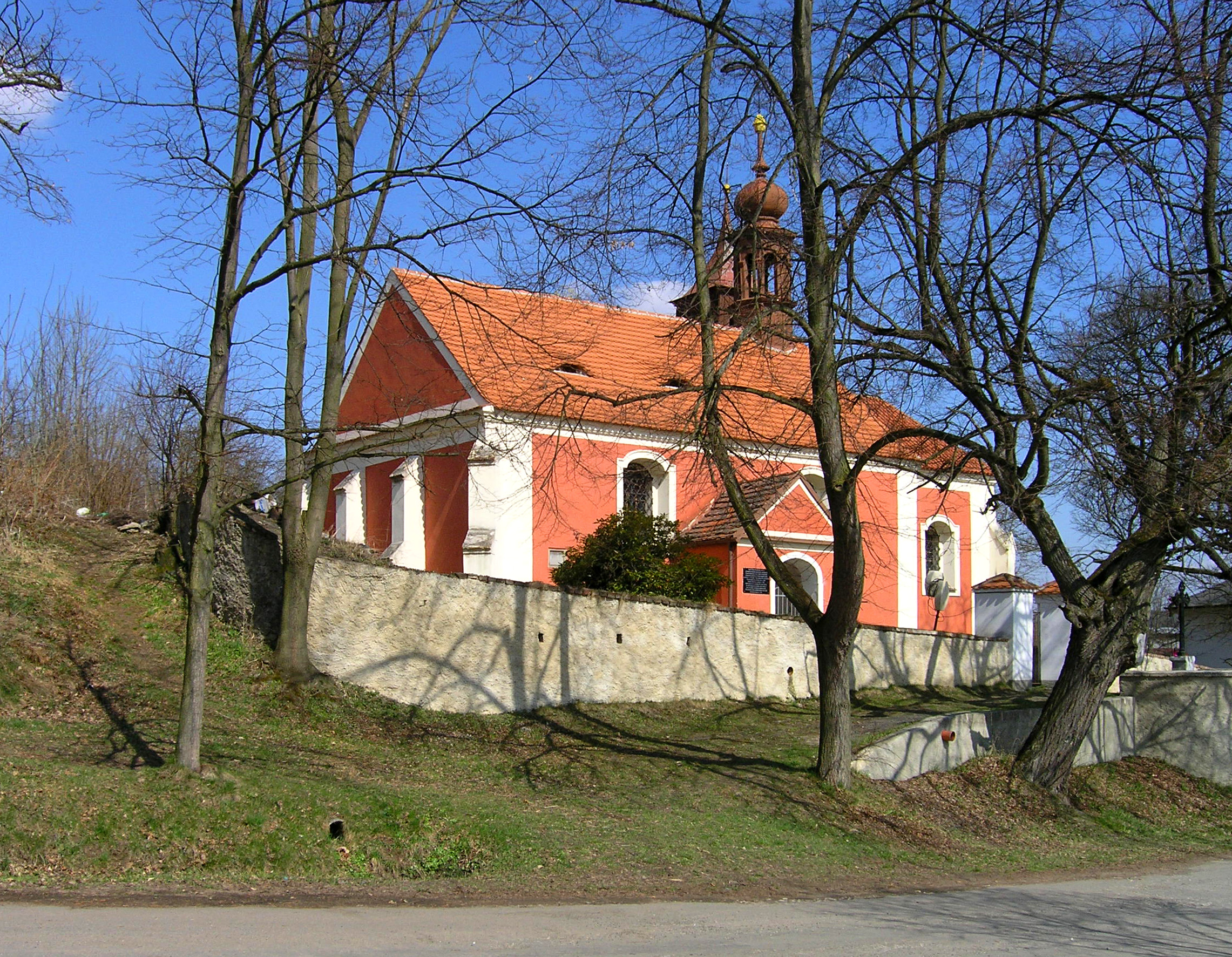
- Church of the Assumption of the Virgin Mary

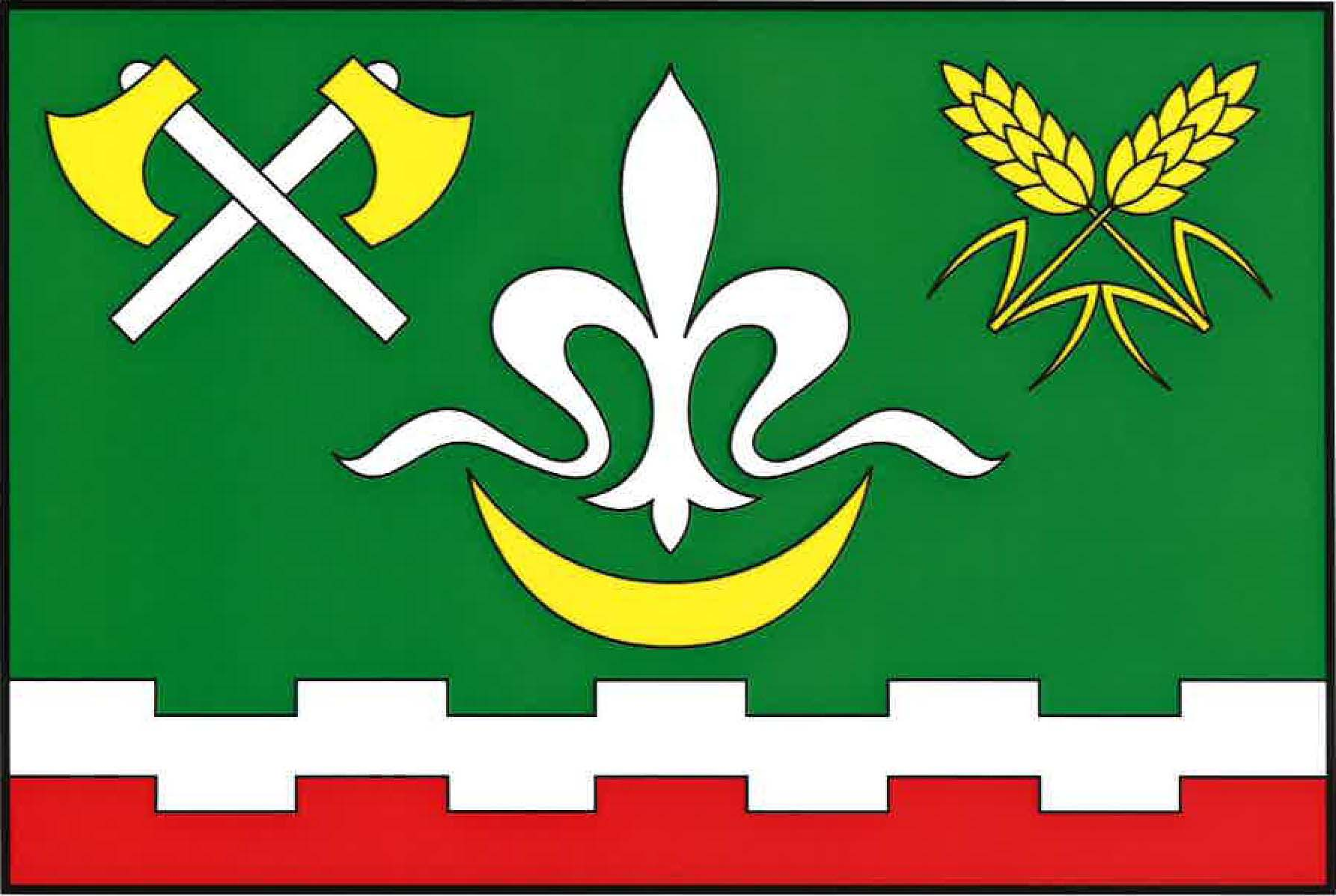
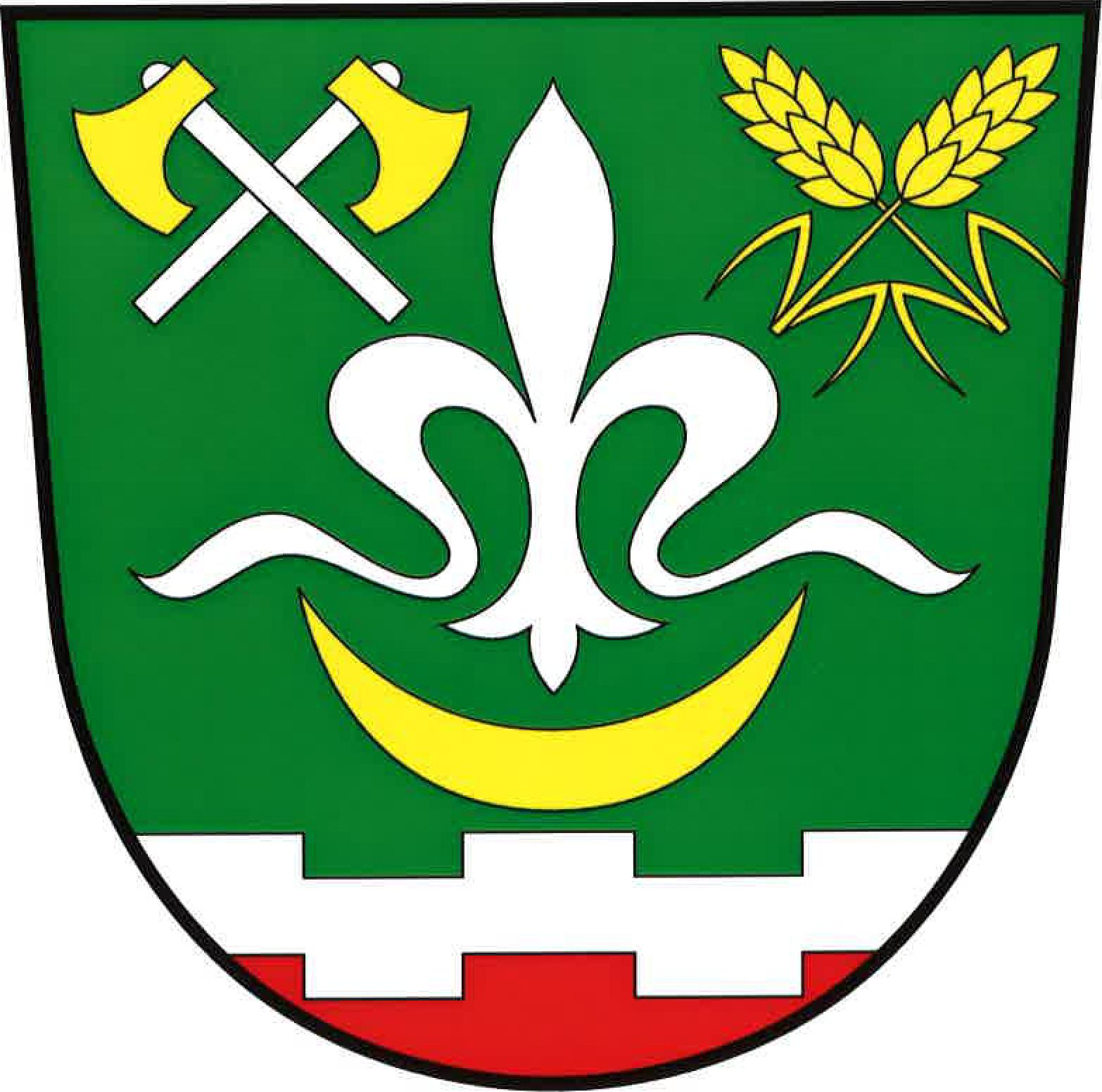
- Flag Coat of arms

- Location in the Czech Republic
- Coordinates: 50°0′35″N 14°5′28″E
- Country: Czech Republic
- Region: Central Bohemian
- District: Beroun
- First mentioned: 1292

Area
  - Total: 4.01 km^{2} (1.55 sq mi)
- Elevation: 398 m (1,306 ft)

Population (2026-01-01)
  - Total: 329
  - Density: 82.0/km^{2} (212/sq mi)
- Time zone: UTC+1 (CET)
  - Summer (DST): UTC+2 (CEST)
- Postal code: 266 01
- Website: www.obec-zelezna.cz

Železná is a municipality and village in Beroun District in the Central Bohemian Region of the Czech Republic. It has about 300 inhabitants.

== Demographics ==
Historical population
Year	Pop.	±%
1869	400	—
1880	435	+8.7%
1890	402	−7.6%
1900	385	−4.2%
1910	413	+7.3%
1921	365	−11.6%
1930	329	−9.9%
1950	266	−19.1%
1961	244	−8.3%
1970	214	−12.3%
1980	251	+17.3%
1991	215	−14.3%
2001	214	−0.5%
2011	281	+31.3%
2021	306	+8.9%
Source: Censuses
