= Zelazny (surname) =

Zelazny or Żelazny (Polish pronunciation: [ʐɛˈlaznɨ]) is a surname. Notable people with the surname include:

- Erwin Zelazny (born 1991), French footballer
- Eryk Żelazny (born 1943), Polish runner
- Mary Lou Zelazny (born 1956), American painter
- Roger Zelazny (1937–1995), American writer
- Trent Zelazny (born 1976), American author

== See also ==
- Zelezny (disambiguation)
