= Železné =

- Municipality
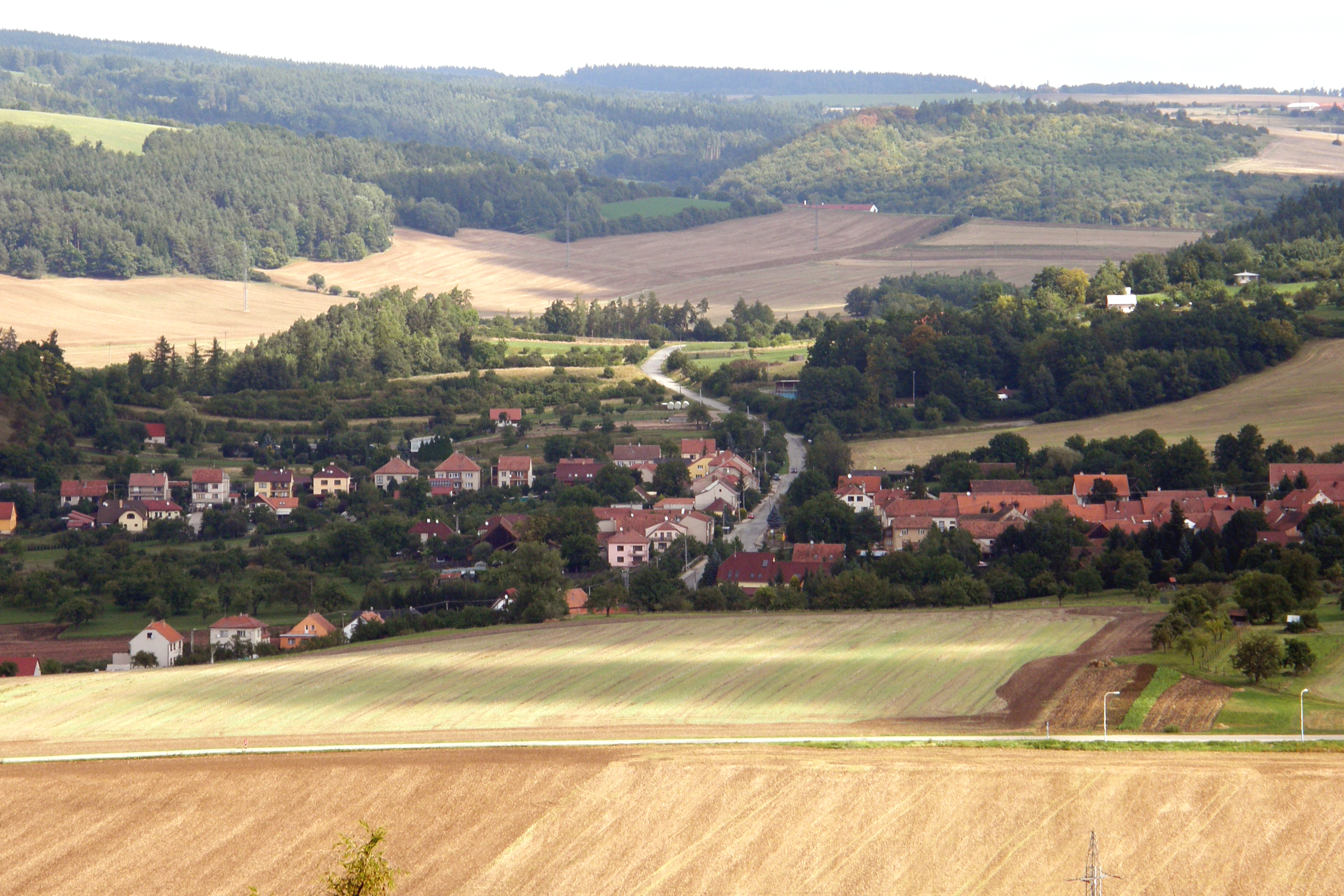
- Panorama of the village

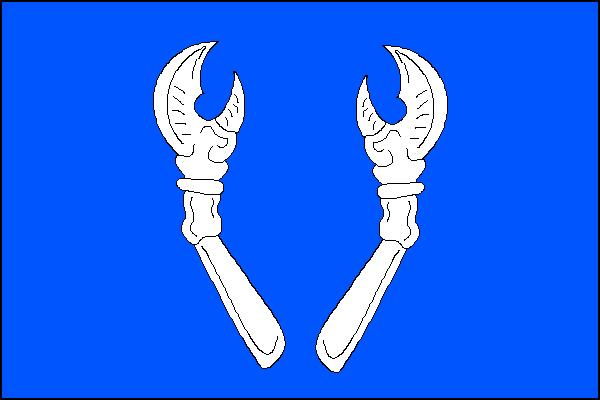
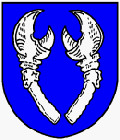
- Flag Coat of arms

- Location in the Czech Republic
- Coordinates: 49°21′35″N 16°27′2″E
- Country: Czech Republic
- Region: South Moravian
- District: Brno-Country
- First mentioned: 1239

Area
  - Total: 2.36 km^{2} (0.91 sq mi)
- Elevation: 320 m (1,050 ft)

Population (2026-01-01)
  - Total: 628
  - Density: 266/km^{2} (689/sq mi)
- Time zone: UTC+1 (CET)
  - Summer (DST): UTC+2 (CEST)
- Postal code: 666 01
- Website: www.zelezne.cz

Železné is a municipality and village in Brno-Country District in the South Moravian Region of the Czech Republic. It has about 600 inhabitants.

Železné lies approximately 22 kilometres (14 mi) north-west of Brno and 167 km (104 mi) south-east of Prague.

== Demographics ==
Historical population
Year	Pop.	±%
1869	248	—
1880	253	+2.0%
1890	258	+2.0%
1900	255	−1.2%
1910	298	+16.9%
1921	327	+9.7%
1930	302	−7.6%
1950	271	−10.3%
1961	290	+7.0%
1970	281	−3.1%
1980	254	−9.6%
1991	266	+4.7%
2001	300	+12.8%
2011	416	+38.7%
2021	509	+22.4%
Source: Censuses
