= Alples =

Slovenian furniture manufacturer

Alples is a furniture manufacturer in Slovenia. It was established in 1955 as Medzadružno lesno industrijsko podjetje Češnjica ("The intercooperative timber industry company Češnjica") and renamed to its current name in 1969. In 2008, it had 305 employees and a revenue of €30 million. In 2017, it had 190 employees.

In 2009, Alples was awarded the Superbrands award.

In 2014, Alples provided the equipment for 3,500 rooms used by the participants of the 2015 European Games in Baku, Azerbaijan.
