= Zeleznik =

Zeleznik may refer to:

== People ==
- Lukáš Železník (born 1990), Czech footballer
- Martin Železník (born 1989), Slovak footballer

== Places ==
- Železnik, Serbia
  - FK Železnik, a football club
- Železník (village), Slovakia
- Żeleźnik, Poland
- Demir Hisar (region), also known as Železnik, a region in North Macedonia

== Other uses ==
- Železník (horse) (1978–2004), Czechoslovak racehorse
