= Željeznica (Montenegro) =

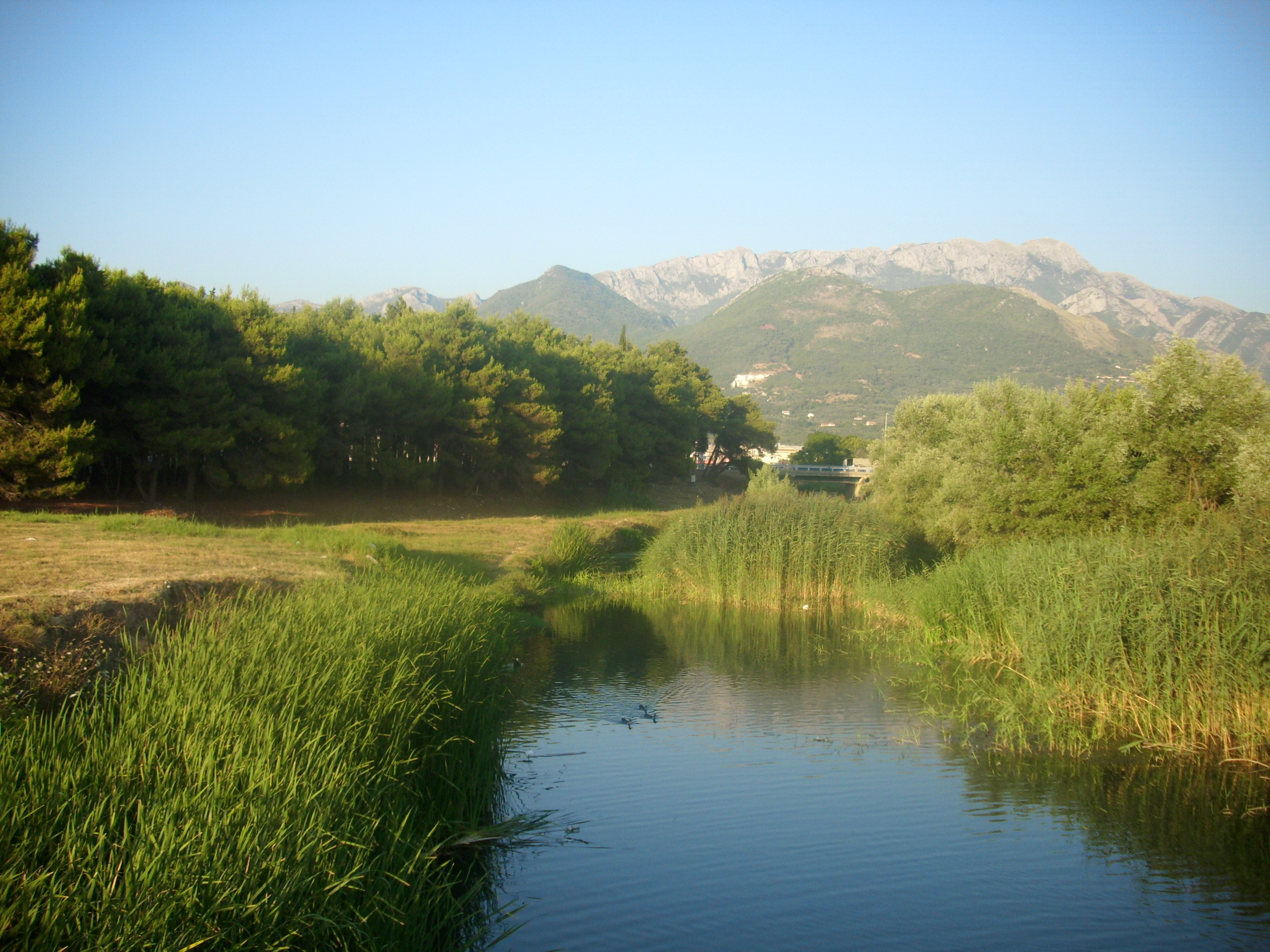

Location
- Country: Montenegro

Physical characteristics
- Mouth
  - location: Adriatic Sea
  - coordinates: 42.1058°N 19.0878°E
- Length: 19.5 km (12.1 mi)

The Željeznica (Serbian Cyrillic: Жељезница) is a river in Bar municipality of Montenegro. In Šušanj it flows into Adriatic Sea. It is a perennial river which has tributaries from mountains Small Rumija and Sutorman. When Montenegrin army captured Bar from the Ottoman Empire in 1878 the Berlin Congress set the border between Austria-Hungary and Kingdom of Montenegro at the river Željeznica.

== Gallery ==
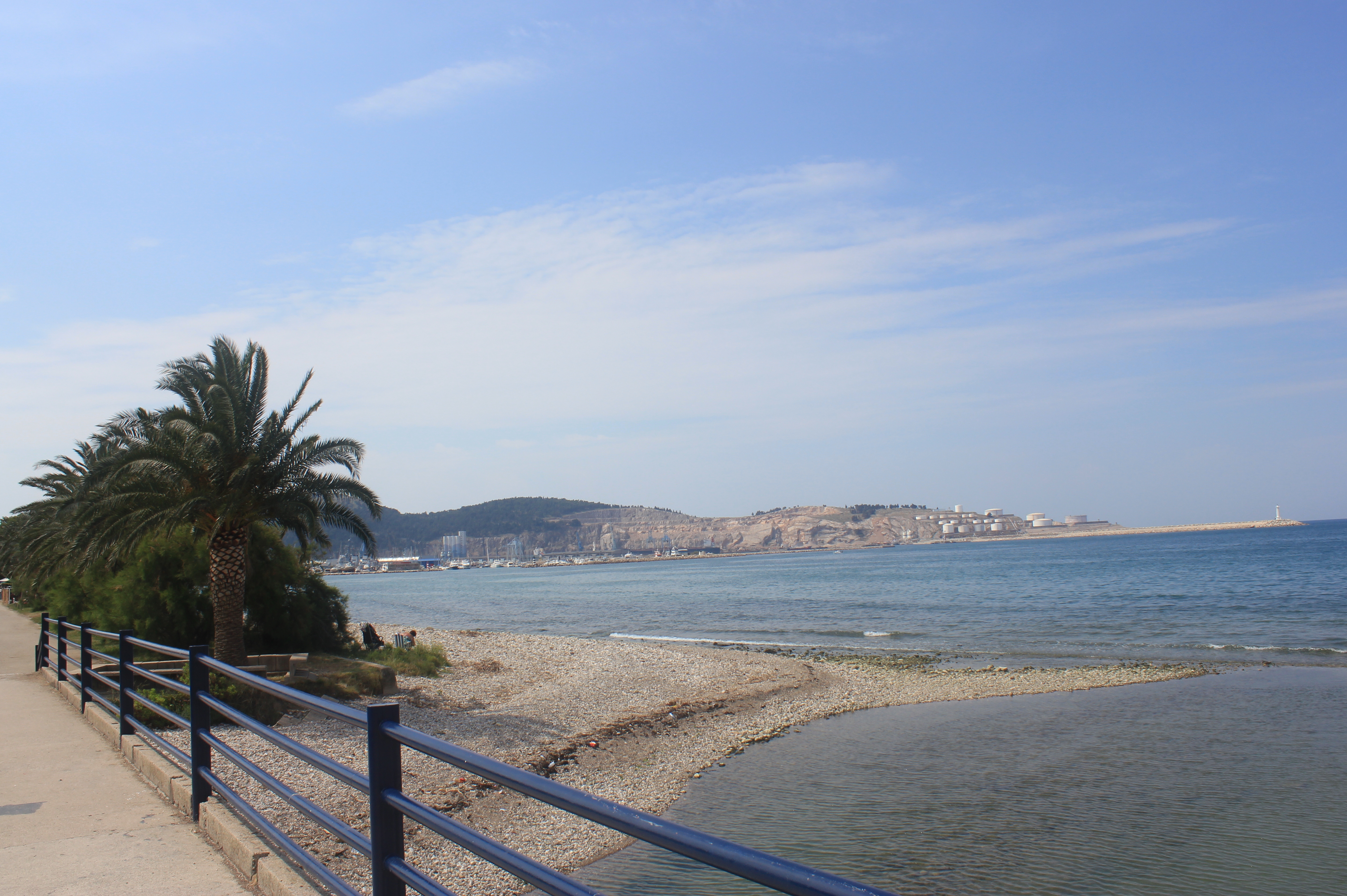
Mouth of the river

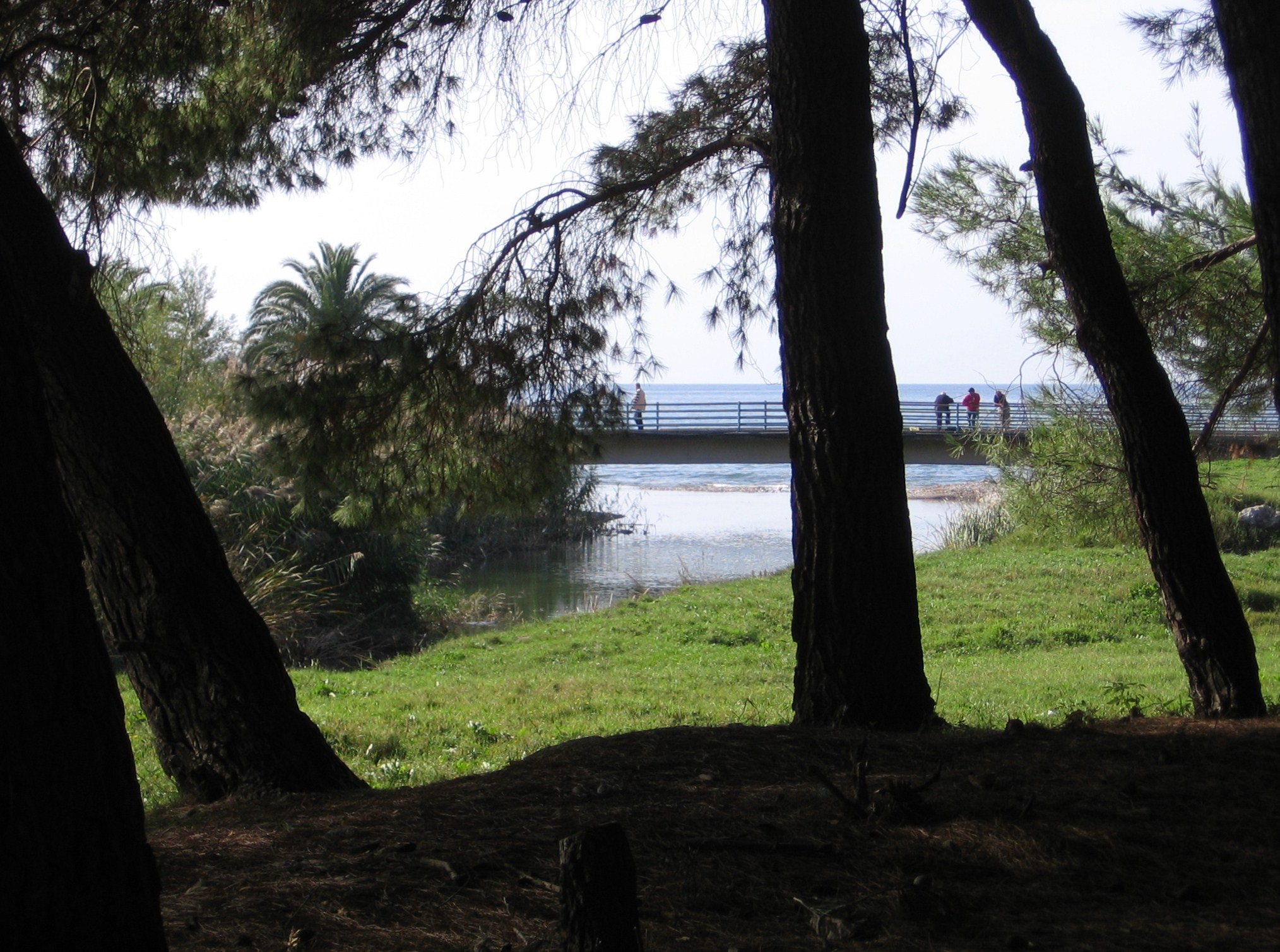
Bridge across the mouth
