= The Good, the Bad, and the Indifferent =

1997 book by Joe R. Lansdale

The Good, The Bad, and the Indifferent
- First edition
- Author: Joe R. Lansdale
- Cover artist: Mark A. Nelson
- Language: English
- Genre: Mystery, short story collection
- Publisher: Subterranean Press
- Publication date: 1997
- Publication place: United States
- Media type: Print hardcover, limited edition
- Pages: 310
- ISBN: 0-9649890-2-6
- Preceded by: A Fist Full of Stories (and Articles) (1996)
- Followed by: Private Eye Action, As You Like It (1998)

The Good, the Bad, and the Indifferent is a collection of short stories by American author Joe R. Lansdale, dating from his early career, published in 1997 as a limited edition by Subterranean Press. Many of the stories were never published before and none of which have ever been collected before. This book has sold out both the numbered and lettered editions.

The title is a play on Sergio Leone's western film The Good, the Bad and the Ugly. It is the part of a trilogy-of-sorts of Lansdale anthologies, preceded by A Fist Full of Stories (and Articles) and followed by For a Few Stories More.

The original, full extended title was The Good, The Bad, and the Indifferent: Early Stories and Commentaries by Joe R. Lansdale.

It contains:

- "All the Little Animals"
- "The Amusement Park"
- "At the Mouth of Time"
- "Cowboy"
- "A Debt to Pay"
- "Devil in the Hole"
- Escape Artist"
- "For Whom the Bell Blows"
- "A Frog-Strangler"
- "From Little Things"
- "Full Report at Ten"
- "Futility"
- "Hang in There"
- "Hickory, Dickory, Dock"
- "The Honeymoon"
- "Huitzilopochtli"
- "The Hungry Locust"
- "The Junkyard" (originally published in Dark Regions #3, 1989)
- "Knock Knock"
- "The Last of the Hopeful"
- "The Man Who Could Not Get Four in a Row"
- "The Man Who Dreamed"
- "Night Drive"
- "One Death, Two Episodes"
- "The Pit of Kundolkan"
- "The Princess" (originally published in Mummy!, ed. Bill Pronzini, 1980)
- "Quack"
- "Saved"
- "Trapped in the Saturday Matinee"
- "The Valley of the Swastika"
- "Walks" (originally published in Cemetery Dance Fall 1997)
- "Waziah" (originally published in Creature!, ed. Bill Pronzini, (1981)
- "Why Does It Cry?"
- "The Yard Man"
