= Pat LoBrutto =

Patrick LoBrutto (born 1948) is an editor, author, and anthologist. He received a World Fantasy Award for editing.

== Early life ==
LoBrutto was born in Brooklyn, NY. His father was an attorney, and he grew up in a home with over many books.

== Publishing career ==
LoBrutto's publishing career began while he was in graduate school, where he was studying urban planning. He took a summer job in the mailroom of Ace Books, which led to a career in publishing. LoBrutto is currently an acquiring editor for Tor Books, a leading publisher of science fiction and fantasy titles.
