= Petrovo Brdo =

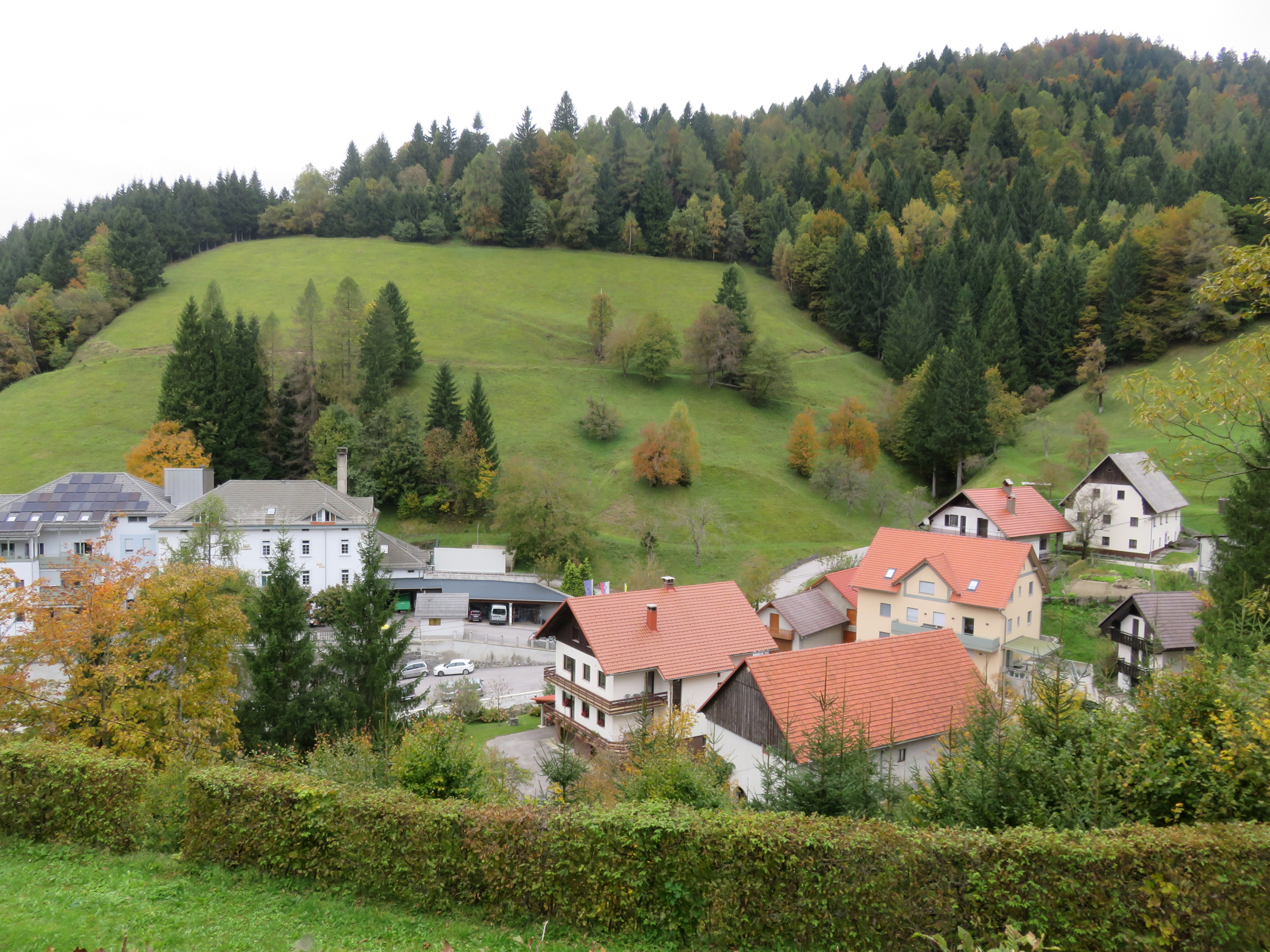

- Location in Slovenia
- Coordinates: 46°12′51.69″N 13°59′55.57″E
- Country: Slovenia
- Traditional region: Slovenian Littoral
- Statistical region: Gorizia
- Municipality: Tolmin

Area
  - Total: 5.91 km^{2} (2.28 sq mi)
- Elevation: 796.6 m (2,614 ft)

Population (2002)
  - Total: 126

Petrovo Brdo (pronounced [ˈpeːtɾɔʋɔ ˈbəɾdɔ]) is a village in the Municipality of Tolmin in Slovenia.

== Geography ==
Petrovo Brdo lies on the road just below a pass that connects the Littoral region and the Upper Carniola region, on the drainage divide between the Bača River, which eventually flows into the Soča, and the Sora River, a tributary of the Sava River.

== History ==
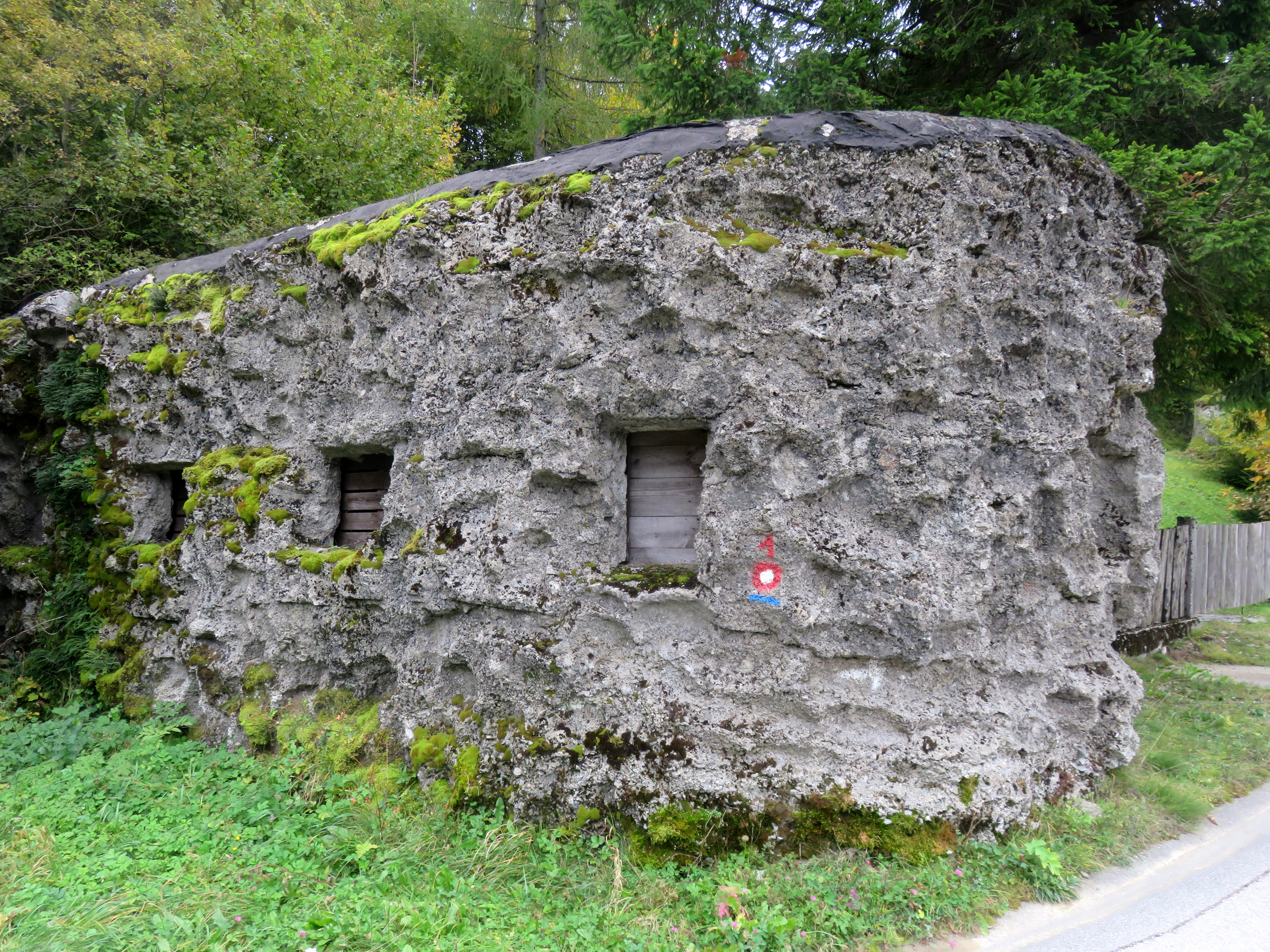
Italian barracks from the interwar period

The road through Petrovo Brdo was an important throughfare in the late Middle Ages. Between the First and Second World Wars, Petrovo Brdo was on the border between the Kingdom of Italy and the Kingdom of Yugoslavia, and large border barracks were built there by the Italians.
