= J. N. Williamson =

American novelist

- Born: April 17, 1932; Indianapolis, Indiana, U.S.
- Died: December 8, 2005 (aged 73); Noblesville, Indiana, U.S.
- Education: Butler University
- Occupations: Novelist; short story writer; editor; journalist
- Writing career
- Language: English
- Genres: Horror, fantasy, science fiction, gothic, dark fantasy

Gerald "Jerry" Neal Williamson (April 17, 1932 – December 8, 2005) was an American horror writer and editor known under the name J. N. Williamson.

Born in Indianapolis, Indiana, Williamson graduated from Shortridge High School. He studied journalism at Butler University. His first novel was published in 1979 and he went on to publish more than 40 novels and 150 short stories. In 2003 he received a lifetime achievement award from the Horror Writers of America.

Williamson edited the critically acclaimed How to Write Tales of Horror, Fantasy & Science Fiction (1987) which covered the themes of such writing and cited the works of such writers as Robert Bloch, Lee Prosser, Richard Matheson, Ray Bradbury, H. P. Lovecraft, August Derleth, William F. Nolan, and Stephen King. Many important writers in the genre contributed to the book. Williamson edited the popular anthology series, Masques. Some of his novels include The Ritual (1979), Playmates (1982), Noonspell (1991), The Haunt (1999), among others.

In 1946, Williamson founded The Illustrious Clients of Indianapolis, a Sherlock Holmes scion society of the Baker Street Irregulars.

Williamson recalled in a 2003 interview that his first work of fiction was a Sherlock Holmes pastiche called "The Terrible Death of Crosby, The Banker".

== Bibliography ==
=== Martin Ruben ===
- The Ritual (1979)
- Premonition (1981)
- Brotherkind (1982)

=== Lamia Zacharias ===
- Death-Coach (1981)
- Death-Angel (1981)
- Death-School (1982)
- Death-Doctor (1982)

=== Novels ===
- The Houngan (1980)
- The Offspring (1980)
- The Tulpa (1980)
- Horror House (1981)
- The Banished (1981)
- Ghost Mansion (1981)
- Queen of Hell (1981)
- The Evil One (1981)
- Playmates (1982)
- Extraterrestrial (1982) (writing as Julian Shock)
- Horror Mansion (1982)
- Nevermore (1983)
- The Hour (1983)
- The Dentist (1983)
- Ghost (1984)
- Babel's Children (1984)
- The Longest Night (1985)
- Ladies of the Longest Night (1985)
- Wards of Armageddon (1986) (with John Maclay)
- Evil Offspring (1987)
- Noonspell (1987)
- Dead to the World (1988)
- They Never Even See Me (1989)
- The Black School (1989)
- Shadows of Death (1989)
- Hell Storm (1990)
- The Night Seasons (1991)
- The Monastery (1992)
- Don't Take Away the Light (1993)
- The Book of Webster's (1993)
- Bloodlines (1994)
- Spree (1998)
- The Haunt (1999)
- Affinity (2001)

=== Collections ===
- The New Devil's Dictionary: Creepy Cliches and Sinister Synonyms (1985)
- The Naked Flesh of Feeling (1991)
- The Fifth Season (1994)
- Frights of Fancy (2000)

=== Anthologies ===
- Masques: All-New Works of Horror and the Supernatural (1984)
- Masques 2 (1987)
- The Best of Masques (1988)
- Masques 3 (1989)
- Flesh Creepers (1990)
- Masques 4 (1991)
- Dark Masques (2001)
- Darker Masques (2002)
- Masques V (2006)

=== Short stories ===
- House Mothers (1984)
- The Gap Nearly Closed Today (1985)
- The Book of Webster's (1986)
- The Night Seasons (1986)
- Privacy Rights (1987)
- Wordsong (1987)
- Fancy That (1988)
- Overnight Pass (1989) (with John Maclay)
- Monstrum (1989)
- Stories for All Seasons (1989)
- The Sudd (1989)
- The Unkindest Cut (1989)
- You'd Better Watch Out (1989)
- The Bridge People (1990)
- Happier Endings (1990)
- Something Extra (1990) (with James Kisner)
- Frankenstein Seen in the Ice of Extinction (1993)
- Goddam Time (1993) (with Scott Fogel)
- Reality Function (1993)
- Beasts in Buildings, Turning 'Round (1995)
- High Concept (1995)
- The Last Link Between Life and Death (1995)
- Origin of a Species (1995)
- Vladimir's Conversions (1995)
- Hildekin and the Big Diehl (1996)
- Two Hands Are Better Than One (1996)
- It Does Not Come Along (1997)

=== Non-fiction ===
- How to Write Tales of Horror, Fantasy and Science Fiction (1987)

=== Anthologies containing stories by J. N. Williamson ===
- Masques: All New Works of Horror and the Supernatural (1984)
- Best of the Horror Show: An Adventure in Terror (1987)
- Masques 2 (1987)
- Whispers VI (1987)
- Fantasy Tales: Vol. 10 - No. 1 (1988)
- Hot Blood: Tales of Provocative Horror (1989)
- Masques 3 (1989)
- Scare Care (1989)
- Urban Horrors (1990)
- The Year's Best Fantasy and Horror Third Annual Collection (1990)
- Hotter Blood: More Tales of Erotic Horror (1991)
- 100 Ghastly Little Ghost Stories (1992)
- Dark Seductions: Tales of Erotic Horror (1993)
- Frankenstein: The Monster Wakes (1993)
- Monsters in Our Midst (1993)
- Predators (1993)
- Celebrity Vampires (1995)
- Night Screams (1995)
- Seeds of Fear (1995)
- Vampire Detectives (1995)
- Werewolves (1995)
- Fear the Fever (1996)
- The Giant Book of Fantasy Tales (1996)
- White House Horrors (1996)
- Terminal Frights (1997)
