= Caitlín R. Kiernan bibliography =

Caitlín R. Kiernan is the author of many science fiction and dark fantasy works, including sixteen novels, many comic books, and more than three hundred published short stories, novellas, and vignettes collected into more than twenty collections. They have also written numerous scientific papers.

== Novels ==
- Silk (1998, Penguin-Putnam; 1999, Gauntlet Press)
- Threshold (2001; Penguin-Putnam)
- The Five of Cups (2003; Subterranean Press)
- Low Red Moon (2003, Penguin-Putnam; 2004, Subterranean Press)
- Murder of Angels (2004; Penguin-Putnam)
- Daughter of Hounds (2007; Penguin-Putnam)
- Beowulf (2007; HarperCollins; novelization of 2007 film)
- The Red Tree (2009; Penguin-Putnam)
- The Drowning Girl: A Memoir (2012, Penguin-Putnam; 2014, Centipede Press)
- Blood Oranges (writing as Kathleen Tierney; 2013, Penguin-Putnam)
- Red Delicious (writing as Kathleen Tierney; 2014, Penguin-Putnam)
- Cherry Bomb (writing as Kathleen Tierney; 2015, Penguin-Putnam)
- Agents of Dreamland (2017, Tor)
- Black Helicopters (2018, Tor)
- The Tindalos Asset (2020; Tor)
- The Night Watchers (forthcoming 2025; Subterranean Press)

== Short fiction collections ==
- Tales of Pain and Wonder (2000, Gauntlet Press; 2002, Meisha Merlin; 2008, Subterranean Press; 2016, PS Publishing)
- Wrong Things (with Poppy Z. Brite; 2001; Subterranean Press)
- From Weird and Distant Shores (2002 and 2022; Subterranean Press)
- To Charles Fort, With Love (2005; Subterranean Press; 2018, PS Publishing)
- Alabaster (2006; Subterranean Press; expanded edition reissued as Alabaster: Pale Horse 2014, Dark Horse Comics)
- A is for Alien (2009; Subterranean Press; 2015, expanded edition from PS Publishing)
- The Ammonite Violin & Others (2010; Subterranean Press; 2018, PS Publishing)
- Two Worlds and in Between: The Best of Caitlin R. Kiernan (Volume One) (2011; Subterranean Press)
- Confessions of a Five-Chambered Heart (2012; Subterranean Press)
- The Ape's Wife and Other Tales (2013; Subterranean Press)
- Beneath an Oil-Dark Sea: The Best of Caitlin R. Kiernan (Volume Two) (2015; Subterranean Press)
- Dear Sweet Filthy World (2017; Subterranean Press)
- Houses Under the Sea: Mythos Tales (2018, Centipede Press; 2019, Subterranean Press)
- The Dinosaur Tourist (2018; Subterranean Press)
- The Very Best of Caitlín R. Kiernan (2019; Tachyon Publications)
- A Little Yellow Book of Fever Dreams (2019; Borderlands Press)
- Comes a Pale Rider (2020, Subterranean Press)
- The Variegated Alphabet (2021, Subterranean Press)
- Vile Affections (2021, Subterranean Press)
- Cambrian Tales: Juvenilia (2021, Subterranean Press)
- Bradbury Weather (2024, Subterranean Press)
- Bright Dead Star (2025, Subterranean Press)

== Short hardbacks ==
- In the Garden of Poisonous Flowers (2002; Subterranean Press)
- The Dry Salvages (novella) (2004; Subterranean Press)
- Frog Toes and Tentacles (2005; Subterranean Press)
- Tales from the Woeful Platypus (2007; Subterranean Press)
- Living a Boy's Adventure Tale (2024; Subterranean Press)
- Zoetrope Bizarre (2025; Subterranean Press)

== Chapbooks ==
- Candles for Elizabeth (1998; Meisha Merlin Publishing)
- A Study for "Estate" (2000; Gauntlet Press)
- On the Road to Jefferson (2002; Subterranean Press)
- Waycross (2002; Subterranean Press)
- Trilobite: The Writing of Threshold (2003; Subterranean Press)
- Embrace the Mutation (with J. K. Potter; 2003; Subterranean Press)
- Alabaster (2003; Camelot Books)
- Mercury (2004; Subterranean Press)
- The Worm in My Mind's Eye (2004; Subterranean Press)
- False/Starts (2005; Subterranean Press)
- A Little Damned Book of Days (2005; Subterranean Press)
- The Merewife: A Prologue (2005; Subterranean Press)
- Highway 97 (2006; Subterranean Press)
- The Black Alphabet: A Primer (2007; Subterranean Press)
- Tails of Tales of Pain and Wonder (2008; Subterranean Press)
- B is for Beginnings (2009; Subterranean Press)
- Sanderlings (2010; Subterranean Press)
- The Crimson Alphabet: Another Primer (2011; Subterranean Press)
- The Yellow Book (2012; Subterranean Press)
- Black Helicopters (2013; Subterranean Press)
- False/Starts II (2015, Subterranean Press)
- The Aubergine Alphabet: A Fourth Primer (2017; Subterranean Press)
- The Chartreuse Alphabet: A Fifth Primer (2018; Subterranean Press)
- Refugees (2020; Subterranean Press)

== Uncollected short fiction (excluding chapbooks) ==
- "A Key to the Castleblakeney Key" (The Thackery T. Lambshead Cabinet of Curiosities, 2011; Harper Voyager)
- "The Jetsam of Disremembered Mechanics" (The Book of Silverberg: Stories in Honor of Robert Silverberg, 2014; Subterranean Press)

== Sirenia Digest ==
- "Madonna Littoralis" (Sirenia Digest #1, December 2005; reprinted in Fantasy Magazine #2, 2006; Wildside Press)
- "Untitled 13" (Sirenia Digest #1, December 2005)
- "Orpheus at Mount Pangeum" (Sirenia Digest #2, January 2006)
- "Pony" (Sirenia Digest #2, January 2006)
- "Bridle" (Sirenia Digest #3, February 2006; reprinted in Street Magicks, Prime Books, 2016)
- "Eisoptrophobia - A Sketch" (Sirenia Digest #3, February 2006)
- "Untitled 17" (Sirenia Digest #3, February 2006)
- "Untitled 20" (Sirenia Digest #4, March 2006)
- "pas-en-arriere" (Sirenia Digest #5, April 2006)
- "For One Who Has Lost Herself" (Sirenia Digest #5, April 2006)
- "Ode to Edvard Munch" (Sirenia Digest #6, May 2006; reprinted in The Mammoth Book of Vampire Romance, Running Press, 2008 and By Blood We Live, Night Shade Books, 2009)
- "The Black Alphabet (Part One)" (Sirenia Digest #6, May 2006)
- "The Black Alphabet (Part Two)" (Sirenia Digest #7, June 2006)
- "The Cryomancer's Daughter (Murder Ballad No. 3)" (Sirenia Digest #8, July 2006)
- "Portrait of the Artist as a Young Ghoul" (Sirenia Digest #9, August 2006)
- "Untitled 23" (Sirenia Digest #10, September 2006)
- "In the Praying Windows" (with Sonya Taaffe, Sirenia Digest #10, September 2006)
- "The Ammonite Violin (Murder Ballad No. 4)" (Sirenia Digest #11, October 2006; reprinted in Dark Delicacies II, 2007; Carroll & Graf; Hauntings, Tachyon Publications, 2013)
- "The Lovesong of Lady Ratteanrufer" (Sirenia Digest #12, November 2006)
- "Metamorphosis A" (Sirenia Digest #12, November 2006)
- "The Voyeur in the House of Glass" (Sirenia Digest #13, December 2006)
- "Metamorphosis B" (Sirenia Digest #13, December 2006)
- "The Sphinx's Kiss" (Sirenia Digest #14, January 2007)
- "A Season of Broken Dolls" (Sirenia Digest #15, February 2007; reprinted in Subterranean Magazine, Spring, 2007; Subterranean Press )
- "Skin Game" (Sirenia Digest #15, February 2007)
- "In View of Nothing" (Sirenia Digest #16, March 2007)
- "Untitled 26" (Sirenia Digest #16, March 2007)
- "Night Games in the Crimson Court" (Sirenia Digest #17, April 2007)
- "Outside the Gates of Eden" (Sirenia Digest #18, May 2007)
- "The Steam Dancer (1896)" (Sirenia Digest #19, June 2007; reprinted in Subterranean: Tales of Dark Fantasy, 2008; Subterranean Press and Steampunk Reloaded, 2010; Tachyon Publications)
- "In the Dreamtime of Lady Resurrection" (Sirenia Digest #20, July 2007; reprinted in Subterranean Magazine, Fall, 2007; Subterranean Press and Zombies: More Recent Dead, Prime Books, 2014)
- "Anamnesis, or the Sleepless Nights of Léon Spilliaert" (Sirenia Digest #20, July 2007)
- "Scene in the Museum (1896)" (Sirenia Digest #21, August 2007)
- "Untitled Grotesque" (Sirenia Digest #22, September 2007)
- "The Madam of the Narrow Houses" (Sirenia Digest #23, October 2007; reprinted in The Mammoth Book of Ghost Stories by Women, 2013; Running Press)
- "The Bed of Appetite" (Sirenia Digest #23, October 2007)
- "The Wolf Who Cried Girl" (Sirenia Digest #24, November 2007)
- "Untitled 31" (Sirenia Digest #25, December 2007)
- "The Crimson Alphabet (Part One)" (Sirenia Digest #25, December 2007)
- "The Crimson Alphabet (Part Two)" (Sirenia Digest #26, January 2008)
- "The Collector of Bones" (Sirenia Digest #26, January 2008)
- "Beatification" (Sirenia Digest #27, February 2008)
- "Pickman's Other Model" (Sirenia Digest #28, March 2008; reprinted in Black Wings: New Tales of Lovecraftian Horror, 2010; PS Publishing and New Cthulhu: The Recent Weird, 2011; Prime Books)
- "Flotsam" (Sirenia Digest #29, April 2008; reprinted in Not One of Us #40 and The Mammoth Book of Vampire Romance 2, 2009; Perseus Books)
- "Regarding Attrition and Severance" (Sirenia Digest #29, April 2008)
- "Rappaccini's Dragon (Murder Ballad No. 5)" (Sirenia Digest #30, May 2008)
- "Unter den Augen des Mondes" (Sirenia Digest #31, June 2008)
- "The Melusine (1898)" (Sirenia Digest #31, June 2008)
- "Derma Sutra (1891)" (Sirenia Digest #32, July 2008)
- "The Z Word" (Sirenia Digest #33, August 2008)
- "Untitled 33" (Sirenia Digest #34, September 2008)
- "I Am the Abyss and I Am the Light" (Sirenia Digest #35, October 2008, reprinted in Aliens: Recent Encounters, Prime Books, 2013)
- "Dancing With the Eight of Swords" (Sirenia Digest #36, November 2008)
- "Murder Ballad No. 5 (Sirenia Digest #37, December 2008)
- "Lullaby of Partition and Reunion" (Sirenia Digest #37, December 2008)
- "The Thousand-and-Third Tale of Scheherazade" (Sirenia Digest #38, January 2009)
- "The Belated Burial" (Sirenia Digest #38, January 2009; reprinted in Subterranean Magazine, Fall, 2009; Subterranean Press and Vampires: The Recent Undead, Prime Books, 2011)
- "The Bone's Prayer" (Sirenia Digest #39, February 2009; reprinted in The Year's Best Dark Fantasy & Horror, Prime Books, 2010)
- "A Canvas for Incoherent Arts" (Sirenia Digest #40, March 2009)
- "The Peril of Liberated Objects, or the Voyeur's Seduction" (Sirenia Digest #41, April 2009)
- "At the Gate of Deeper Slumber" (Sirenia Digest #41, April 2009)
- "Fish Bride" (Sirenia Digest #42, May 2009; reprinted in The Weird Fiction Review #2, 2011 and Weirder Shadows Over Innsmouth, Titan Books, 2015)
- "The Mermaid of the Concrete Ocean" (Sirenia Digest #43, June 2009; reprinted in The Drowning Girl: A Memoir, Roc, 2012 and Mermaids and Other Mysteries of the Deep, Prime Books, 2015)
- "The Alchemist's Daughter (a fragment)" (Sirenia Digest #43, June 2009)
- "Vicaria Draconis" (Sirenia Digest #44, July 2009)
- "January 28, 1926" (Sirenia Digest #44, July 2009)
- "Werewolf Smile" (Sirenia Digest #45, August 2009; reprinted in The Drowning Girl: A Memoir, Roc, 2012)
- "Paleozoic Annunciation" (Sirenia Digest #45, August 2009)
- "Charcloth, Firesteel, and Flint" (Sirenia Digest #46, September 2009; reprinted in A Book of Horrors, 2011; PS Publishing)
- "Shipwrecks Above" (Sirenia Digest #46, September 2009; reprinted in Blood Sisters: Vampire Stories by Women, Nightshade Books, 2015)
- "The Dissevered Heart" (Sirenia Digest #47, October 2009)
- "Exuvium" (Sirenia Digest #48, November 2009)
- "Untitled 34" (Sirenia Digest #49, December 2009)
- "Hydrarguros" (Sirenia Digest #50, January 2010; reprinted in Subterranean: Tales of Dark Fantasy 2, 2011; Subterranean Press)
- "The Eighth Veil" (Sirenia Digest #51, February 2010)
- "Persephone Redux (A Fragment)" (Sirenia Digest #51, February 2010)
- "Apsinthion" (Sirenia Digest #51, February 2010)
- "Houndwife" (Sirenia Digest #52, March 2010; reprinted in Black Wings II, 2012; PS Publishing)
- "Three Months, Three Scenes, With Snow" (Sirenia Digest #53, April 2010)
- "Workprint" (Sirenia Digest #53, April 2010)
- "Tempest Witch" (Sirenia Digest #54, May 2010)
- "Tidal Forces" (Sirenia Digest #55, June 2010; reprinted in Eclipse Four, 2011; Night Shade Books)
- "The Yellow Alphabet (Part One)" (Sirenia Digest #56, July 2010)
- "The Yellow Alphabet (Part Two)" (Sirenia Digest #57, August 2010)
- "Fairy Tale of the Maritime" (Sirenia Digest #57, August 2010)
- "John Four" (Sirenia Digest #58, September 2010; reprinted in A Mountain Walked, 2014; Centipede Press)
- "And the Cloud That Took the Form" (Sirenia Digest #59, October 2010)
- "On the Reef" (Sirenia Digest #59, October 2010; reprinted in Halloween, Prime Books, 2011 and Weirder Shadows Over Innsmouth, Titan Books, 2015)
- "The Prayer of Ninety Cats" (Sirenia Digest #60, November 2010; reprinted in Subterranean Magazine, Spring, 2013; Subterranean Press and The Year's Best Dark Fantasy and Science Fiction, Prime Books, 2014)
- "—30—" (Sirenia Digest #61, December 2010; reprinted in Magic City: Recent Spells, Prime Books, 2014)
- "Random Thoughts Before a Fatal Crash" (Sirenia Digest #64, March 2011; reprinted in Subterranean Magazine, Spring, 2012; Subterranean Press )
- "The Carnival is Dead and Gone" (Sirenia Digest #65, April 2011)
- "Untitled 35" (Sirenia Digest #66, May 2011)
- "Figurehead" (Sirenia Digest #66, May 2011)
- "Down to Gehenna" (Sirenia Digest #67, June 2011)
- "The Granting Cabinet" (Sirenia Digest #68, July 2011)
- "Slouching Towards the House of Glass Coffins" (Sirenia Digest #69, August 2011)
- "Evensong" (Sirenia Digest #70, September 2011)
- "Dear Daughter Desmodus" (Sirenia Digest #70, September 2011)
- "Latitude 41°21'45.89"N, Longitude 71°29'0.62"W" (Sirenia Digest #71, October 2011)
- "Another Tale of Two Cities" (Sirenia Digest #72, November 2011)
- "Blast the Human Flower" (Sirenia Digest #73, December 2011)
- "The Lost Language of Littoral Mollusca and Crustacea; Part the First" (Sirenia Digest #73, December 2011)
- "Cammufare" (Sirenia Digest #74, January 2012)
- "The Transition of Elizabeth Haskings" (Sirenia Digest #74, January 2012; reprinted in Weirder Shadows Over Innsmouth, Titan Books, 2015)
- "Here Is No Why" (Sirenia Digest #75, February 2012)
- "Cages I" (with David T. Kirkpatrick; Sirenia Digest #76, March 2012)
- "Hauplatte/Gegenplatte" (Sirenia Digest #77, April 2012)
- "Love is Forbidden, We Croak and Howl" (Sirenia Digest #78, May 2012; reprinted in Lovecraft's Monsters, Tachyon Publications, 2014)
- "Quiet Houses" (Sirenia Digest #79, June 2012)
- "One Tree Hill (The World As Cataclysm)" (Sirenia Digest #80, July 2012; reprinted in Black Wings III: New Tales of Lovecraftian Horror, PS Publishing, 2014)
- "Tall Bodies" (Sirenia Digest #80, July 2012)
- "Our Lady of Tharsis Tholus" (Sirenia Digest #81, August 2012; reprinted as "Our Lady of Arsia Mons" in Dreams from the Witch House: Female Voices in Lovecraftian Horror, Dark Regions Press, 2015)
- "A Mountain Walked" (Sirenia Digest #82, September 2012; reprinted in The Madness of Cthulhu: Volume 1, 2014; Titan Book)
- "Whilst the Night Rejoices Profound and Still" (Sirenia Digest #83, October 2012; reprinted in Halloween: Magic, Mystery, and the Macabre, Prime Books, 2013)
- "Blind Fish" (Sirenia Digest #85, December 2012, reprinted in Searchers After Horror: New Tales of the Weird and Fantastic, Fedogan and Bremer, 2014)
- "What Dread Hand? What Dread Grasp?" (Sirenia Digest #86, February 2013)
- "Sea-Drift" (Sirenia Digest #87, March 2013)
- "Turning the Little Key" (Sirenia Digest #88, April 2013)
- "Elegy for a Suicide" (Sirenia Digest #90, July 2013)
- "Pushing the Sky Away (Death of a Blasphemer)" (Sirenia Digest #91, August 2013; reprinted in Subterranean Magazine, Summer, 2014; Subterranean Press )
- "Study for The Witch House" (Sirenia Digest #92, September 2013)
- "Pickman's Madonna" (Sirenia Digest #93, October 2013)
- "Mote[L] 2032" (Sirenia Digest #94, November 2013; reprinted as "Late Night Motel Signal" in Black Helicopters, May 2018, Tor.com)
- "The Peddler's Tale, Or Isobel's Revenge" (Sirenia Digest #95, December 2013; reprinted in The Mammoth Book of Cthulhu, Robinson/Running Press, 2016)
- "Idyll for a Purgatory Dancer" (Sirenia Digest #96, January 2014)
- "Chewing on Shadows" (Sirenia Digest #97, February 2014)
- "The Beginning of the Year Without a Summer" (Sirenia Digest #99, April 2014; reprinted in The Monstrous, Tachyon Publications, 2015)
- "Interstate Love Song (Murder Ballad No. 8)" (Sirenia Digest #100, May 2014; reprinted in The Best Science Fiction and Fantasy of the Year: Volume 9, Solaris, 2015 and The Best Horror of the Year, Volume 7, Night Shade Books, 2015)
- "Far From Any Shore" (Sirenia Digest #101, June 2014; reprinted in Black Wings V: New Tales of Lovecraftian Horror, PS Publishing, 2016)
- "The Cats of River Street (1925)" (Sirenia Digest #102, July 2014; reprinted in Innsmouth Nightmares, PS Publishing, 2015))
- "Black Glass, Green Glass" (Sirenia Digest #103, August 2014)
- "A Birth in the Wood of Self-Murderers" (Sirenia Digest #104, September 2014)
- "The Green Abyss" (Sirenia Digest #106, November 2014)
- "The Cripple and the Starfish" (Sirenia Digest #108, January 2015; reprinted in The Year's Best Dark Fantasy and Science Fiction, Prime Books, 2016)
- "The Aubergine Alphabet (Part One)" (Sirenia Digest #109, February 2015)
- "The Aubergine Alphabet (Part Two)" (Sirenia Digest #110, March 2015)
- "Dancy Vs. the Pterosaur" (Sirenia Digest #111, April 2015; reprinted in The Best Science Fiction and Fantasy of the Year: Volume 10, Solaris, 2016)
- "Le Meneur des loups" (Sirenia Digest #112, May 2015)
- "Dead Letter Office" (Sirenia Digest #113, June 2015; reprinted in Nightmare's Realm: New Tales of the Weird and Fantastic, Dark Regions Press, 2016)
- "Dry Bones" (Sirenia Digest #114, July 2015)
- Agents of Dreamland (excerpts) (Sirenia Digest #115, August 2015)
- "Eurydice Eduction" (Sirenia Digest #119, December 2015)
- "Study for an Electronaut's Ovid (AD 2052)" (Sirenia Digest #120, January 2016)
- "Pillbug" (Sirenia Digest #122, March 2016)
- "When Even the Darkness Is Something To See (A Fragment)" (Sirenia Digest #123, May 2016)
- "Epithalamium (A Fragment)" (Sirenia Digest #123, May 2016)
- "Whisper Road (Murder Ballad No. 9)" (Sirenia Digest #125, July 2016; reprinted in The Year's Best Dark Fantasy and Science Fiction, Prime Books, 2017)
- "The Chartreuse Alphabet (Part One)" (Sirenia Digest #128, September 2016)
- "Animals Pull the Night Around Their Shoulders" (Sirenia Digest #128, September 2016)
- "The Chartreuse Alphabet (Part Two)" (Sirenia Digest #129, October 2016)
- "Antediluvian Homesick Blues" (Sirenia Digest #129, October 2016)
- "The Line Between the Devil's Teeth (Murder Ballad No. 10)" (Sirenia Digest #130, November 2016; reprinted in The Best Science Fiction and Fantasy of the Year: Volume 11, Solaris, 2017)
- "Untitled Psychiatrist #1" (Sirenia Digest #131, December 2016)
- "The Sick Rose, Redux" (Sirenia Digest #131, December 2016)
- "Tupelo (1998)" (Sirenia Digest #132, January 2017)
- "Untitled Psychiatrist #2" (Sirenia Digest #133, February 2017)
- "Ballad of a Catamite Revolver" (Sirenia Digest #134, March 2017)
- "In the Flat Field" (Sirenia Digest #135, April 2017)
- "Untitled Psychiatrist #3" (Sirenia Digest #136, May 2017)
- "Fairy Tale of Wood Street" (Sirenia Digest #137, June 2017; reprinted in The Best Science Fiction and Fantasy of the Year: Volume 12, Solaris, 2018)
- "The Dinosaur Tourist" (Sirenia Digest #139, August 2017; reprinted in The Year's Best Dark Fantasy and Science Fiction, Prime Books, 2018)
- "Theoretically Forbidden Morphologies (1988)" (Sirenia Digest #140, September 2017)
- "Albatross (1994)" (Sirenia Digest #141, October 2017)
- "King Laugh (Four Scenes)" (Sirenia Digest #142, November 2017)
- "Behind the Wall of Sleep" (Sirenia Digest #143, December 2017)
- "As Water Is In Water" (Sirenia Digest #144, January 2018)
- "Chevy Swamp" (Sirenia Digest #145, February 2018)
- "Virginia Story" (Sirenia Digest #146, March 2018; reprinted in The Weird Fiction Review #9, 2018)
- "Day After Tomorrow, the Flood" (Sirenia Digest #147, April 2018)
- "The Eldritch Alphabētos (Part 1)" (Sirenia Digest #148, May 2018)
- "A Chance of Frogs on Wednesday" (Sirenia Digest #149, June 2018)
- "The Eldritch Alphabētos (Part 2)" (Sirenia Digest #150, July 2018)
- "Cherry Street Tango, Sweatbox Waltz" (Sirenia Digest #151, August 2018)
- "Untitled 41" (Sirenia Digest #152, September 2018)
- "Iodine and Iron" (Sirenia Digest #153, October 2018)
- "The Lady and the Tiger Redux" (Sirenia Digest #156, January 2019)
- "Which Describes a Looking-Glass and the Broken Fragments" (Sirenia Digest #158, March 2019)
- "Metamorphosis C" (Sirenia Digest #159, April 2019)
- "The Last Thing You Should Do" (Sirenia Digest #160, May 2019)
- "The Tameness of Wolves" (Sirenia Digest #161, June 2019)
- "Untitled 44" (Sirenia Digest #162, July 2019)
- "The Surgeon's Photo" (Sirenia Digest #163, August 2019)
- "Wisteria" (Sirenia Digest #164, September 2019)
- "Refugees" (Sirenia Digest #165, October 2019)
- "Mercy Brown" (Sirenia Digest #166, November 2019)
- "Seven Dreams" (Sirenia Digest #167, December 2019)
- "The Cerulean Alphabet (Part One)" (Sirenia Digest #168, January 2020)
- "The Cerulean Alphabet (Part Two)" (Sirenia Digest #169, February 2020)
- "The Great Bloody and Bruised Veil of the World" (Sirenia Digest #170, March 2020)
- "Untitled Psychiatrist #4" (Sirenia Digest #171, April 2021; reprinted in The Year's Best Dark Fantasy and Horror #2 as "Dead Bright Star [July 1987]", Pyre Books, 2022)
- "In Utero, In Tenebris" (Sirenia Digest #172, May 2020)
- "Untitled 46" (Sirenia Digest #173, June 2020)
- "The Man Who Loved What Was" (Sirenia Digest #174, July 2020)
- "Untitled 45" (Sirenia Digest #175, August 2021)
- "L'hommes et la femme terribles" (Sirenia Digest #176, September 2020)
- "Untitled Psychiatrist #5" (Sirenia Digest #177, October 2020)
- "The Woman Who Blew Down Houses" (Sirenia Digest #178, November 2020)
- "Threnody for Those Who Die December Deaths" (Sirenia Digest #179, December 2020)
- "Blackwater" (Sirenia Digest #180, January 2021)
- "Heart-Shaped Hole" (Sirenia Digest #181, February 2021)
- "The Jar" (Sirenia Digest #182, March 2021)
- "Two Monsters Walk Into a Bar" (Sirenia Digest #183, April 2021)
- The Night Watchers, "False Start One" (Sirenia Digest #184, May 2021)
- "Pygmalion As a Hammer" (Sirenia Digest #185, June 2021)
- "A Barrenness of Daffodils, A Lerna of Ills" (Part One) (Sirenia Digest #186, July 2021)
- "A Barrenness of Daffodils, A Lerna of Ills" (Part Two) (Sirenia Digest #187, August 2021)
- "M is for Mars" (Part One) (Sirenia Digest #188, September 2021)
- "M is for Mars" (Part Two) (Sirenia Digest #189, October 2021)
- The Night Watchers, "False Start Two" (Sirenia Digest #190, November 2021)
- "Metamorphosis D (Imago)" (Sirenia Digest #191, December 2021)
- "Excerpt from American Novel" (Sirenia Digest #192, January 2022)
- "Requiem" (Sirenia Digest #193, February 2022)
- "Pump Excursion" (Sirenia Digest #194, March 2022)
- "Excerpts from Beowulf (novelization)" (Sirenia Digest #195, April 2022)
- "The Merewife" (Sirenia Digest #196, May 2022)
- Living a Boy's Adventure Tale (Part 1) (Sirenia Digest #197, June 2022)
- Living a Boy's Adventure Tale (Part 2) (Sirenia Digest #198, July 2022)
- Living a Boy's Adventure Tale (Part 3) (Sirenia Digest #199, August 2022)
- "A Travelogue for Oneironauts" (Sirenia Digest #200, September 2022)
- "Passage of Venus in Front of the Sun" (Sirenia Digest #201, October 2022)
- "Discord in Anthracite" (Sirenia Digest #202, November 2022)
- "Build Your Houses With Their Backs to the Sea" (Sirenia Digest #203, December 2022; reprinted in The Best Horror of the Year, Volume 16, Night Shade Books, 2024)
- "Crotalus (Murder Ballad No. 13)" (Sirenia Digest #204, January 2023)
- "Untitled Psychiatrist No. 6" (Sirenia Digest #205, February 2023)
- "The Moment Under the Moment" (Sirenia Digest #206, March 2023)
- "Black Water (Murder Ballad No. 14)" (Sirenia Digest #207, April 2023)
- "A Buyer's Guide to the Commonplace Bizarre" (Sirenia Digest #208, May 2023)
- "Neither From Nor Towards" (Sirenia Digest #209, June 2023)
- "Excerpt from The Night Watchers" (Sirenia Digest #210, July 2023)
- "Ovid Under Glass" (Sirenia Digest #211, August 2023)
- "Ulysses and the Sirens" (Sirenia Digest #212, September 2023)
- "Gorgon" (Sirenia Digest #213, October 2023)
- "Night Fishing" (Sirenia Digest #214, November 2023; reprinted from Weird Tales, Vol. 68, No. 1, Issue 368)
- "Strandling" (Sirenia Digest #215, December 2023; reprinted from Screams from the Dark, Nightfire, 2022)
- "Angels You Can See Through" (Sirenia Digest #216, January 2024)
- "Tella Mater (Dissolve)" (Sirenia Digest #217, February 2024)
- "Untitled 47" (Sirenia Digest #218, March 2024)
- "Whom These Chains Become Not So" (Sirenia Digest #219, April 2024)
- "Dark Adapted Eyes" (Sirenia Digest #220, May 2024)
- "The Ultraviolet Alphabet (Part One)" (Sirenia Digest #221, June 2024)
- "The Ultraviolet Alphabet (Part Two)" (Sirenia Digest #222, July 2024)
- "Wild Things" (Sirenia Digest #223, August 2024)
- "The Hunger Throne" (Sirenia Digest #224, September 2024)
- "Darkness, On the Face of the Deep" (Sirenia Digest #225, October 2024)
- "The Beholder's Share" (Sirenia Digest #226, November 2024)
- "Forests of the Night: Lycanthrope Triptych" (Sirenia Digest #227, December 2024)
- "The Visitor, the Brightness, and Glory" (Part One) (Sirenia Digest #228, January 2025)
- "The Visitor, the Brightness, and Glory" (Part Two) (Sirenia Digest #229, February 2025)
- "Earth Covers Earth" (Sirenia Digest #231, April 2025)
- "Pale Rollers" (Sirenia Digest #232, May 2025)
- "Olympian Peekshow Seranade" (Sirenia Digest #233, November 2025 [20th anniversary issue])
- "Gethsemane" (Sirenia Digest #235, March 2025)
- "East of the Sun, West of the Moon" (Sirenia Digest #236, May 2025)
- "Ballad of an Echo Whisperer" (Sirenia Digest #237, July 2025)

== Comics/graphic novels ==
- The Dreaming (DC Comics; October 1997- May 2001)
  - The Dreaming #17—19, "Souvenirs" (October '97—December '97)
  - The Dreaming #22—24, "An Unkindness of One" (March '98-May '98)
  - The Dreaming #26, "Restitution" (July '98)
  - The Dreaming #27, "Stormy Weather" (July '98)
  - The Dreaming #28, "Dreams the Burning Dream" (August '98)
  - The Dreaming #30, "Temporary Overflow" (September '98)
  - The Dreaming #31, "November Eve" (coauthored with Peter Hogan; December '98)
  - The Dreaming #33, "Dream Below" (February '99)
  - The Dreaming #34, "Ruin" (March '99)
  - The Dreaming #35, "Kaleidoscope" (April '99)
  - The Dreaming #36, "Slow Dying" (May '99)
  - The Dreaming #37, "Pariah" (June '99)
  - The Dreaming #38, "Apostate" (July '99)
  - The Dreaming #39, "The Lost Language of Flowers" (August '99)
  - The Dreaming #40, "New Orleans for Free" (September '99)
  - The Dreaming #41, "The Bittersweet Scent of Opium" (October '99)
  - The Dreaming #42, "Detonation Boulevard" (November '99)
  - The Dreaming #43, "The Two Trees" (December '99)
  - The Dreaming #44, "Homesick" (January '00)
  - The Dreaming #45, "Masques & Hedgehogs" (February '00)
  - The Dreaming #46, "Mirror, Mirror" (March '00)
  - The Dreaming #47, "Trinket" (April '00)
  - The Dreaming #48, "Scary Monsters" (May '00)
  - The Dreaming #49, "Shatter" (June '00)
  - The Dreaming #50, "Restoration" (July '00)
  - The Dreaming #51, "Second Sight" (August '00)
  - The Dreaming #52—54, "Exiles" (September '00—November '00)
  - The Dreaming #56, "The First Adventure of Miss Catterina Poe" (January '01)
  - The Dreaming #57—60, "Rise" (February '01—May '01; series finale)
- Vertigo: Winter's Edge #1, "The Dreaming: Deck the Halls" ('98; coauthored with Peter Hogan)
- Vertigo: Winter's Edge #2, "The Dreaming: Marble Halls" ('99)
- Vertigo: Winter's Edge #3, "The Dreaming: Borealis" ('00)
- The Girl Who Would Be Death (four-issue miniseries; 1998–1999)
- Bast: Eternity Game (three-issue miniseries; 2002)
- Alabaster: Wolves (Dark Horse Comics, five-issue miniseries, 2012; hardback collection, 2013)
- Alabaster: Boxcar Tales (Dark Horse Comics, five-issue miniseries, 2012–2013; hardback released as Alabaster: Grimmer Tales, April 2014)
- Alabaster: The Good, the Bad, and the Bird (Dark Horse Comics, five-issue miniseries, 2015–2016; hardback collection, 2016)

== Nonfiction (partial list) ==
- "Approximately 2,000 Words About Poppy Z. Brite" (1997 World Horror Convention Program Book).
- "...And in Closing (For Now)" (afterword for Are You Loathsome Tonight by Poppy Z. Brite; Gauntlet Publications, 1998).
- "Life After Neil" (Tropicon XVII Program Book, 1998)
- "Foreword" (Gloomcookie, Vol. 1 written by Serena Valentino and illustrated by Ted Naifeh; SLG Publishing, 2001)
- "Introduction" (Kissing Carrion by Gemma Files; Prime Books, 2003)
- "Life After Neil Redux" (Fiddler's Green Program Book, 2004)
- "Skin by Kathe Koja" (Horror: Another 100 Best Books; Carroll & Graf, 2005)
- "Notes From A Damned Life" (Weird Tales #444; April/May 2007)
- "Awful Things" (Locus #556; May 2007)
- "The Most Beautiful Music I've Ever Read" (introduction for Ray Bradbury's The Day It Rained Forever; PS Publishing, 2008)
- "Lovecraft and I" (Lovecraft Annual #5; August 2011)
- "Afterword" (Masters of the Weird Tales: Arthur Machen; Centipede Press, 2013)
- "For Melanie (A Short Appreciation, With Footnotes)" (afterword for Singularity and Other Stories by Melanie Tem; Centipede Press, 2017)
- "Introduction" (introduction to Everville by Clive Barker, special edition, Gauntlet Press, 2018)
- "Wrong In All It's Dimensions" (Introduction to The Haunting of Hill House by Shirley Jackson, special edition, Centipede Press, 2020)

=== Scientific publications (partial list) ===
- Kiernan, C.R. and Shannon, S.W. 1988a. Selmasaurus russelli, a new plioplatecarpine mosasaur (Squamata, Mosasauridae) from Alabama. Journal of Vertebrate Paleontology 8(1): 102-107.
- Kiernan, C.R. 1988b. The first record of Clidastes liodontus (Squamata, Mosasauridae) from the eastern United States. Journal of Vertebrate Paleontology 8(3): 343-345.
- Kiernan, C.R. 1989. On the taxonomic status of Moanasaurus mangahouangae Wiffen (Squamata: Mosasauridae). Journal of Paleontology. 63(1): 126-127.
- Kiernan, C. R., and Schwimmer, D. R. 2004. First record of a velociraptorine theropod (Tetanurae, Dromaeosauridae) from the Eastern Gulf Coastal United States. The Mosasaur 7:89-93.
- Kiernan, C. R. 2002. Stratigraphic distribution and habitat segregation of mosasaurs in the Upper Cretaceous of western and central Alabama, with an historical review of Alabama mosasaur discoveries. 22(1):91-103. abstract online
- Schwimmer, D. R. and Kiernan, C.R. 2001. Eastern Late Cretaceous theropods in North America and the crossing of the Interior Seaway. Journal of Vertebrate Paleontology 21(3):99A.
- Kiernan, C. R. 1992. Clidastes Cope, 1868 (Reptilia, Sauria): proposed designation of Clidastes propython Cope, 1869 as the type species. Bulletin of Zoological Nomenclature 49:137–139.
- Gentry, A. D., Ebersole, J. A., and Kiernan, C. R. 2019. Asmodochelys parhami, a new fossil marine turtle from the Campanian Demopolis Chalk and the stratigraphic congruence of competing marine turtle phylogenies. Royal Society Open Science 6(12). Article ID:191950. article online
- Gentry, Andrew D., Kiernan, Caitlín R., Parham, James F. 2022. "A large non-marine turtle from the Upper Cretaceous of Alabama and a review of North American 'Macrobaenids.'" The Anatomical Record 1-20: https://doi.org/10.1002/ar.25054.
- Kiernan, C.R. and J.A. Ebersole. 2023. Two new plioplatecarpine mosasaurs (Mosasauridae; Plioplatecarpinae) of the genus Ectenosaurus from the Upper Cretaceous of North America. PaleoBios 40(13):1-28. https://doi.org/10.5070/P9401362375
