= Candles for Elizabeth =

1998 chapbook by Caitlin R. Kiernan

- Author: Caitlin R. Kiernan
- Publisher: Meisha Merlin Publishing
- Publication date: May 1, 1998
- ISBN: 978-0-965-83458-2

Candles for Elizabeth (ISBN 0-9658345-8-1) is fantasist Caitlin R. Kiernan's first chapbook, released in 1998 by Meisha Merlin Publishing, shortly before the release of Kiernan's debut novel, Silk. It includes an introduction by Poppy Z. Brite. The contents of this chapbook were later incorporated into Kiernan's first short-story collection, Tales of Pain and Wonder. The author provided afterwords for each story, discussing their inspiration. According to an interview conducted by Jessa Crispin, the title is a reference to the suicide of Kiernan's close friend, Elizabeth Tillman Aldridge, in 1995. Kiernan's Alabaster, written in 2006, is dedicated to Aldridge as well. These stories were later included in Kiernan's first short-fiction collection, Tales of Pain and Wonder (Gauntlet, 2000).

== Stories ==
- Introduction (by Poppy Z. Brite)
  - "The Last Child of Lir"
  - "A Story for Edward Gorey"
  - "Postcards from the King of Tides"
