= Exquisite Corpse (novel) =

1996 novel by Poppy Z. Brite

- First edition (UK)
- Author: William J. Martin
- Language: English
- Genre: Horror
- Publisher: Orion (UK); Touchstone (US)
- Publication date: Jul 1996 (UK); Aug 1996 (US)
- Publication place: United States
- Media type: Print (Paperback)
- Pages: 240 pp (Paperback edition)
- ISBN: 0-684-83627-0 (Paperback)
- OCLC: 38225918

Exquisite Corpse is a horror novel by American writer William J. Martin (formerly known and hereafter referred to as Poppy Z. Brite). The protagonist of the story is Andrew Compton, an English convicted homosexual serial killer, cannibal and necrophiliac. Brite has described it as "a necrophilic, cannibalistic, serial killer love story that explores the seamy politics of victimhood and disease."

== Plot ==
The novel unfolds in alternating chapters from the points of view of the four main characters. Andrew Compton, a convicted serial killer (based on serial killer Dennis Nilsen), escapes his UK prison cell in a self-induced cataleptic trance. Mistaken for dead by the authorities, he makes his way to New Orleans' French Quarter to start a new life. Seeking new victims, he instead meets Jay Byrne (based on Jeffrey Dahmer), a wealthy recluse who is also a serial killer, as well as a cannibal. The two at first intend to victimize one another, but upon realizing their similar proclivities, instead begin a torrid affair based on sex and murder.

After learning that he is HIV-positive, writer Lucas Ransom reacts by rejecting all his former friends and breaking up with his teenage lover Tran. Increasingly embittered by his illness, Lucas vents his frustration through his alternate persona "Lush Rimbaud", host of a pirate radio program (in a pirate station with the callsign "WHIV") where Lucas rails at society's denial of gay men and the AIDS epidemic (coincidentally, the callsign would be used in real life for a licensed station in New Orleans that chose the call letters specifically to remove stigma about HIV/AIDS but with no other relation to Brite's novel). Soon even this outlet isn't enough, and Lucas, sensing that death is approaching, becomes fixated on reconciling with Tran.

Meanwhile, Tran is driven from his home after his parents learn that he is gay. Tran, who previously had a casual acquaintance with Jay, takes refuge at Jay's home, where the two have a brief sexual encounter. Jay finds himself emotionally drawn to the beautiful, vulnerable Tran but refuses to pursue him any further because he cannot conceive of a relationship that does not end in death. When Jay introduces Tran to Andrew, Andrew becomes obsessed with the idea of murdering and eating him. Jay, though reluctant, agrees to Andrew's plan, in part to rid himself of the temptation of falling in love with Tran. The two kidnap Tran and begin to slowly torture him to death.

Lucas realizes that Tran has fallen into Andrew and Jay's deadly hands, and the goal becomes not reuniting with Tran, but rescuing him. Arriving too late to save him, Lucas murders Jay and confronts Andrew. Recognizing that Lucas is already on the verge of death, Andrew refuses to kill him, instead offering him several means to commit suicide. Lucas realizes that his life, no matter how short, is still of value to him and flees, telling no one what he has seen.

After partially consuming Jay in a final act of love, Andrew leaves New Orleans to continue his murderous career, while Lucas, returning home, vows to spend his remaining time writing a novel to try to make sense of what he has witnessed.

== Publication history ==
In 1991, Brite signed a contract to write three novels for Delacorte Books, the first two being Lost Souls and Drawing Blood, with Exquisite Corpse set to be the third. In early 1995, Brite turned in the finished manuscript of Exquisite Corpse and was informed that Delacorte would be unable to publish the novel due to its violent content. Soon afterwards, Brite received word that Penguin, then the author's UK publisher, had also declined the novel. The work bounced from publisher to publisher, who praised the novel's writing but ultimately rejected it, calling its subject matter "too nihilistic, too extreme, a bloodbath without justification". The book was eventually purchased by Simon & Schuster in the US and Orion Publishing Group in the UK.

== See also ==
- Cannibalism in popular culture
