= Wrong Things =

2001 short story collection by Poppy Brite and Caitlin Kiernan

- First edition cover
- Author: Poppy Brite; Caitlin Kiernan
- Cover artist: Richard Kirk
- Language: English
- Genre: Fantasy, Horror
- Published: Burton, MI : Subterranean Press, 2001.
- Media type: Book, collection
- Pages: 129
- ISBN: 9781931081252
- OCLC: 48543278

Wrong Things is a short story collection by Poppy Z. Brite and Caitlin R. Kiernan. It was released by Subterranean Press in 2001. The cover art and illustrations were provided by Canadian artist Richard A. Kirk. Kiernan's solo contribution to the book, "Onion", received the 2001 International Horror Guild Award for Best Short Story and was chosen for The Year's Best Fantasy and Horror, Fifteenth Annual Collection (edited by Terri Windling and Ellen Datlow; St. Martin's, 2001). Kiernan and Brite's collaborative story, "The Rest of the Wrong Thing," is set in Brite's fictional town of Missing Mile, also appearing in his novels Lost Souls (1992) and Drawing Blood (1993). This is the second short story the two authors have coauthored, the first being "Night Story 1973," which appeared in Kiernan's collection, From Weird and Distant Shores (2002).

== Contents ==
- "The Crystal Empire" (Poppy Z. Brite)
- "Onion" (Caitlin R. Kiernan)
- "The Rest of the Wrong Thing" (Brite and Kiernan)
- Afterword (Caitlin R. Kiernan)

== ISBN ==
- ISBN 1-931081-25-5 (hardback, 2001)
