= Soul Kitchen =

Soul Kitchen may refer to:

- Soul Kitchen (film), a 2009 film directed by Fatih Akın
- "Soul Kitchen" (song), a 1967 song by The Doors from their self-titled debut album The Doors
- JBJ Soul Kitchen, a self-help restaurant run by Jon Bon Jovi in New Jersey
- Soul Kitchen, a 2006 novel by Poppy Z. Brite, part of the Liquor novel series
