= The Devil You Know =

"The devil you know" is a reference to the proverb "better the devil you know than the devil you don't", describing ambiguity aversion.

The Devil You Know may refer to:

== Film and television ==
- The Devil You Know (film), a 2013 thriller film
- "The Devil You Know" (Ballers), a 2018 television episode
- "The Devil You Know" (Daredevil)
- "The Devil You Know" (Justified), an episode of the TV series Justified
- "The Devil You Know" (Person of Interest), an episode of the TV series Person of Interest
- "The Devil You Know" (Stargate SG-1), an episode of the television series Stargate SG-1
- "The Devil You Know" (Supernatural), an episode of the television series Supernatural
- The Devil You Know, a 2015 American drama series pilot written by Jenji Kohan
- The Devil You Know (TV series), a series on cable channel Investigation Discovery
- "The Devil You Know" (Yes Minister), a 1981 episode of the BBC comedy series Yes Minister

== Literature ==
- The Devil You Know (short story collection), a collection by Poppy Z. Brite
- The Devil You Know, a novel by Mike Carey
- The Devil You Know: A Black Power Manifesto, a 2021 book by Charles M. Blow
- The Devil You Know: Encounters in Forensic Psychiatry, a 2021 book by Eileen Horne, Gwen Adshead
- The Devil You Know, a 2016 novella by K.J. Parker

== Music ==
- Light the Torch, American metalcore band formerly known as Devil You Know
- The Devil You Know (Econoline Crush album), 1997
- The Devil You Know, a 2006 album by Todd Snider
- The Devil You Know (Heaven & Hell album), 2009
- The Devil You Know (Rickie Lee Jones album), 2012
- The Devil You Know (The Coathangers album), 2019
- "The Devil You Know", a 1993 song by Jesus Jones from Perverse
- "The Devil You Know", a song by Bill Russell and Henry Krieger from the 1997 musical Side Show
- "The Devil You Know", a 2011 song by Anthrax from Worship Music
- "The Devil You Know", a 2015 song by Sharon Kovacs
- "The Devil You Know", a 2017 song by X Ambassadors
- The Devils You Know, an album by punk band The Other
- The Devil You Know (L.A. Guns album), 2019

== See also ==
- Devil You Know (disambiguation)
- "Better the Devil You Know", a song
