= Plastic Jesus =

Plastic Jesus may refer to:

- Plastic Jesus (song), an American folk song written by George Cromarty and Ed Rush
- Plastic Jesus (novella), by Poppy Z. Brite
- Plastic Jesus (artist), anonymous artist based in Los Angeles, California
- Plastic Jesus, a 1971 film by Lazar Stojanović
- Plastic Jesus, a novel by Robert Miskimon
