= Are You Loathsome Tonight? =

1998 collection of short stories by Poppy Z. Brite

- Author: Poppy Z. Brite
- Cover artist: J. K. Potter
- Language: English
- Genre: Horror
- Published: 1998
- Publisher: Gauntlet Press
- Pages: 185
- ISBN: 1887368256

Are You Loathsome Tonight? (also titled Self-Made Man) is a collection of short stories by American author Poppy Z. Brite, published in 1998 by Gauntlet Press. The title is a play on the song "Are You Lonesome Tonight?," made famous by Elvis Presley, and a reference to the inner groove etching of the 1986 single "Ask" by The Smiths.

== Stories ==
- Introduction by Peter Straub
- "In Vermis Veritas"
- "Arise"
- "Saved" (with Christa Faust)
- "King of the Cats" (with David Ferguson)
- "Self-Made Man"
- "Pin Money"
- "America"
- "Entertaining Mr. Orton"
- "Monday's Special (A Dr. Brite story)"
- "Vine of the Soul"
- "Mussolini and the Axeman's Jazz"
- "Are You Loathsome Tonight?"
- "...And in Closing (For Now)" by Caitlín R. Kiernan
