= Dry Salvages =

The Dry Salvages may refer to:

- the Dry Salvages (Massachusetts), a group of rocks off Rockport, Massachusetts
- The Dry Salvages, a poem by T. S. Eliot about the Massachusetts island
- The Dry Salvages (novella), a novella by Caitlín R. Kiernan, whose title refers to the poem
- Dry Salvages, an alternative name for the Portuguese Selvagens Islands off Madeira
