= WHIV-LP =

Radio station in New Orleans, Louisiana

New Orleans, Louisiana; United States
- Frequency: 102.3 MHz

Programming
- Format: Community radio
- Affiliations: Pacifica Radio Network

Ownership
- Owner: New Orleans Society for Infectious Disease Awareness

History
- First air date: December 1, 2014

Technical information
- Licensing authority: FCC
- Facility ID: 193392
- ERP: 36 watts
- HAAT: 49.4026 m (162.082 ft)
- Transmitter coordinates: 29°57′42.43″N 90°5′20.95″W

Links
- Public license information: LMS
- Website: whivfm.org

WHIV-LP is a community radio station on 102.3 FM in New Orleans, Louisiana, covering the Mid-City area. It is owned by the New Orleans Society for Infectious Disease Awareness (NOSIDA) and broadcasts from studios on Orleans Avenue and a transmitter atop the Tulane Tower office complex.

== History ==
I am an HIV physician and face HIV stigma daily. So, the best way to deal with stigma that surrounds HIV is to repeat the word 'HIV' over and over and over again on [a] daily basis, weekly basis, monthly basis and yearly basis.

— Dr. MarkAlain Dery, executive director of NOSIDA, on the choice of call sign

In March 2014, the New Orleans Society for Infectious Disease Awareness, formed five years prior to raise HIV/AIDS awareness in the New Orleans area, received a construction permit for a new low-power (LP) FM radio station, which it announced would feature a community format with "programming dedicated to human rights and social justice". The selection of the call letters was intended by its founders to help reduce the stigma surrounding HIV; in 2016, New Orleans had the third-highest HIV infection rate in the United States, attributed to cultural stigmas in the Black community, local laws and high poverty rates.

WHIV-LP began broadcasting on December 1, 2014—World AIDS Day. Originally with a talk-heavy lineup that drew heavily from the Pacifica Radio Network, the station expanded its music programming in 2016 and had 70 different hosts and DJs by 2017.

Originally housed at the Odyssey House drug treatment center, WHIV-LP moved to its own quarters on Orleans Avenue in 2015. Less than a year later, the station suffered major damage in the 2016 Louisiana floods, with several pieces of equipment and furnishings being ruined.

== Other uses of the call letters ==
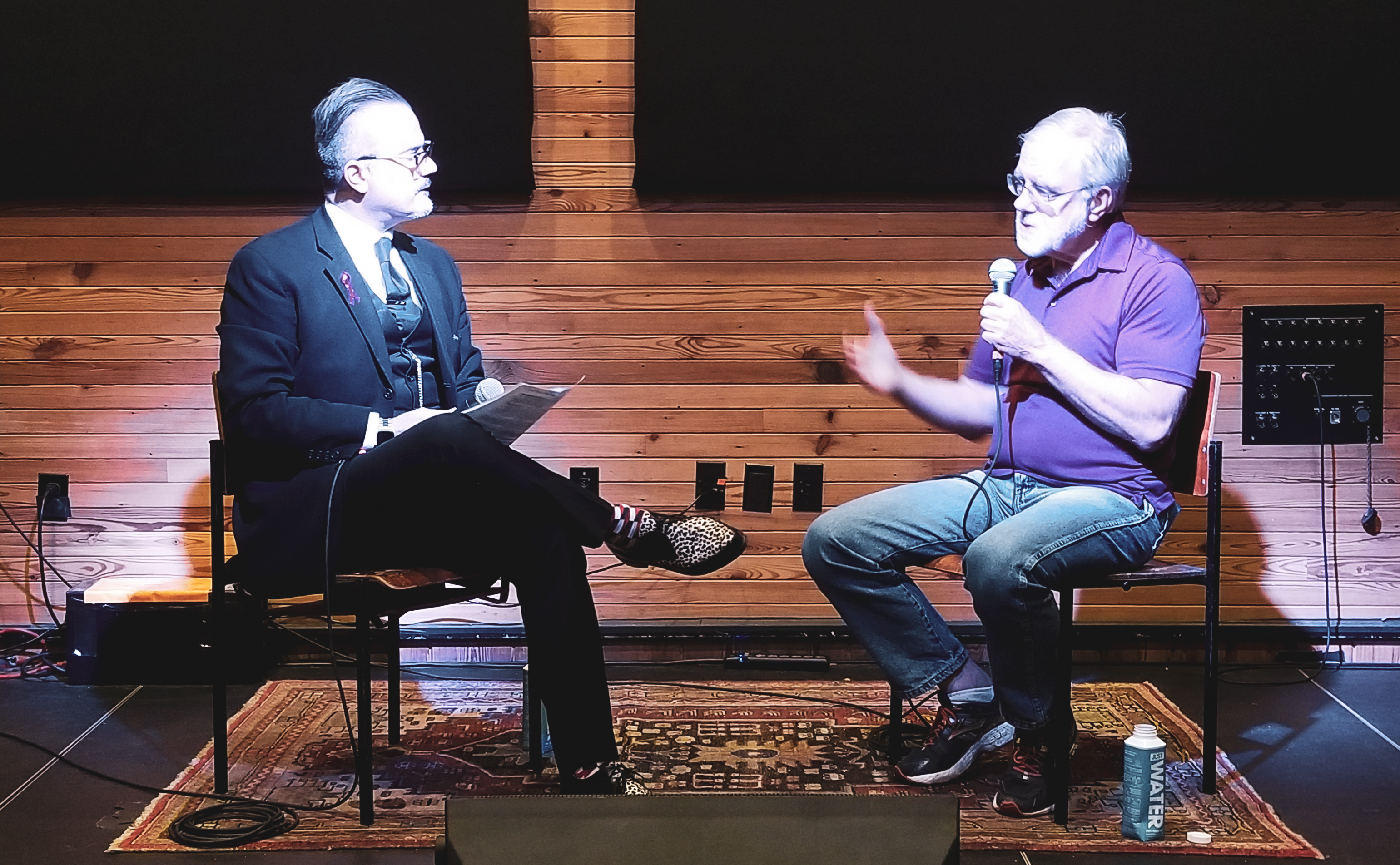
WHIV-LP founder Mark-Alain Dery (left) interviews Green Party presidential candidate Howie Hawkins in 2019.

A fictional radio station named WHIV is mentioned in New Orleans writer Poppy Z. Brite's 1996 novel Exquisite Corpse, though there is no relation to the present station. In that book, WHIV is a pirate radio station on a boat from which an HIV-positive character, Lucas Ransom, broadcasts.
