= Devil You Know =

Devil You Know may refer to:

- "Devil You Know (Boardwalk Empire)", a 2014 episode of the television series Boardwalk Empire
- "Devil You Know" (song), a 1982 single by New Zealand band DD Smash
- Light the Torch, an American heavy metal group formerly known as Devil You Know
- Devil You Know, a novel by Cathy MacPhail, shortlisted for the 2015 Hampshire Book Awards

== See also ==
- The Devil You Know (disambiguation)
