= Courtney Love: The Real Story =

Book by Poppy Z. Brite

- Author: Poppy Z. Brite
- Publisher: Simon & Schuster
- Publication date: 1997
- ISBN: 0-684-84800-7

Courtney Love: The Real Story (ISBN 0-684-84800-7) is a biography of rock musician Courtney Love, written by Poppy Z. Brite. The book, Brite's first full-length work of nonfiction, was published by Simon & Schuster in 1997. Though technically unauthorized, Love actually asked Brite to write the book, according to the biographer.
