= Plastic Jesus (novella) =

2000 novel by Poppy Z. Brite

- First edition cover Cover art by Mary Fleener
- Author: Poppy Z. Brite
- Publisher: Subterranean Press
- Publication date: October 15, 2000
- Pages: 105
- ISBN: 1-892284-73-1

"Plastic Jesus" is a novella by American writer Poppy Z. Brite, published by Subterranean Press in 2000. The story concerns Seth Grealy and Peyton Masters, frontmen of the rock and roll band The Kydds. Seth and Peyton fall deeply in love, and publicly come out after the Stonewall riots. The relationship helps foster tolerance of homosexuality but leads to a backlash and the dissolution of the band. Years later, Seth is murdered by a homophobe. The story closely parallels the career of The Beatles, with Seth and Peyton standing in for John Lennon and Paul McCartney.

A Beatles fan since his teenage years, Brite initially intended Plastic Jesus as a novel before rewriting it as a novella. He anticipated that the novella's themes might upset some Beatles fans. Plastic Jesus has been classified as a roman à clef, an alternate history, and a slash fiction. The book received mixed reviews from critics.

== Plot ==
In England, aspiring rock musicians Seth Grealy and Peyton Masters meet and form an instant connection. The two form a band with Mark, a bass player and Dennis, a drummer. The group becomes a huge success under the tutelage of their gay manager, Harold Loomis, settling on the name "The Kydds." The band gains a strong female following. Seth writes a song for The Kydds about being "a plastic Jesus in a plastic world."

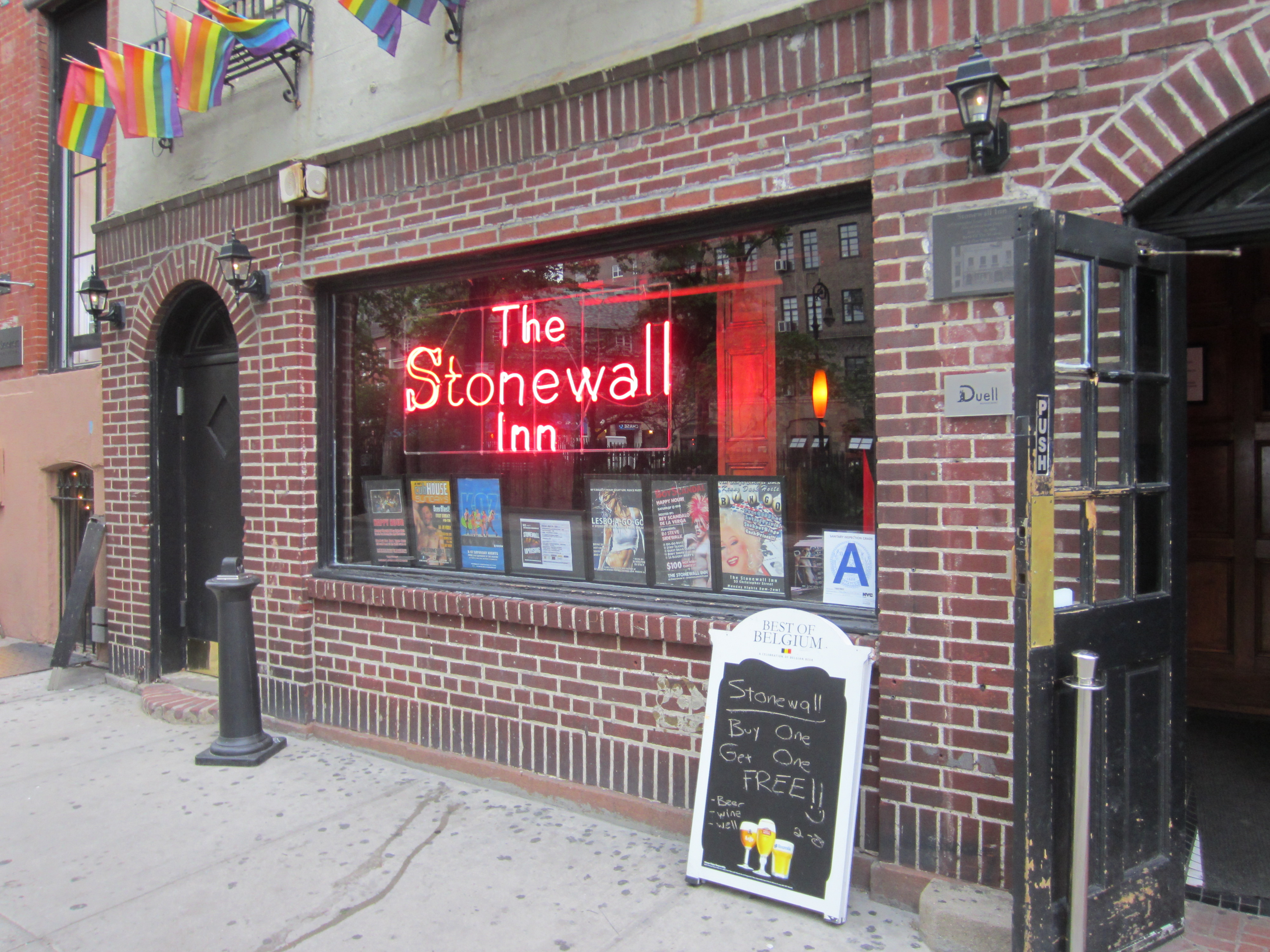
The Stonewall Inn in 2014

Seth, who is bisexual, starts an affair with Harold. Harold is killed by a male prostitute who steals from him. Peyton comforts Seth following the murder and the two have sex. From then on, Seth and Peyton are covertly a couple. Mark and Dennis are fine with this, as they make so much money being part of The Kydds. Seth and Peyton move in together, and Seth watches lots of television.

Seth sees news coverage of drag queens and other young men at the Stonewall riots and decides that he and Peyton should get involved. Peyton is worried this might hurt their careers, but Seth assures him they don't need more money and Peyton acquiesces. The couple arrive at the Stonewall Inn following the riots and give an interview announcing they are a couple. This revelation inspires a backlash, including Southerners burning The Kydds' records, as well as increased tolerance for homosexuality. Mark and Dennis are upset that Seth and Peyton came out and The Kydds disband.

Seth and Peyton move to New York City. They are married in a same-sex wedding by a "renegade" priest in Amsterdam and continue to make music together without Mark and Dennis. After years together as a couple, Seth is shot and killed by a homophobe named Ray Brinker who hated the impact Seth had on the world. After consulting Seth's doctor, Jonathan Pumphry, Peyton is able to speak to Ray. Ray hangs himself shortly thereafter. Peyton tells Jonathan that he thanked Ray for turning Seth into a martyr, as his death would give people courage and "show them that love is worthy dying for."

== Background and genre ==
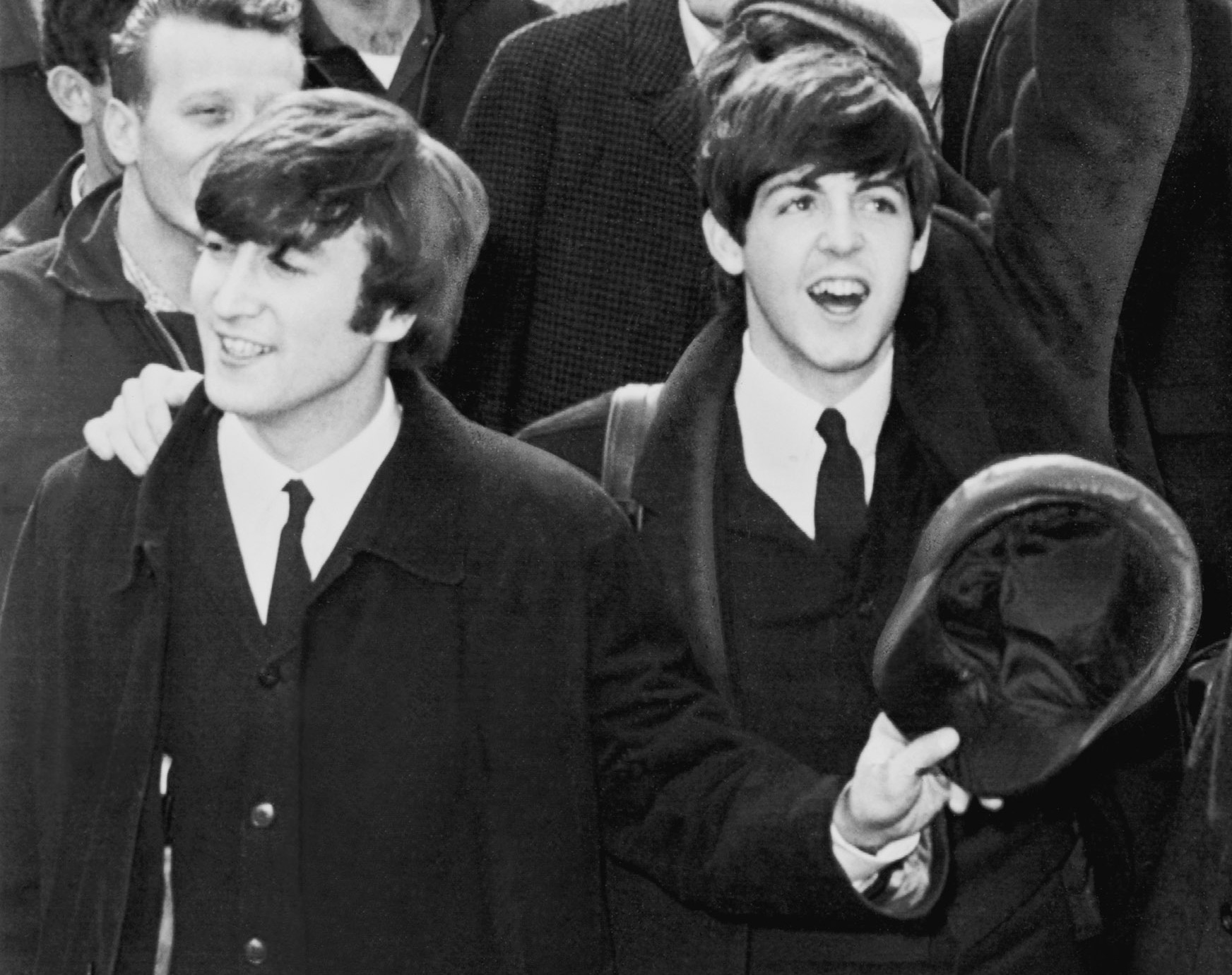
Seth Grealy and Peyton Masters parallel John Lennon and Paul McCartney (pictured in 1964)

Brite was 13 when John Lennon was murdered. Lennon's death "stoked [his] imagination." Afterward, he started buying The Beatles' records and became an obsessed fan of Lennon, which was anomalous in his rural high school in North Carolina during the 1980s. Plastic Jesus was initially intended as Brite's fifth novel, but he disliked much of the material he'd written for it, including "entire characters, subplots, [and] decades." With that in mind, he decided to rework it into a novella. Brite anticipated that some Beatles fans would take issue with the homosexual themes of Plastic Jesus but dismissed that, noting that the band spoke out against prejudice.

Plastic Jesus is a roman à clef, with The Kydds representing The Beatles, Seth Grealy representing John Lennon, Peyton Masters representing Paul McCartney, Mark representing George Harrison, Dennis representing Ringo Starr, and Harold Loomis representing The Beatles' manager Brian Epstein. Brite said "I have always believed the world would be a better place today if John and Paul had been lovers. Yes, I know they weren't gay. That has nothing to do with it. This is a fantasy." Brite described Plastic Jesus as being about "a great '60s band," the Stonewall riots, and gay rights in general, but being first and foremost a love story. Plastic Jesus has also been classified as an alternate history and a slash fiction. Brite noted that, unlike some of his other work, Plastic Jesus featured no supernatural or horror content. Despite this, Locus repeatedly listed Plastic Jesus as a horror title. Brite was happy Locus listed the book, but saddened that he had been pigeonholed as a writer. Plastic Jesus was released as a chapbook illustrated by Brite. Plastic Jesus was released as a trade hardcover book and 600 copies of the novella signed by the author were made available for purchase.

== Critical reception ==
Kirkus Reviews said Plastic Jesus lacked the lyricism and "soaring fantasy" of The Beatles. Deeming Plastic Jesus inferior to Brite's debut, Lost Souls (1992), the publication concluded its review saying "the originals overpower Brite's march of whimsy."

Publishers Weekly said the nostalgic book was overly reverent to Beatlemania, adding that the "warm but slight" novella might have worked better as a full novel.

== Works cited ==
- Brite, Poppy Z. (2000). Plastic Jesus. 345 Hudson Street New York, NY 10014: Subterranean Press. ISBN 978-1-4976-2585-3.
- Siegel, Carol (2005). Goth's Dark Empire. 601 North Morton Street, Bloomington, IN 47404-3797 USA: Indiana University Press. ISBN 0-253-34593-6.
