= The Dry Salvages (novella) =

2004 novel by Caitlín R. Kiernan

- Cover of the 2004 Subterranean Press edition
- Author: Caitlín R. Kiernan
- Language: English
- Publisher: Subterranean Press
- Publication date: 2004

The Dry Salvages is a futuristic science fiction story of novella length by American writer Caitlín R. Kiernan, published in 2004 as a stand-alone hardback volume by Subterranean Press.

== Plot ==
The story consists of two parallel narratives, one set in the novella's present-day (early 24th-Century Paris) and the other in the novel's past (the 23rd Century). Told as a first-person narrative, the story is being written down with three antique ballpoint pens by Audrey Cather, an exopaleontologist and the lone survivor of an ill-fated mission to an extrasolar planet, Cecrops, a gas giant orbiting the low-mass red dwarf star Gliese 876. The Montelius mission included two other human astronauts, Peter Connor (also a paleontologist) and Joakim Hamilton (a biologist), and one parahuman astronaut, Umachandra Murdin (a computer scientist), along with a number of androids. Its object was to investigate evidence of an extraterrestrial civilization which had long ago mined Piros, a moon of Cecrops. A blend of dystopian science fiction, Lovecraftian horror, and cyberpunk, along with elements of space opera, the novella paints a grim view of the future and of interstellar travel and alien contact. Earth has been ravaged by war, pollution, and violent climatic changes, and the menacing intelligence the crew of the Montelius (and its predecessor, the Gilgamesh) discover on Piros leads to a government cover-up. The author uses Audrey Cather's three reconditioned ballpoint pens as a literary device, dividing the story into three sections, "The First Pen", "The Second Pen", and "The Third (and Final) Pen". The Dry Salvages provides an example of an unreliable narrator, as Audrey Cather continually makes mistakes and contradicts herself regarding events aboard the Montelius.

The cover art was provided by Ryan Obermeyer. Kiernan's title is a reference to T. S. Eliot's poem of the same name.
