= To Charles Fort, with Love =

Short stories by Caitlin R. Kiernan

Cover art by Ryan Obermeyer

To Charles Fort, With Love is a short story collection by American fantasist Caitlin R. Kiernan, published by Subterranean Press in 2005. As the author explains in the preface, many of these stories were inspired by the writings of Charles Fort (1874-1932), and many of them have a Lovecraftian flavor. Two of the stories have received the International Horror Guild Award: "Onion" (Best Short Fiction, 2001) and "La Peau Verte" (Best Mid-Length Fiction, 2005). Also, "La Peau Verte" and the collection as a whole were both nominated for the World Fantasy Award (2005). As with Kiernan's earlier short-story collections, the book is illustrated by Canadian artist Richard A. Kirk, and the cover art is provided by Ryan Obermeyer. An afterword, "A Certain Inexplicability," was provided by Ramsey Campbell.

== Contents ==
- Preface - "Looking for Innsmouth"
- "Valentia"
- "Spindleshanks (New Orleans, 1956)"
- "So Runs the World Away"
- "Standing Water"
- "La Mer des Rêves"
- "The Road of Pins"
- "Onion"
- "Apokatastasis"
- "La Peau Verte"
- "The Dead and the Moonstruck"
- The Dandridge Cycle:

- "A Redress for Andromeda"
- "Nor the Demons Down Under the Sea"
- "Andromeda Among the Stones"

- Afterword: "A Certain Inexplicability" (by Ramsey Campbell)
