= Wormwood (short story collection) =

1993 short story collection by Poppy Z. Brite

Wormwood: A Collection of Stories (originally titled Swamp Foetus)
- First edition cover (original title)
- Author: Poppy Z. Brite
- Illustrator: Rick Lieder
- Language: English
- Genre: Horror fiction; Splatterpunk; Short stories
- Publisher: Borderlands Press
- Publication date: 1993
- Publication place: United States

Wormwood, originally published as Swamp Foetus, is a collection of short stories by American horror fiction author Poppy Z. Brite. It was first published by Borderlands Press, a small-press publisher of horror fiction, in 1993. It was reprinted by Penguin Books in 1995, and reprinted and retitled in 1996 by Dell Publishing.

== Contents ==
- "A Prolegomena to Any Future Metaphysics of Poppy", introduction by Dan Simmons
- "Angels"
- "A Georgia Story"
- "His Mouth Will Taste of Wormwood"
- "Optional Music for Voice and Piano"
- "Xenophobia"
- "The Sixth Sentinel"
- "Missing"
- "Footprints in the Water"
- "How to Get Ahead in New York"
- "Calcutta, Lord of Nerves" (1993 World Fantasy Award nominee, Best Short Fiction)
- "The Elder"
- "The Ash of Memory, the Dust of Desire" (1991 Bram Stoker Award nominee, Best Short Fiction)

== Selected edition ==
His Mouth Will Taste of Wormwood and Other Stories (Penguin Books, 1995, 96 pages, ISBN 978-0146000508) comprises four stories selected from Swamp Foetus (aka Wormwood): "His Mouth Will Taste of Wormwood", "The Sixth Sentinel", "Calcutta, Lord of Nerves", and "How To Get Ahead in New York".
