= Liquor (novel series) =

2004 novel series by Poppy Z. Brite

Liquor, a novel
- First edition cover
- Author: Poppy Z. Brite
- Language: English
- Series: Liquor novels
- Genre: Thriller, suspense
- Published: March 2004 Three Rivers Press
- Publication place: United States
- Media type: Print (Paperback)
- Pages: 352 (first edition, paperback)
- ISBN: 978-1-4000-5007-9 (first edition, paperback)
- OCLC: 52822528
- Dewey Decimal: 813/.54 22
- LC Class: PS3552.R4967 L57 2004

Soul Kitchen
- Author: Poppy Z. Brite
- Language: English
- Series: Liquor novels
- Genre: Fiction novel
- Published: 2006 Three Rivers Press
- Publication place: United States
- ISBN: 0-307-23765-6 (Paperback)
- OCLC: 64065933
- Dewey Decimal: 813/.54 22
- LC Class: PS3552.R4967 S68 2006

The Liquor novel series is a novel series by Poppy Z. Brite. The books are linked by common characters and the setting, a New Orleans restaurant where "the potboiler meets the saucier". The series revolves around the two young chefs John Rickey and Gary "G-man" Stubbs, their restaurant and their life in New Orleans.

== Series titles ==
- The Value of X (2002) (prequel) ISBN 978-1931081672
- Liquor (2004) ISBN 978-1400050079
- Prime (2005) ISBN 978-1400050086
- Soul Kitchen (2006) ISBN 978-0307237651

In addition, Brite calls 2007's D*U*C*K (ISBN 978-1596060760) "a Liquor-related novella."

Liquor is the first novel in the series. It was released in the United States on March 16, 2004.

Soul Kitchen is the third novel in the series. It was released in the United States on July 25, 2006. It is 345 pages long.
