= A Is for Alien =

2009 short story collection by Caitlín R. Kiernan

- Author: Caitlín R. Kiernan
- Illustrator: Vince Locke
- Cover artist: Jacek Yerka
- Language: English
- Genre: Science fiction short story collection
- Publisher: Subterranean Press
- Publication date: 2009
- Publication place: United States
- Media type: Print (hardcover)
- Pages: 213 pp
- ISBN: 9781596062092
- OCLC: 228364380

A Is for Alien is Caitlín R. Kiernan's fifth short story collection, her first devoted entirely to her science fiction work. It was published by Subterranean Press in 2009. Cover art was provided by Jacek Yerka, and interior illustrations by Vince Locke. The book closes with an afterword by Elizabeth Bear. "'Ode' to Katan Amano" originally appeared in Kiernan's 2005 collection of "weird erotica", Frog Toes and Tentacles. "A Season of Broken Dolls" and "In View of Nothing" originally appeared in Kiernan's Sirenia Digest, issues 15 and 16 respectively.

== Contents ==
- "Riding the White Bull"
- "Faces in Revolving Souls"
- "Zero Summer"
- "The Pearl Diver"
- "In View of Nothing"
- "Ode to Katan Amano"
- "A Season of Broken Dolls"
- "Bradbury Weather"
- Afterword by Elizabeth Bear
