= The Drowning Girl =

2012 novel by Caitlín R. Kiernan

The Drowning Girl: A Memoir
- 2012 Penguin 1st ed. paperback
- Author: Caitlín R. Kiernan
- Language: English
- Genre: Science fiction, dark fantasy
- Set in: Providence, Rhode Island
- Publisher: Roc Books (Penguin)
- Publication date: June 3, 2012
- Publication place: United States
- Media type: Paperback
- Pages: 336 pp. (1st pb)
- Awards: Tiptree (2012); Stoker—Novel (2012)
- ISBN: 9780451464163 (1st pb)
- OCLC: 727703192
- Dewey Decimal: 813/.54
- LC Class: PS3561.I358 D76 2012
- Preceded by: The Red Tree
- Followed by: Blood Oranges

The Drowning Girl: A Memoir is a 2012 dark fantasy novel by American writer Caitlín R. Kiernan, set in Providence, Rhode Island. The story's protagonist and unreliable narrator, India Morgan Phelps (also known as Imp), has schizophrenia.

It has been described as an "eerie masterpiece of literary horror and dark fantasy" containing elements of magical realism. It has also been described as semi-autobiographical. The novel has been translated into a number of languages, including French, German, Polish, Portuguese, Spanish, Romanian, and Turkish.

== Synopsis ==
The Drowning Girl follows the story of India Morgan Phelps, an unreliable narrator struggling with hereditary mental illness. India states that she has decided to write down the bizarre events that occurred two years ago (the entirety of the novel is written as a fictionalized memoir). Early in the novel, she befriends her eventual roommate and lover, a transgender woman named Abalyn Armitage. India works at an art supply store, but she is also a painter and a writer.

One night, India picks up a hitchhiker named Eva Canning, whom she finds stranded and naked on the side of the road, although India is unable to pinpoint whether she met Eva in July or November. Eva stays with India only for a short while (much to Abalyn's chagrin) before the mysterious woman takes off on her own, but apparently continues to stalk India. This sparks India's obsession with Canning and her past. India's obsession eventually causes Abalyn to leave her.

India often deals with traumatic events by writing short stories. Some of them relate to Eva Canning, while others revolve around mysterious artists Phillip George Saltonstall and Albert Perrault, as well as a painting titled "The Drowning Girl," which India saw on display at a museum as a child.

After running into Abalyn and her new girlfriend, India begins to lose her grasp on what is real and what isn't. As a result of her inability to tell fact from fiction, her growing obsession with Eva Canning, and Abalyn's abandonment, India suffers a mental breakdown. India stops taking her medication, stops eating, and neglects phone calls from concerned people such as Abalyn, her therapist, her boss (who fires her), and her aunt. India begins to paint and write obsessively until Abalyn finds her half-dead in her apartment.

With the help of Abalyn, India discovers that Eva Canning's mother (also named Eva) was part of a cult led by a woman known as Jacova Anjevine, who committed mass suicide with her followers by walking into the sea some years prior. Eva was apparently the only survivor of said mass suicide. India believes that Eva might be a ghost or a sea-dwelling creature of some sort in a human disguise, but the story is vague as to whether India actually encounters any supernatural phenomena.

India eventually does meet Eva Canning, and the two have a bizarre sexual encounter during which Canning appears to morph into a fish-like creature. Eva confesses to India that she wishes to go to the sea to be with her mother, which India obliges by taking her to the beach, at which point Eva walks into the water. India sits on the shore for a long time.

India reunites with Abalyn, and it is implied they are still together at the end of the novel. Eva's body washes up on the shore sometime after.

== Critical response ==
At the time of release, mainstream critics praised the novel. Publishers Weekly bestowed it a starred review and called it "finely crafted" in the first sentence of the assessment, and then concluded at the end that "Kiernan evokes the gripping and resonant work of Shirley Jackson in a haunting story that's half a mad artist's diary and half fairy tale." At Tor.com, a reviewer admitted that they might not be able to do the novel justice, due to how dimensional the novel is, that "The Drowning Girl: A Memoir is not an easy novel, but it rewards tenfold the effort and engagement of the reader who is willing to put in the work." They later relate that "the intricacies... would be entirely impossible without Kiernan's rich, intense, spot-on perfect prose;" and "it's challenging to encompass in words how brilliant of a book this is." Booklist was positive too.

Not every reviewer fell for it totally, though. At SFFWorld, "settling down into the novel is not an easy task." Narrative choices Kiernan makes aren't ones with which I can find fault; however, I wasn't able to fully connect with the story she was telling. I think that was part of the plan on Kiernan's part, too. I appreciate the work and complexity of the novel, but the narrative isn't something I found myself being connected with or drawn back to reading. In short, [it's] a book that, when I step away from [it], has plenty of things [I] admire, but one that ultimately didn't work for me."

Since, writers have opined on this novel as a modern classic that's ambitious and nearly flawless. Lucy A. Snyder, for instance, wrote about it, and began by saying that, considering it had been nominated by so many award, it was "quite good" to justify that reaction. She struggled to write about what made it so great, because there were too many things to talk about: "Trying to pick just one thing to focus on in my review was difficult, partly because it was like trying to pick the most valuable gold coin in a whole room full of dragon's loot, and partly because trying to separate everything out in this complex narrative is like trying to pull a single live octopus from an entire bucket of octopi...". In a review for Strange Horizons, Niall Alexander agreed, calling the novel Kiernan's "most ambitious long-form fiction [up to 2012], and its successes are multifarious, its failures truly few."

== Awards ==
Awards and Nominations
Year	Award	Category	Result	Ref
2012	Bram Stoker Award	Novel	Won	
2012	James Tiptree, Jr. Award	—	Won	
2013	British Fantasy Award	Novel	Shortlisted	
2013	Locus Award	Fantasy Novel	Nominated—2nd	
2013	Mythopoeic Award	Adult Literature	Shortlisted	
2013	Nebula Award	Novel	Shortlisted	
2013	Shirley Jackson Award	Novel	Shortlisted	
2013	World Fantasy Award	Novel	Shortlisted	
