= From Weird and Distant Shores =

2002 short story collection by Caitlin R. Kiernan

- First edition, cover art by Bob Eggleton
- Author: Caitlin R. Kiernan
- Illustrator: Richard A. Kirk
- Cover artist: Bob Eggleton
- Language: English
- Genre: Fantasy
- Publisher: Subterranean Press
- Publication date: 2002
- Publication place: United States
- Media type: Print
- Pages: 234 p.
- ISBN: 9781931081276
- OCLC: 48972450

From Weird and Distant Shores is American fantasist Caitlin R. Kiernan's second solo short-story collection, released by Subterranean Press in 2002. As with her first collection, Tales of Pain and Wonder, interior illustrations were supplied by Canadian artist Richard A. Kirk. The book includes thirteen stories (horror, science fiction, and fantasy), including a collaboration with Poppy Z. Brite and another with Christa Faust. As Kiernan explains in the collection's introduction, most of these stories were originally written for "'shared world' and 'theme' anthologies," books wherein the authors have been asked to write stories set in the worlds of other authors or stories pertaining to some particular subject, respectively. The collection is notable in that includes Kiernan's earliest published short story, "Persephone." Kiernan provides an afterword for each story.

== Contents ==
†	Appears in the lettered edition only

- Preface - "Playing God in Other People's Sandboxes"
- "Escape Artist"
- "The Comedy of St. Jehanne d' Arc"
- "Stoker's Mistress"
- "Emptiness Spoke Eloquent"
- "Giants in the Earth"
- "Found Angels" (with Christa Faust)
- "Two Worlds, and in Between"
- "The King of Birds"
- "By Turns"
- "Persephone"
- "Between the Flatirons and the Deep Green Sea"
- "Hoar Isis"
- "Night Story 1973" (with Poppy Z. Brite)
- "Rat's Star (A Fragment)" ^{†}
