= The Devil You Know (short story collection) =

2003 short story collection by Poppy Z. Brite

- First edition cover Cover art by Alan M. Clark
- Author: Poppy Z. Brite
- Publisher: Subterranean Press
- Publication date: 2003
- ISBN: 978-1-931081-72-6

The Devil You Know is a collection of short stories by American author Poppy Z. Brite published in 2003 by Subterranean Press.

== Stories ==
- "Dispatches from Tanganyika: A Foreword"
- "The Devil You Know"
- "Oh Death, Where Is Thy Spatula? (A Dr. Brite story)"
- "Lantern Marsh"
- "Nothing of Him That Doth Fade"
- "The Ocean"
- "Marisol (A Dr. Brite story)"
- "Poivre"
- "Pansu"
- "Burn, Baby, Burn"
- "System Freeze"
- "Bayou de la Mère"
- "The Heart of New Orleans (A Dr. Brite story)"
- "A Season in Heck"

== Reception ==
Publishers Weekly describes the book as follows: "Abandoning past gothic trappings and using a cleaner, simpler style, Brite emerges as a writer of honesty and wit."
