= The Ammonite Violin & Others =

First edition

The Ammonite Violin & Others is Caitlin R. Kiernan's sixth short story collection. The twenty stories included first appeared in issues 1-23 of Sirenia Digest, Kiernan's monthly digest of weird and dark fiction. It was published by Subterranean Press in July, 2010. The cover features an illustration by Richard A. Kirk, who has provided artwork for several of Kiernan's other collections. Jeff VanderMeer wrote the introduction. The collection was nominated for both the World Fantasy Award and Shirley Jackson Award, and appeared on the cover of Publishers Weekly.

"A Child’s Guide to the Hollow Hills" and "The Hole With a Girl In Its Heart" originally appeared as "Untitled 23" and "Untitled 26," respectively.

== Contents ==
Introduction by Jeff VanderMeer

- "Madonna Littoralis"
- "Orpheus at Mount Pangeum"
- "Bridle"
- "For One Who Has Lost Herself"
- "Ode to Edvard Munch"
- "The Cryomancer’s Daughter (Murder Ballad No. 3)"
- "A Child’s Guide to the Hollow Hills"
- "The Ammonite Violin (Murder Ballad No. 4)"
- "The Lovesong of Lady Ratteanrufer"
- "Metamorphosis A"
- "The Sphinx’s Kiss"
- "The Voyeur in the House of Glass"
- "Metamorphosis B"
- "Skin Game"
- "The Hole With a Girl In Its Heart"
- "Outside the Gates of Eden"
- "In the Dreamtime of Lady Resurrection"
- "Anamnesis, or the Sleepless Nights of Léon Spilliaert"
- "Scene in the Museum (1896)"
- "The Madam of the Narrow Houses"
