= Drawing Blood =

1993 novel by Poppy Z. Brite

- First edition
- Author: Poppy Z. Brite
- Cover artist: Miran Kim
- Language: English
- Genre: Horror
- Publisher: Delacorte Press
- Publication date: 1993
- Publication place: United States
- Pages: 373
- ISBN: 0-385-30895-7
- OCLC: 31368685

Drawing Blood is a 1993 horror novel by American writer Poppy Z. Brite. Something of a haunted house tale, the novel was originally titled Birdland but the publisher retitled it to make a thin connection to Brite's first novel, Lost Souls, a vampire tale.

== Synopsis ==
The novel concerns Trevor McGee, a comic book artist and sole survivor of a family murder-suicide, and Zachary Bosch, a bisexual hacker, and their arrival at McGee's old family home in Missing Mile, North Carolina, a fictional town featured in Brite's previous novel, Lost Souls.

Twenty-five-year-old Trevor McGee is haunted by an event in his past in which his underground artist father, Bobby, brutally murdered Trevor's mother and younger brother with a hammer before killing himself, leaving Trevor alive. Young Trevor was placed in an unhappy state home, where he discovered his own talent for drawing but remained alone, obsessed with the question of why he was allowed to live. Now as an adult, he travels back to Missing Mile, North Carolina, to search for answers in the abandoned house where the murders took place.

In New Orleans, Zachary Bosch is a nineteen-year-old computer hacker on the run from the law after his online misdeeds attract the notice of the FBI. Traveling through the South, he too finds himself in Missing Mile, where he meets and falls in love with Trevor. The two young men slowly become more entwined, even as Zach starts to questions Trevor's grip on reality. Their love affair culminates when one night, while tripping on psilocybin mushrooms, Trevor has an out-of-body experience where he is propelled into the past and speaks to his father on the night of the murders. He realizes that somehow the presence of his adult self in the past caused his father to spare the life of five-year-old Trevor, meaning that he is the cause of his own endless quest. Upon waking, Trevor attempts to murder Zach, but Zach manages to talk him down until Trevor breaks his own drawing hand in order to keep himself from harming Zach.

Back in New Orleans, Zach's friend Eddy has figured out Zach's location based on clues Zach planted for her in the local newspaper. Realizing that the FBI must have done the same, she races to North Carolina to warn Zach that the police are in town searching for him. Trevor offers to go on the run with Zach. Their friends in Missing Mile help smuggle the two lovers out of town where they board a private aircraft to Jamaica. Finally safe, they begin a new life together.

The characters Trevor and Zachary reappear in Brite's short story "Vine of the Soul", published in 1998 in Disco 2000, edited by Sarah Champion.

== Collectibles ==
When a man set himself on fire in the Los Angeles, California location of a commercial mailbox company, copies of this novel were saturated with the smell of burnt flesh. They were sold by book dealer Barry R. Levin as collectibles.
