= Lost Souls (Brite novel) =

1992 novel by Poppy Z. Brite

- First edition
- Author: Poppy Z. Brite
- Cover artist: Miran Kim
- Language: English
- Genre: Horror
- Publisher: Delacorte Press
- Publication date: 1992
- Publication place: United States
- Media type: Print (Hardcover)
- Pages: 359 p.
- ISBN: 0-385-30875-2
- OCLC: 25869401
- Dewey Decimal: 813/.54 20
- LC Class: PS3552.R4967 L67 1992

Lost Souls is a 1992 horror novel by American writer Poppy Z. Brite, his debut novel. It is the only novel-length adventure of Brite's 'Steve and Ghost' characters, popularized in numerous short stories. The novel is an extended version of the short story "The Seed of Lost Souls".

Several characters introduced in the novel make appearances in Brite's second novel, Drawing Blood, though it is not a direct sequel.

== Plot ==
Fifteen years ago, in a bar in New Orleans run by a centuries-old vampire named Christian, fifteen-year-old Jessy is seduced, impregnated, and abandoned by a charismatic and dangerous vampire named Zillah, leader of his own small nomadic vampire coven. Due to the nature of vampiric birth, in which the fetus devours its mother from within, Jessy dies in childbirth. Christian names the male infant Nothing and leaves him on a stranger's doorstep in Maryland in hopes that the child will be able to live a normal life.

Fifteen years later, the child—now called Jason by his adoptive parents—finds himself alienated from his parents and his peers. His only solace is an indie musical duo called Lost Souls?, with whom he feels a deep connection. Jason discovers the note Christian attached to his basket on the night he was abandoned and pieces together his history. Rechristening himself "Nothing", he runs away from home and is soon picked up by Zillah and his coven, who recognize Nothing's vampiric nature while being unaware that he is Zillah's biological child. The coven agrees to take Nothing to Missing Mile, North Carolina, to see Lost Souls? perform. Along the way, Zillah and Nothing develop a sexual relationship.

Meanwhile, Jessy's father, who has spent the intervening years attempting to learn his daughter's fate, confronts Christian at his bar, believing that he murdered Jessy. Christian flees New Orleans and arrives at Missing Mile. While in town, he starts working as a bartender at The Sacred Yew, a local bar in which Lost Souls? performs regularly. Lost Souls? consists of Steve Finn and his childhood best friend Ghost. Ghost is clairvoyant and has sensed danger approaching Missing Mile. Steve has recently broken up with his long-time girlfriend Ann after sexually assaulting her.

On the night of the concert, Steve and Ghost come into direct confrontation with Zillah's coven, ending in a fight. Ghost senses Nothing's inner conflict and wishes to save him from Zillah. The coven also reconnects with Christian, who informs them of Nothing and Zillah's kinship. Zillah is delighted by the news, which forges a deeper bond between the two. Zillah, meanwhile, seduces Ann, leaving her pregnant before leaving Missing Mile.

Ann becomes obsessed with reuniting with Zillah and follows the coven to New Orleans, while Steve and Ghost set off in pursuit of her. Jessy's father returns to Christian's derelict bar and meets Nothing, recognizing him as Jessy's offspring. He realizes his grandson is a vampire and attacks him, but the other vampires rescue Nothing and feed upon Jessy's father, unaware that he is dying from cancer. His toxic blood leaves the coven immobilized with illness.

Arriving in New Orleans, Steve and Ghost meet a local magician named Arkady, who offers the band guidance. He reveals two vampires are living under his roof, but these are a different kind that feed on life energy instead of blood. The magician then offers to perform an abortion to save Ann's life, for the price of sex with the virginal Ghost. Steve refuses to allow this, and Arkady gives in, deciding to help them. Steve and Ghost locate Ann wandering the city, and Arkady performs the abortion with magical ingredients. Shortly after this, while Steve and Ghost are out in the streets, the two vampires living under Arkady's roof choose this moment to drain him.

Steve and Ghost return to find both Ann and Arkady dead, the procedure failing and killing Ann and the unborn child. Enraged, Steve decides to destroy Zillah and his coven. Finding the vampires still weakened, Steve and Ghost kill Zillah and Christian, but Nothing persuades Ghost to spare him and the two surviving members of the coven, promising that they will not seek revenge. Steve and Ghost return to Missing Mile and attempt to rebuild their lives after the supernatural horror they have witnessed.

In an epilogue set fifty years in the future, it is revealed that Nothing and his coven are still together, having formed a rock band.

== Characters ==
=== Steve Finn ===
Steve was raised in Missing Mile, North Carolina. He is the guitar player for Lost Souls? and works in a record shop in his home town called the Whirling Disc. He is described as tall and wiry, with a hawkish nose, and long black hair he rarely washes. Steve is proud and stubborn, drinks to excess, and is prone to violent outbursts. He is haunted throughout the novel by the memory of his relationship with his ex-girlfriend Ann, which he terminated abruptly by raping her on discovery of her infidelity.

=== Ghost ===
Ghost is Lost Souls? singer and also Steve's best friend. Though their relationship throughout the novel often has homoerotic undertones, they do not become lovers until the follow-up story, "Stay Awake". Ghost is described as appearing much like his namesake; very translucent skin, white blond, wispy hair and huge blue eyes. Kind and compassionate, Ghost often has unexplainable visions, and sometimes they are a foreshadowing of things to come.

=== Ann Bransby-Smith ===
Ann is Steve's ex-girlfriend. She has long, red-gold hair and spends most of her time early in the novel fretting about her increasing dislike for her new boyfriend, and her longing for Steve. She is a painter, a tough yet vulnerable character whose strained relations with her father and bitter love for Steve lead her into a series of defiant acts that ultimately undo her. Ann ends up bewitched by Zillah, who gets her pregnant.

=== Jessy Creech ===
A fifteen-year-old girl devoted to the vampiric myth, Jessy stumbles in to the vampires' world not exactly in the manner that she originally would have hoped. She finds employ and board at Christian's Bar due to Christian's sense of responsibility over her predicament. Christian takes care of her during the pregnancy, developing a sexual relationship with the girl.

=== Wallace Creech ===
Jessy's father. He is haunted both by the disappearance of his daughter and by the fact he had sex with the night before she went missing. Wallace confronts Christian fifteen years later, managing to hurt him with a gunshot. Unbeknownst to the vampires, he's dying of cancer, his blood poisonous to Zillah's coven.

=== Arkady Raventon ===
Arkady is the sinister and skeletal proprietor of a magic shop in New Orleans. He is in mourning for his brother Ashley, himself a victim of two less conventional vampires and claims to possess the knowledge and ability to cheat the vampires out of their natural intentions. During his youth, he spent some time in Paris and met Richelle, a seductive vampiress who becomes his companion.

=== Ashley Raventon ===
Arkady's brother, who was murdered by the twins. Arkady preserves his brother's skull in his magic shop.

=== Lost Souls? ===
Steve and Ghost's band. Ghost is the vocalist, and Steve plays guitar. Their music is described as "shitckicker". Lost Souls? has toured across the United States, and they frequently perform at the local club in Missing Mile, North Carolina, a place called The Sacred Yew.

=== Other appearances ===
- "Angels" (printed in Wormwood)
- "The Seed of Lost Souls" (short story of which Lost Souls is an expansion)
- "The South Central Rain Story"
- "Stay Awake"
- "America" (printed in "Are You Loathsome Tonight?)
- "How to Get Ahead in New York" (Wormwood)
- "Con Party at Hotel California" (original first chapter for the unfinished novel that would be the sequel to Lost Souls)

=== Vampires ===
The vampires of this novel are quite dissimilar to those of traditional lore. Rather than being transformed humans, they are a separate species who are born vampires. While most feed on blood, some find alternative sustenance (e.g., love and beauty). There are also distinct differences between older and younger vampires. Older vampires have naturally sharp teeth, are sensitive to sunlight, and cannot eat or drink. Younger vampires have normal human teeth that must be filed, are insensitive to sunlight, and can both eat and drink (as demonstrated by Zillah's group's liking for chartreuse). Brite's vampires also seem to lack many supernatural powers beyond quick healing, heightened sense, and abnormal strength. They can be killed if the heart or brain is destroyed. Female vampires can also be killed by childbirth because vampiric infants kill their mothers in the womb.

=== Nothing (Formerly Jason, née Nothing) ===
A teenage vampire taken in by humans as a baby. Born in New Orleans, he was taken by Christian to a small town in Maryland after he was born and left on the doorstep of an unsuspecting couple. The story is centered around him and his journey to find his real family. Nothing's name means that he is a blank slate, and can write anything down on it he wants to, making himself whatever he wants.

=== Zillah ===
Zillah is Nothing's father as well as his lover. His distinguishing features include his crazy green eyes and the purple, green, and gold-dyed streaks in his hair - the colors of Mardi Gras. He is described as being incredibly beautiful - androgynous, slender, and shorter than Molochai and Twig, with pierced nipples and sharp, black-lacquered nails. He is portrayed throughout the novel as cruel, insensitive, and violent (sexually and otherwise), but he displays fondness for Nothing.

=== Twig and Molochai ===
Zillah's gluttonous companions and twin brothers, both very much alike. They are rarely found apart from one another. Twig is the taller of the two, he has sharp features and wicked demeanor. Twig also drives the trio's van around the country. Molochai is slightly shorter, with roundish, babyish features. He favors sweets and cakes to the other's more adult tastes. There is no explanation of how the two found each other yet there is an account of their first encounter with Zillah whereupon they misjudge his true nature and attack him. They are easily overpowered by the older and more experienced vampire and thereafter act under his supervision.

=== Christian ===
Bartender in New Orleans who looks after Nothing's mother, Jessy, through the duration of her pregnancy, and the one responsible for taking him away from the city after his birth. Christian finds himself almost on the side of the humans, and sometimes the lone voice of wisdom in the vampires' "family". He is the oldest vampire in the novel, being 383 years old. He is also the most isolated character in the novel, perhaps because of his age. Christian has real fangs rather than sharpened teeth and is the only vampire in the novel that cannot consume human food and drink: he must survive solely on blood. He is also the only one intolerant to sunlight, though he can move about in the day if he keeps his skin and eyes completely covered.

=== The Twins ===
Vampire twins that feed on life energy instead of blood. They have murdered Ashley and now live under Arkady's roof, waiting for the right time to feed on him. Described as dilettantes, they perform in a gothic rock band as singers. Ghost is sensible to their presence, dreaming of them during the course of the novel.
