= Alabaster (short story collection) =

- Author: Caitlín R. Kiernan
- Cover artist: Ted Naifeh
- Language: English
- Genre: dark fantasy/science fiction
- Publisher: Subterranean Press
- Publication date: August 2006
- Publication place: United States
- Media type: Print (hardcover)
- ISBN: 978-1-59606-060-9

Alabaster is a dark fantasy and science fiction collection by American writer Caitlin R. Kiernan. It consists of five stories concerning the misadventures of Dancy Flammarion, the albino girl and monster hunter who first appeared in Kiernan's 2001 novel, Threshold. The tales follow Dancy from her childhood in the backwoods and swamps of the Florida panhandle to her teenage duels with strange and murderous creatures in south Georgia. Haunted by a being which may or may not be an angel, Dancy is driven from one encounter to the next, gradually beginning to doubt the nature of her quest. All of these stories occur before the events of Threshold. Released by Subterranean Press, the book is illustrated by Ted Naifeh. The collection was released with a chapbook containing a sixth Dancy Flammarion story, "Highway 97." The book's afterword, "On the Road to Jefferson," was originally released as a chapbook by Subterranean Press in 2002 to accompany the hardcover edition of "Les Fleurs Empoisonnées," titled In the Garden of Poisonous Flowers.

In 2009, Subterranean Press released a trade paperback edition of the collection through its now defunct Far Territories imprint. In February 2014, Dark Horse Books released a new and expanded second edition of Alabaster, with a new author's preface and "Highway 97," a Dancy Flammarion story that had, until then, been available only as a Subterranean Press chapbook. Both paperback editions include the original Ted Naifeh artwork. The Dark Horse edition includes a new cover by Greg Ruth.

== Contents (First Edition) ==
- Author's Preface
  - "Les Fleurs Empoisonnées"
  - "The Well of Stars and Shadow"
  - "Waycross"
  - "Alabaster"
  - "Bainbridge"
- Afterword: "On the Road to Jefferson"
