= Poppy Z. Brite =

American author (born 1967)

William J. Martin
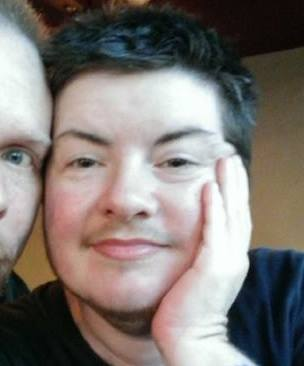
- Martin in 2014
- Born: May 25, 1967 (age 59); Bowling Green, Kentucky, U.S.
- Occupation: Author
- Writing career
- Period: 1985–2010, 2018–present
- Genres: Gothic horror; Southern gothic; Black comedy; Dark fantasy; Splatterpunk
- Notable works: Lost Souls (1992); Drawing Blood (1993); Exquisite Corpse (1996); The Value of X (2002); Liquor (2004); Prime (2005); Soul Kitchen (2006)
- Website: www.poppyzbrite.com

William Joseph Martin (born May 25, 1967), formerly Poppy Z. Brite, is an American author. He initially achieved fame in the gothic horror genre of literature in the early 1990s by publishing a string of successful novels and short story collections. He is best known for his novels Lost Souls (1992), Drawing Blood (1993), and Exquisite Corpse (1996). His later work moved into the genre of dark comedy, with many stories set in the New Orleans restaurant world. Martin's novels are typically standalone books but may feature recurring characters from previous novels and short stories. Much of his work features openly bisexual and gay characters.

== Career ==
Martin is best known for writing gothic and horror novels and short stories. His trademarks include featuring gay men as main characters, graphic sexual descriptions, and an often wry treatment of gruesome events. Some of Martin's better known novels include Lost Souls (1992), Drawing Blood (1993), and the controversial serial killer novel Exquisite Corpse (1996); he has also released the short fiction collections Wormwood (originally published as Swamp Foetus; 1993), Are You Loathsome Tonight? (also published as Self-Made Man; 1998), Wrong Things (with Caitlín R. Kiernan; 2001), and The Devil You Know (2003). His "Calcutta: Lord of Nerves" was selected to represent the year 1992 in the story anthology The Century's Best Horror Fiction.

In a 1998 interview, in response to a comment that "Growing up in the American South [shaped him] as a writer", Martin mentioned that Southern writers Carson McCullers, Truman Capote, Tennessee Williams, Flannery O'Connor, Harper Lee, Thomas Wolfe and William Faulkner also influenced his writing. Answering a follow-up question about his literary influences, he also included "Bradbury, Nabokov, W.S. Burroughs, Stephen King, Ramsey Campbell, Shirley Jackson, Thomas Ligotti, Kathe Koja, Dennis Cooper, Dorothy Parker, Dylan Thomas, Harlan Ellison, Peter Straub, Paul Theroux, Baudelaire, Poe, Lovecraft, John Lennon... I could rattle off ten or twenty more easily; they're all in there somewhere."

Martin wrote Courtney Love: The Real Story (1997), a biography of singer Courtney Love. It was officially "unauthorized", but he acknowledged that the work was done at Love's suggestion and with her cooperation, including access to her personal journal and letters.

In the late 1990s and early 2000s, Martin moved away from horror fiction and gothic themes while still writing about gay characters. The critically acclaimed Liquor novels—Liquor (2004), Prime (2005), and Soul Kitchen (2006)—are dark comedies set in the New Orleans restaurant world. The Value of X (2002) depicts the beginning of the careers of the protagonists of the Liquor series—Gary "G-Man" Stubbs and John "Rickey" Rickey; other stories, including several in his most recent collection The Devil You Know (2003) and the novella D*U*C*K, chronicle events in the lives of the extended Stubbs family, a Catholic clan whose roots are sunk deep in the traditional culture of New Orleans. Martin hopes to eventually write three more novels in the Liquor series, tentatively titled Dead Shrimp Blues, Hurricane Stew, and Double Shot. However, in late 2006, he ceased publishing with Three Rivers Press, the trade paperback division of Random House that published the first three Liquor novels, and is currently taking a hiatus from fiction writing. He has described Antediluvian Tales, a short story collection published by Subterranean Press in November 2007, as "if not my last book ever, then my last one for some time." He still writes short non-fiction pieces, including guest editorials for the New Orleans Times-Picayune and a food article for Chile Pepper Magazine.

Martin has often stated that, while he will allow some of his work to be optioned for film under the right circumstances, he has little interest in movies and is not overly eager to see his work filmed. In 1999, his short story The Sixth Sentinel (filmed as The Dream Sentinel) made up one segment of episode 209 of The Hunger, a short-lived horror anthology series on Showtime.

Critical essays on Martin's fiction appear in Supernatural Fiction Writers: Contemporary Fantasy and Horror (2003) by Brian Stableford and The Evolution of the Weird Tale (2004) by S. T. Joshi.

On June 9, 2010, Martin officially stated that he was retired from writing, in a post entitled "I'm Basically Retired (For Now)" on his Livejournal. He stated that he had "completely lost the ability to interact with [his] body of work" and then went on to state that business issues were a partial cause. He also specifically mentioned being unable to disconnect from aspects of his life relating to Hurricane Katrina. He ended his statement by saying that he missed having relationships with his characters and that he did not feel the need to write for publication. Martin has since created a series of artworks themed on New Orleans and voodoo.

In 2018, Martin announced he had returned to writing with a non-fiction project entitled Water If God Wills It: Religion and Spirituality in the Work of Stephen King.

In August 2023, Martin announced on his own Facebook page that he was writing fiction again, but that it would be a long time until it would be published.

In 2025, a story by Martin, "Till Human Voices Wake Us, And We Drown", was included in The End of the World as We Know It, a collection of short stories inspired by events in Stephen King's The Stand. The story was published under the name of Poppy Z. Brite.

== Personal life ==
Martin was born in Bowling Green, Warren County, Kentucky, at Western University Hospital. He is a trans man and has written and talked extensively about transgender issues and his own gender dysphoria. He is gay, and has said, "Ever since I was old enough to know what gay men were, I've considered myself a gay man that happens to have been born in a female body, and that's the perspective I'm coming from." In 2003, Martin wrote that, while gender theorists like Kate Bornstein would call him a "nonoperative transsexual", Martin would not insist on a label, writing "I'm just me". In 2010, he began hormone therapy, and in 2011 expressed that he would prefer to be referred to by male pronouns.

On January 6, 2009, Martin was arrested at Our Lady of Good Counsel Church in New Orleans as part of a peaceful demonstration in which churches in the Uptown area of the city were occupied to protest their closings. In August 2009, New Orleans's Gambit publication published reader-poll results naming Martin in second place as an ever-popular "Best Local Author".

Martin married his husband, photographer and artist Grey Anatoli Cross, in 2019. The couple first met in 2011.

== Bibliography ==
=== Novels and novellas ===
- Lost Souls (1992)
- Drawing Blood (1993)
- Exquisite Corpse (1996)
- The Crow: The Lazarus Heart (1998)
- Plastic Jesus (novella; 2000)
- The Liquor series:
  - The Value of X (2002)
  - Liquor (2004)
  - Prime (2005)
  - Soul Kitchen (2006)
  - D*U*C*K (novella; 2007)
- Triads (with Christa Faust; 2004)
- Second Line (2009)

=== Short story collections ===
- Wormwood (limited publishing in the UK under the original title Swamp Foetus, 1993)
- His Mouth Will Taste of Wormwood and Other Stories (reprinting four Wormwood stories, 1995)
  - Collecting: Calcutta, Lord of Nerves; His Mouth Will Taste of Wormwood (adapted from The Hound); How To Get Ahead in New York; and The Sixth Sentinel
- Are You Loathsome Tonight? (published in the UK as Self-Made Man, 1998)
  - Collecting: America, Are You Loathsome Tonight?; Arise, Entertaining Mr. Orton, In Vermis Veritas, King of the Cats (with David Ferguson), Mussolini and the Axeman's Jazz, Pin Money, Saved (with Christa Faust), Self-Made Man, and Vine of the Soul
- Wrong Things (with Caitlín R. Kiernan, 2001)
  - Collecting: The Crystal Empire (Poppy Z. Brite), Onion (Caitlin R. Kiernan) and The Rest of the Wrong Thing (Poppy Z. Brite and Caitlin R. Kiernan)
- The Devil You Know (2003)
  - Collecting: Bayou de la Mère; Burn, Baby, Burn (a Hellboy narrative); The Devil You Know (continuing The Master and Margarita); The Heart of New Orleans; Lantern Marsh; Marisol; Nothing of Him That Doth Fade; The Ocean; Oh Death, Where Is Thy Spatula?; Pansu; Poivre; A Season in Heck; and System Freeze (a Matrix webcomic)
- Used Stories (2004)
  - Collecting: Essence of Rose, The Goose Girl, Homewrecker, Nailed, and Toxic Wastrels
- Antediluvian Tales (2007)
  - Collecting: Crown of Thorns, The Devil of Delery Street, The Feast of St. Rosalie, Four Flies and a Swatter, Henry Goes Shopping, The Last Good Day of My Life, The Working Slob’s Prayer (Being A Night in the History of the Peychaud Grill), and Wound Man and Horned Melon Go to Hell
- A Little Purple Book of New Orleans Stories (2021)
  - Collecting: The Devil You Know, Four Flies and a Swatter, The Gulf, The Heart of New Orleans, Missing, Mussolini and the Axeman's Jazz, and Wound Man and Horned Melon go to Hell

=== Anthologies (as editor) ===
- Love in Vein (with Martin H. Greenberg; 1994)
- Twice Bitten (Love in Vein II) (1997)

=== Uncollected short stories ===
- Fuck It, We're Going To Jamaica! (written for Necromance)
- O Urizel! (web publishing, 1984)
- The Ring (web publishing, 1986)
- R.I.P. (chapbook, 1998)
- "The Seed of Lost Souls" (1999)
- Stay Awake (chapbook, 2000)
- Would You? (chapbook, 2000)
- "Con Party at Hotel California" (2002)
- The Freaks (found in The Spook #12, 2002)
- "Night Story 1973" (with Caitlín R. Kiernan, found in From Weird and Distant Shores, 2002)
- The Curious Case of Miss Violet Stone (with David Ferguson for Shadows Over Baker Street, 2003)
- De-Flower of the Orient (as Lucas Ransom for Cherry Boys magazine, 2004)
- "Liquor for Christmas" (2007)
- "The H.O.G. Syndrome" (Martin's first and 9000 word "novel", written at age 12; 2007)

=== Non-fiction ===
- Courtney Love: The Real Story (biography, 1997)
- Guilty But Insane (essays, 2001)

=== Uncollected short fiction ===
- "Wandering the Borderlands" (Masques V, 2006; Gauntlet Press)

== Awards ==
| Work | Year & Award | Category | Result | Ref. |
|---|---|---|---|---|
| The Ash of Memory, the Dust of Desire | 1991 Bram Stoker Award | Short Fiction | Nominated | |
| Lost Souls | 1993 Lambda Literary Award for Speculative Fiction | Gay Men's Science Fiction/Fantasy | Nominated | |
| Lost Souls | 1993 Locus Award | First Novel | Nominated | |
| Lost Souls | 1993 Locus Award | Horror/Dark Fantasy Novel | Nominated | |
| Lost Souls | 1992 Bram Stoker Award | First Novel | Nominated | |
| Drawing Blood | 1993 Bram Stoker Award | Novel | Nominated | |
| Drawing Blood | 1994 Lambda Literary Award for Speculative Fiction | Science Fiction/Fantasy | Nominated | |
| Drawing Blood | 1994 Locus Award | Horror | Nominated | |
| Drawing Blood | 1994 World Fantasy Award | Novel | Nominated | |
| Drawing Blood | 1996 International Horror Guild Award | Novel | Nominated | |
| Exquisite Corpse (novel) | 1996 Bram Stoker Award | Novel | Nominated | |
| Exquisite Corpse (novel) | 1996 International Horror Guild Award | Novel | Nominated | |
| Swamp Foetus | 1994 Locus Award | Collection | Nominated | |
| Love in Vein (with Martin H. Greenberg) | 1995 Locus Award | Anthology | Nominated | |
| Love in Vein (with Martin H. Greenberg) | 1995 World Fantasy Award | Anthology | Nominated | |
| Love in Vein (with Martin H. Greenberg) | 1994 International Horror Guild Award | Anthology | Won | |
| Love in Vein II | 1998 Locus Award | Anthology | Nominated | |
| Are You Loathsome Tonight? | 1999 Locus Award | Collection | Nominated | |
| Calcutta, Lord of Nerves | 1993 World Fantasy Award | Short Fiction | Nominated | |
| Calcutta, Lord of Nerves | 1998 Grand prix de l'Imaginaire | Foreign Short story/Collection of Foreign Short Stories | Won | |
| Wormwood | 1996 International Horror Guild Award | Short Story | Nominated | |
| | 1994 British Fantasy Award | Sydney J. Bounds Award | Won | |

== See also ==
- List of horror fiction writers
