= Tales of Pain and Wonder =

Short story collection by Caitlín R. Kiernan

- Cover art by Richard A. Kirk
- Author: Caitlín R. Kiernan
- Genre: Short story collection
- Publisher: Subterranean
- ISBN: 978-1-59606-144-6

Tales of Pain and Wonder is Caitlín R. Kiernan's first short story collection. The stories are interconnected to varying degrees, and a number of Kiernan's characters reappear throughout the book, particularly Jimmy DeSade and Salmagundi Desvernine. The stories run the gamut from dark fantasy ("Rats Live on No Evil Star" and "Estate") to ghost stories and supernatural horror fiction ("Angels You Can See Through" and "Anamorphosis") to noir fiction ("Breakfast in the House of the Rising Sun" and "Lafayette"). A number of the stories have a decidedly H. P. Lovecraftian flavor and the influence of Charles Fort, as does much of Kiernan's fiction published since Tales of Pain and Wonder. The stories are also united by a theme of cultural decay and loss of meaning in 20th-century society, as expressed by the collection's epilogue, Kiernan's only published poem, "Zelda Fitzgerald in Ballet Attire." Originally published in 2000 as an expensive limited-edition hardback by Gauntlet Publishing, it was reissued in trade paperback format in 2002 by Meisha Merlin Publishing. In 2008, Subterranean Press re-issued the book again, in a limited edition hardcover, with a new author's introduction and two new stories, "Mercury" and "Salammbô Redux", and omitting the story "Angels You Can See Through". All three editions include artwork by Canadian illustrator Richard A. Kirk, as well as an introduction by anthologist/novelist Douglas E. Winter and an afterword by novelist Peter Straub.

== Contents ==
†	Not included in the third edition
‡	Appears in the third edition only

- Introduction: Pain, Wonder, and Caitlin R. Kiernan (Douglas E. Winter)
- "Anamorphosis"
- "To This Water (Johnstown, Pennsylvania 1889)"
- "Bela's Plot"
- "Tears Seven Times Salt"
- "Superheroes"
- "Glass Coffin"
- "Breakfast in the House of the Rising Sun"
- "Estate"
- "The Last Child or Lir"
- "A Story for Edward Gorey"
- "Paedomorphosis"
- "Salammbô"
- "Postcards from the King of Tides"
- "Rats Live on No Evil Star"
- "Salmagundi"
- "In the Water Works (Birmingham, Alabama 1888)"
- "The Long Hall on the Top Floor"
- "San Andreas"
- "Angels You Can See Through" ^{†}
- "Mercury" ^{‡}
- "Lafayette"
- "...Between the Gargoyle Trees"
- "Salammbô Redux" ^{‡}
- Epilogue: "Zelda Fitzgerald in Ballet Attire"
- Afterword (Peter Straub)

== Editions ==
- ISBN 1-887368-26-4 (hardback, 2000)
- ISBN 1-892065-38-X (trade paperback, 2002)

== Reception ==
Publishers Weekly gave a starred review to the collection, writing "the impact of these stories is stunning: glancing collisions between psychics, runaways, junkies, artists and whores... add up to a portrait of something broken and beautiful." However, the reviewer criticized the stories Anamorphosis and To This Water for relying on tropes of pedophilia and rape.
