= Caitlín R. Kiernan =

Irish-born American writer (born 1964)

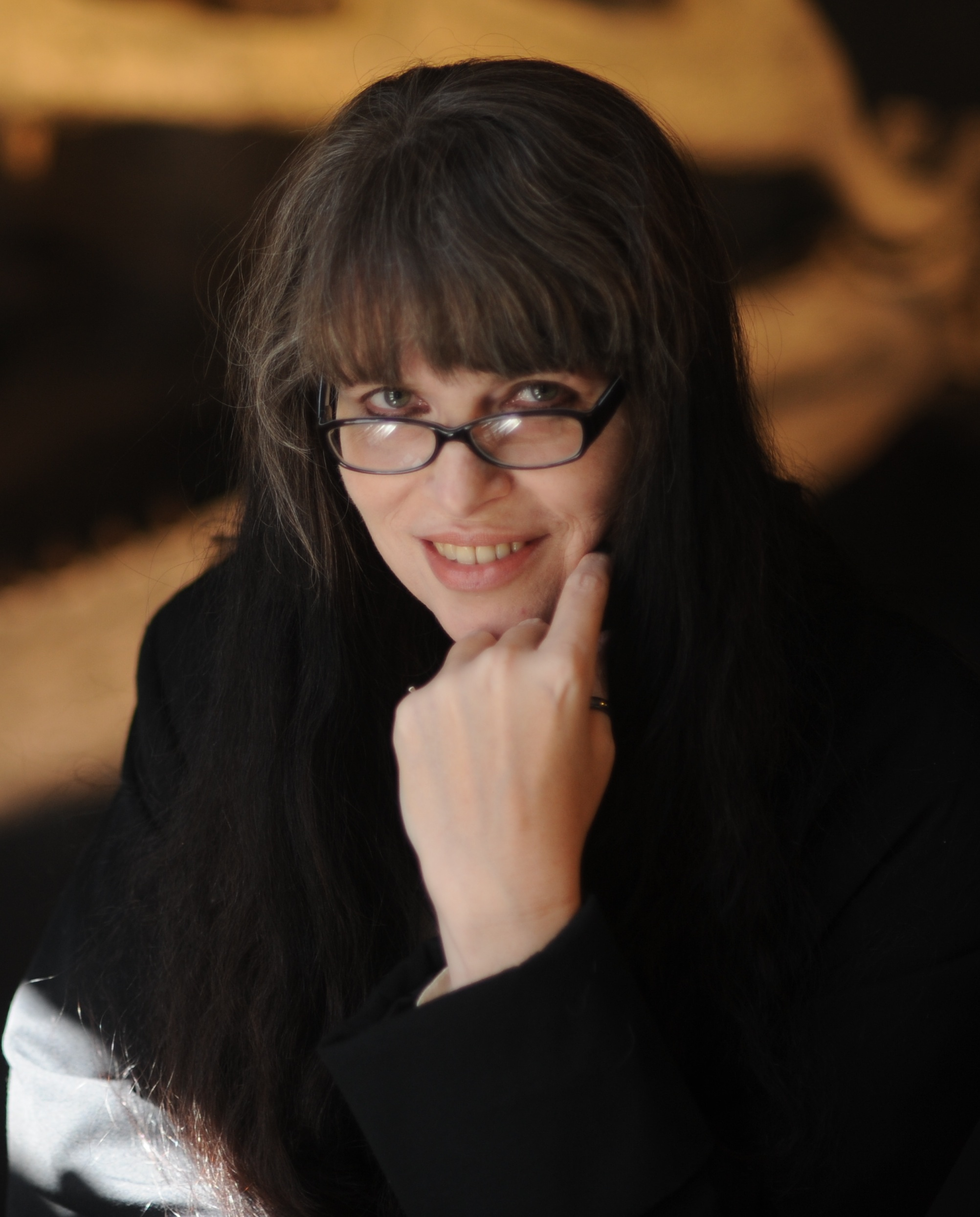
- Kiernan in 2011
- Born: 26 May 1964 (age 62); Skerries, Ireland
- Education: Birmingham-Southern College, (B.S., Biological Sciences, 1985); University of Colorado Boulder (M.S., Geology, 1988)
- Occupations: Writer, paleontologist
- Writing career
- Pen name: Kathleen Tierney
- Period: 1984–present
- Genres: Science fiction, dark fantasy, weird fiction
- Notable works: Silk; Threshold; Alabaster; The Red Tree; The Drowning Girl
- Website: caitlinrkiernan.com

Caitlín Rebekah Kiernan (born 26 May 1964) is an Irish-born American paleontologist and writer of science fiction and dark fantasy works, including 10 novels, series of comic books, and more than 250 published short stories, novellas, and vignettes. Kiernan is a two-time recipient of both the World Fantasy and Bram Stoker awards.

== Early life ==
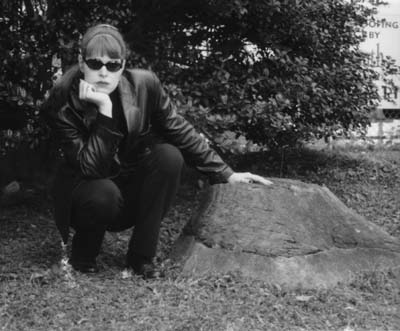
Kiernan in 2001

Kiernan was born in 1964 in Skerries, County Dublin, Ireland. After the death of their father, Kiernan moved to the United States as a young child with their mother Susan Ramey Cleveland and younger sister Mary Angela (Máire Aingeal). Much of their childhood was spent in the small town of Leeds, Alabama, and early interests included herpetology, paleontology, and fiction writing. As a teenager, Kiernan lived in Trussville, Alabama, and, in high school, began doing volunteer work at the Red Mountain Museum in Birmingham, Alabama and spending summers on their first archaeological and paleontological digs.

Kiernan attended college at the University of Alabama at Birmingham, Birmingham–Southern College, and the University of Colorado Boulder, studying geology and vertebrate paleontology, and held both museum and teaching positions before finally turning to fiction writing in 1992. They were awarded a summer internship by Petrified Forest National Park for the summer of 1993. Kiernan has been referred to as a polymath.

== Career ==
=== Paleontology ===
In 1984, Kiernan co-founded the Birmingham Paleontological Society. In 1988, they co-authored a paper describing the new genus and species of mosasaur, Selmasaurus russelli. More recent papers include one on the biostratigraphy of Alabama mosasaurs, published in the Journal of Vertebrate Paleontology (2002) and "First record of a velociraptorine theropod (Tetanurae, Dromaeosauridae) from the Eastern Gulf Coastal United States" (2004).

As of 2019, Kiernan is a research associate and fossil preparator at McWane Science Center in Birmingham, Alabama, again studying mosasaurs, as well as Cretaceous turtles. In 2020, they coauthored on a paper describing a new large fossil sea turtle, Asmodochelys parhami, from the Demopolis Chalk of Alabama. In 2021, Kiernan also joined the staff of the University of Alabama Museum, Department of Research and Collections, as a Research Associate in Vertebrate Paleontology. In 2022, they coauthored the description of a new giant freshwater turtle from the Late Cretaceous Mooreville Chalk of Alabama, Appalachemys ebersolei, a previously unknown macrobaenid with a shell more than 80 cm.in length. In 2023, they were the senior author on a paper describing two new species of the rare mosasaur Ectenosaurus, E. tlemonectes and E. shannoni, from the Niobrara and Mooreville formations of Kansas and Alabama, respectively.

Kiernan has been a member of the Society of Vertebrate Paleontology since 1984 and is a member of the Paleontological Society and the American Society of Ichthyologists and Herpetologists. At various times, they have been a member of the Alabama Academy of Science, Sigma Xi, the Society of Sedimentary Geology, the American Mathematical Society, and the Paleontological Research Institution.

=== Novels, short fiction, and comics ===
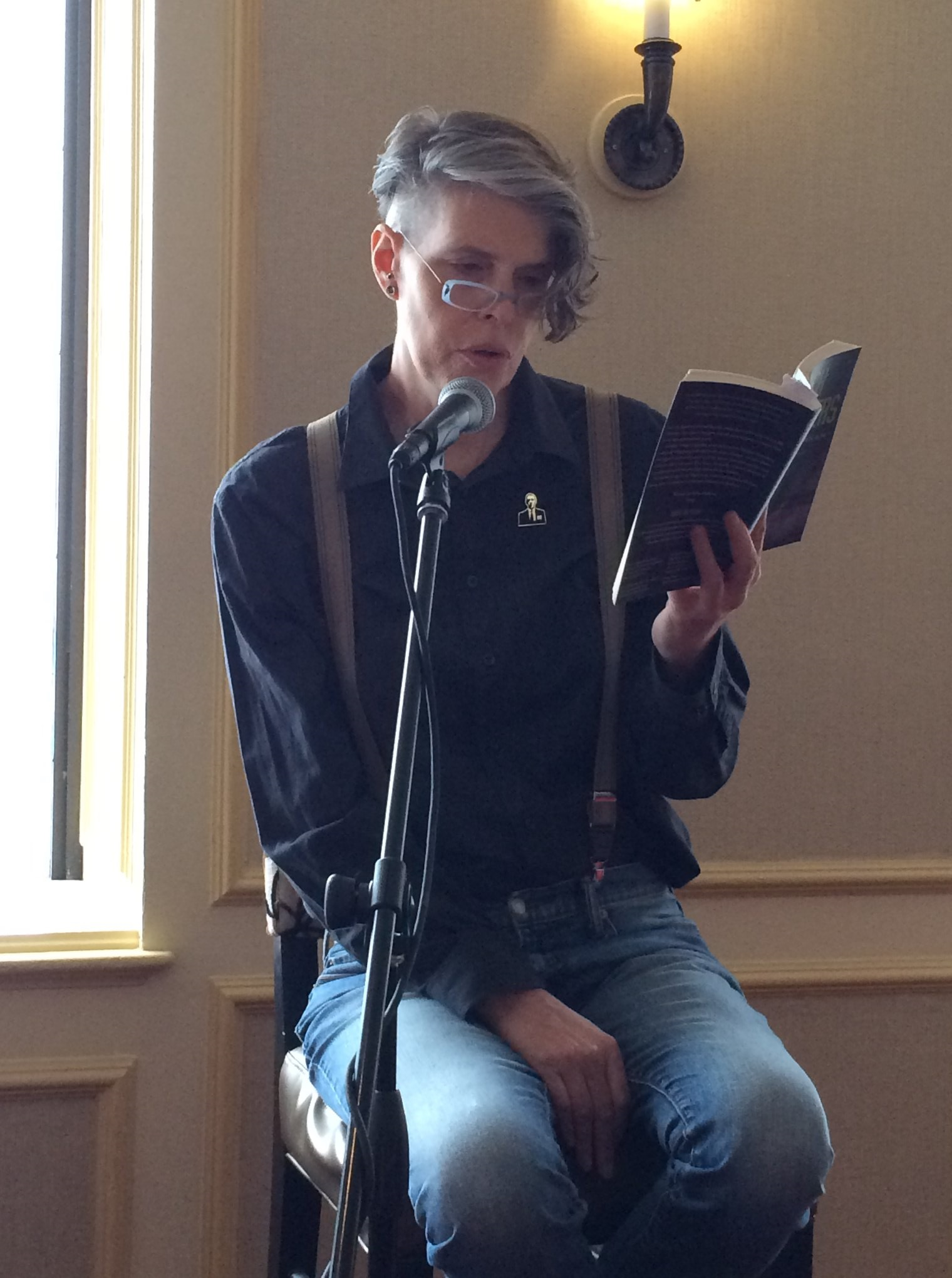
Kiernan in 2018, Providence, Rhode Island

Kiernan's first novel, The Five of Cups, was written between June 1992 and early 1993, though it was not published until 2003. Their first published short story was "Persephone", a dark science fiction tale released in 1995. Their first published novel, Silk, was released in 1998.

Kiernan's short fiction was selected for Year's Best Fantasy and Horror series, The Mammoth Book of Best New Horror, and The Year's Best Science Fiction, and their short stories have been collected in several volumes (see Bibliography). To date, Kiernan's work has been translated into German, Italian, Chinese, French, Turkish, Spanish, Portuguese, Finnish, Czech, Polish, Russian, Korean, and Japanese.

Kiernan was approached by writer Neil Gaiman and editors at Vertigo Comics to write for The Dreaming, a spin-off from Gaiman's The Sandman, and did so from 1996 until its conclusion in 2001, focusing on both pre-existing characters (the Corinthian, Cain and Abel, Lucien, Nuala, Morpheus, Thessaly, etc.) and creating new characters (Echo, Maddy, the white dream raven Tethys, etc.). They wrote the novelization for the 2007 Beowulf film (scripted by Gaiman and Roger Avary). Kiernan later scripted Alabaster: Wolves (2012) for Dark Horse Comics, continuing with Alabaster: Grimmer Tales (2013) and Alabaster: The Good, the Bad, and the Bird (2014).

=== Film and screenwriting ===
Josh Boone's Mid-World Productions has optioned both The Red Tree and The Drowning Girl to develop into feature films. Kiernan is writing the screenplay for The Red Tree, and Boone will be writing The Drowning Girl. Kiernan stated, "A few people have asked questions about the films and preserving the queerness of the novels. This is something you do not have to worry about. Also, though no details can be released yet and nothing is certain, the hope is that we can cast a transgender actress as Abalyn Armitage."

== Style and genre ==
Kiernan's blog states:

I'm getting tired of telling people that I'm not a 'horror' writer. I'm getting tired of them not listening, or not believing. Most of them seem suspicious of my motives.

I've never tried to fool anyone. I've said I don't write genre 'horror.' A million, billion times have I said that.

It's not that there are not strong elements of horror present in a lot of my writing. It's that horror never predominates those works. You may as well call it psychological fiction or awe fiction. I don't think of horror as a genre. I think of it – to paraphrase Doug Winter – as an emotion, and no one emotion will ever characterize my fiction.

Much of Kiernan's earlier work, such as Silk, is set among or alludes to the aesthetics of the goth and punk rock subcultures, elements which are generally absent in their later novels.

Kiernan has also stated, regarding the role of plot in creative writing: "anyone can come up with the artifice/conceit of a 'good story.' Story bores me. Which is why critics complain it's the weakest aspect of my work. Because that's essentially purposeful. I have no real interest in plot. Atmosphere, mood, language, character, theme, etc., that's the stuff that fascinates me. Ulysses should have freed writers from plot."

In his review of The Red Tree, H. P. Lovecraft scholar S. T. Joshi writes: "Kiernan already ranks with the most distinctive stylists in our field – Edgar Allan Poe, Lord Dunsany, Thomas Ligotti. With Ligotti's regrettable retreat into fictional silence, hers is now the voice of weird fiction." In their introduction to The Weird, Ann and Jeff VanderMeer write that Kiernan has "become perhaps the best weird writer of her generation."

== Music ==
In 1996 and 1997, Kiernan fronted an Athens, Georgia-based "goth-folk-blues band", Death's Little Sister, named for Neil Gaiman's character Delirium. They were the band's vocalist and lyricist, and the group enjoyed some success on local college radio and played shows in Athens and Atlanta. Other members included Barry Dillard (guitars), Michael Graves (bass), and Shelly Ross (keyboards). Kiernan left the band in February 1997 because of their increased responsibilities writing for DC Comics and because Silk had recently sold. They were briefly involved in Crimson Stain Mystery, a studio project, two years later, which produced one EP to accompany a special limited edition of Silk, illustrated by Clive Barker (Gauntlet Press, 2000).

== Publishing ==
In December 2005, Kiernan began publishing the monthly Sirenia Digest (otherwise known as MerViSS) consisting of vignettes and short stories: "The MerViSS Project is a continuation of Kiernan's exploration of the fusion of erotic literature with elements of dark fantasy and science fiction, creating brief, dreamlike fictions." It is illustrated by Vince Locke. The digest includes the occasional collaboration with Sonya Taaffe.

== Archives ==
The Caitlín R. Kiernan Papers at the John Hay Library at Brown University consist of twenty-three linear feet of manuscript materials, including correspondence, journals, manuscripts, and publications, circa 1970–2017, in print, electronic, and web-based formats, as well as their first computer and other artifacts of their career. Additions to the collection are regularly made by the author. In 2017, a formal reception was held at the Hay Library to announce the collection and to unveil "Caitlín R. Kiernan Papers @ Brown University Library", an exhibit based on them.

== Personal life ==
In their twenties, Kiernan identified as transgender and transitioned to female, further identifying as lesbian. In 2020, Kiernan stated, "I no longer consider myself transgender (or transsexual). I would say that I'm gender fluid, if I had to say anything", explaining that this was not a recognized option in the 1980s. They added that male or female pronouns do not offend them, but prefer "they, them, and their".

Kiernan identifies as an atheist. Politically, they have described themself as a classical liberal.

Kiernan lives in Birmingham, Alabama, with photographer and doll maker Kathryn A. Pollnac.

== Awards ==
=== Won ===
- International Horror Guild Award, Best First Novel 1998 (Silk)
- Barnes and Noble Maiden Voyage Award, Best First Novel 1998 (Silk)
- International Horror Guild Award, Best Novel 2001 (Threshold)
- International Horror Guild Award, Best Short Story 2001 ("Onion")
- International Horror Guild Award, Best Mid-Length Fiction 2005 ("La Peau Verte")
- James Tiptree, Jr. Award Honoree, 2010 ("Galápagos")
- James Tiptree, Jr. Award Winner, 2012 (The Drowning Girl: A Memoir)
- Bram Stoker Award, Best Novel 2012 (The Drowning Girl: A Memoir)
- Bram Stoker Award, Best Graphic Novel 2013 (Alabaster: Wolves)
- Locus Award for Best Short Story 2014, ("The Road of Needles")
- World Fantasy Award—Short Fiction 2014, ("The Prayer of Ninety Cats")
- World Fantasy Award, Best Collection 2014, (The Ape's Wife and Other Stories)

=== Nominated (partial list) ===
- Bram Stoker Award 1995, Best Short Story ("Persephone")
- Bram Stoker Award, Best First Novel 1998 (Silk)
- British Fantasy Award, Best First Novel 1998 (Silk)
- Gay & Lesbian Alliance Against Defamation Award, Best Graphic Novel 1998 (The Girl Who Would Be Death)
- International Horror Guild Award, Best Collection (Tales of Pain and Wonder)
- Bram Stoker Award, Best Graphic Novel 2001 (The Dreaming No. 56, "The First Adventure of Miss Caterina Poe")
- International Horror Guild Award, Best Graphic Novel 2001 (The Dreaming No. 56, "The First Adventure of Miss Caterina Poe")
- International Horror Guild Award, Best Short Form 2002 ("The Road of Pins")
- International Horror Guild Award, Best Collection 2005 (To Charles Fort, With Love)
- World Fantasy Award 2006, Best Collection 2005 (To Charles Fort, With Love)
- World Fantasy Award 2006, Best Short Fiction 2005 ("La Peau Verte")
- International Horror Guild Award, Best Mid-Length Fiction 2006 ("Bainbridge")
- Locus Award 2010 (40th Annual), Best Fantasy Novel (The Red Tree)
- Locus Award 2010 (40th Annual), Best Collection (A is for Alien)
- Shirley Jackson Award (3rd Annual, 2010), Best Novel (The Red Tree)
- World Fantasy Award 2010, Best Novel (The Red Tree)
- Shirley Jackson Award (4th Annual, 2011), Best Short Story ("As Red as Red")
- World Fantasy Award 2011, Best Collection 2010 (The Ammonite Violin & Others)
- Bram Stoker Award 2011, Best Collection (Two Worlds and in Between: The Best of Caitlin R. Kiernan, Volume 1)
- Bram Stoker Award 2011, Best Long Fiction ("The Collier's Venus [1893]")
- Locus Award 2012, Best Collection (Two Worlds and in Between: The Best of Caitlin R. Kiernan, Volume 1)
- World Fantasy Award 2012, Best Collection (Two Worlds and in Between: The Best of Caitlin R. Kiernan, Volume 1)
- Nebula Award 2012, Best Novel (The Drowning Girl: A Memoir)
- British Fantasy Award 2012, Best Fantasy Novel (The Drowning Girl: A Memoir)
- World Fantasy Award 2012, Best Novel (The Drowning Girl: A Memoir)
- Mythopoeic Award 2012, Adult Literature (The Drowning Girl: A Memoir)
- Shirley Jackson Award 2012, Best Novel (The Drowning Girl: A Memoir)
- Bram Stoker Award 2013, Fiction Collection (The Ape's Wife and Other Stories)
- World Fantasy Award 2014, Best Novella (Black Helicopters)
- World Fantasy Award 2014, Best Short Story ("The Prayer of Ninety Cats")
- World Fantasy Award 2014, Best Collection (The Ape's Wife and Other Stories)
- Bram Stoker Award 2017, Long Fiction (Agents of Dreamland)
- Locus Award 2018, Best Novella (Agents of Dreamland)
- Locus Award 2019, Best Collection (The Dinosaur Tourist)
- Locus Award 2019, Best Novella (Black Helicopters)
- Locus Award 2020, Best Collection (The Very Best of Caitlín R. Kiernan)
- Locus Award 2026, Best Collection (Bright Dead Star)
- Mystery Writers of Japan Award 2026, Translation (Double Copper Award) (The Drowning Girl: A Memoir)
- Science Fiction and Fantasy Hall of Fame nominated, 2026 (Museum of Pop Culture, Seattle)

== Bibliography ==
=== Novels ===
- Silk. G. P. Putnam's Sons. 1998. ISBN 978-0-451-45668-7.
- Threshold (2001, G. P. Putnam's Sons) ISBN 9780451461247
- The Five of Cups. Subterranean Press. 2003. ISBN 978-1-931081-80-1.
- Low Red Moon. G. P. Putnam's Sons. 2003. ISBN 978-1-931081-84-9.
- Murder of Angels. G. P. Putnam's Sons. 2004. ISBN 978-0-451-45996-1.
- Daughter of Hounds. G. P. Putnam's Sons. 2007. ISBN 978-0-451-46157-5.
- Beowulf (2007; HarperCollins; novelisation of 2007 film) ISBN 9780061543388
- The Red Tree (2009; Penguin-Putnam) ISBN 9780451463500
- The Drowning Girl: A Memoir (March 2012; Penguin-Putnam) ISBN 9780451464163
- Blood Oranges (writing as Kathleen Tierney; February 2013, Penguin-Putnam) ISBN 9780451465016
- Red Delicious (writing as Kathleen Tierney; 2014, Penguin-Putnam) ISBN 9780451416537
- Cherry Bomb (writing as Kathleen Tierney; 2015, Penguin-Putnam) ISBN 9780451416551
- Agents of Dreamland (2017; Tor) ISBN 0765394324
- Black Helicopters (2018; Tor) ISBN 1250191130
- La Belle Fleur Sauvage (2020; Dark Regions Press) ISBN 9781626412873
- The Tindalos Asset (2020; Tor) ISBN 9781250191151
- Zoetrope Bizarre (2025; Subterranean Press) ISBN 9781645243090

=== Short fiction collections ===
- Tales of Pain and Wonder (2000, Gauntlet Press; 2002, Meisha Merlin; 2008, Subterranean Press; 2016, PS Publishing)
- Wrong Things (with Poppy Z. Brite; 2001; Subterranean Press)
- From Weird and Distant Shores (2002 & 2022; Subterranean Press)
- To Charles Fort, with Love (2005; Subterranean Press; 2018, PS Publishing)
- Alabaster (2006; Subterranean Press; illustrated by Ted Naifeh; reissued by Dark Horse Comics, February 2014, as Alabaster: Pale Horse)
- A Is for Alien (2009; Subterranean Press; illustrated by Vince Locke; 2015, PS Publishing)
- The Ammonite Violin & Others (2010; Subterranean Press; 2018, PS Publishing)
- Two Worlds and in Between: The Best of Caitlin R. Kiernan (Volume One) (2011; Subterranean Press)
- Confessions of a Five-Chambered Heart (2012; Subterranean Press)
- The Ape's Wife and Other Stories (2013; Subterranean Press)
- Beneath an Oil-Dark Sea: The Best of Caitlin R. Kiernan (Volume Two) (2015; Subterranean Press)
- Dear Sweet Filthy World (2017; Subterranean Press)
- Houses Under the Sea: Mythos Tales (2018; Centipede Press; reissued by Subterranean Press, September 2019)
- The Dinosaur Tourist (2018; Subterranean Press)
- The Very Best of Caitlín R. Kiernan (2019; Tachyon Publications)
- A Little Yellow Book of Fever Dreams (2019; Borderlands Press)
- Comes a Pale Rider (2020; Subterranean Press)
- Vile Affections (2021; Subterranean Press)
- Cambrian Tales: Juvenilia (2021, Subterranean Press)
- The Variegated Alphabet (2021; Subterranean Press)
- Bradbury Weather (2024; Subterranean Press)
- Bright Dead Star (2025; Subterranean Press)
- The Tinfoil Dossier (omnibus edition; 2026; Subterranean Press, forthcoming)

== Notes ==
Preceded by Gregory Norman Bossert	World Fantasy Award—Short Fiction winner 2014	Succeeded by Scott Nicolay
