= Rick Klaw =

American editor, essayist, and bookseller

- Born: December 22, 1967 (age 58); Brooklyn, New York, U.S.
- Occupations: Editor; essayist; bookseller
- Writing career
- Notable works: Mojo Press "Geeks with Books"

Richard Ira "Rick" Klaw (born December 22, 1967, in Brooklyn, New York), is an American editor, essayist, and bookseller.

== Biography ==
Rick Klaw is the paternal grandson of Irving Klaw, the photographer and film maker most noted for his bondage photos of Bettie Page. In 1979, the family relocated to Houston, Texas. Klaw moved to Austin, Texas, in 1987 and was part of the Austin cadre of comics and science fiction writers and artists in the early 1990s, a group which included Shannon Wheeler, Chris Ware, Martin Wagner, Lea Hernandez, Roy Tompkins, John Lucas, and Mark Finn.

Klaw has worked at several bookstores, primarily in Austin, Texas. Notably, he worked at a particular Bookstop branch (later taken over by Barnes & Noble), about which he recalls fondly:

"..this particular store had the greatest collection of bookselling talent I have ever worked with... Most of my fellow booksellers became bookstore managers either Bookstop/B&N or with other companies, and many of them became published critics."

From 1990 to 1994, Klaw was also managing editor for the independent comics publisher Blackbird Press, which produced the first collection by cartoonist Shannon Wheeler, an anthology entitled Omnibus: Modern Perversity, as well as other projects.

In October 1994, Klaw began managing Adventures in Crime & Space, a science fiction/mystery bookstore in Austin (along with three Bookstop employees), where the stores' promotions gained recognition from The Austin Chronicle, which named the store the "coolest bookstore in the city". One such quirky promotion which ultimately fell through was a scheduled "signing" by Philip K. Dick, despite the author having died some years previously. Ultimately abandoned due to a difference of opinion with the owner, this factored into Klaw's decision to leave in February 1996, to focus more on his duties as managing editor of Mojo Press.

== Mojo Press ==
After leaving Blackbird Press in 1994, Klaw co-founded (with Ben Ostrander) the small publishing company Mojo Press, where he served as the Managing Editor from 1994 to 1998. At Mojo, Klaw was responsible for editing between fifteen and sixteen publications - most notably Weird Business (below), a hardcover comics anthology co-edited with Joe R. Lansdale, and a reprint of Michael Moorcock's novella Behold the Man. Weird Business was nominated for an Eisner Award for Best Anthology in 1996.

== Geeks With Books ==
Since leaving Mojo Press, Klaw has pursued a number of ventures, including (in 1998) editing the letters pages for DC Comics' Michael Moorcock's Multiverse (#4-11), but perhaps his most noteworthy post-Mojo venture was his monthly column, "Geeks with Books", written from 2000 to 2004 for SF Site. Most of these columns were included in the 2003 collection from MonkeyBrain Press Geek Confidential: Echoes From the 21st Century (left). The SF Site column came to an end in August, 2004, but Klaw has continued a sporadically-produced e-mail list, "All the Geek That is Fit to Print," and is a regular contributor to The Dark Forces Book Group Blog.

== Non-Geeks work ==
Klaw was the founding fiction editor of RevolutionSF in 2001, and continuing in that role until the end of 2002. He still serves as a Contributing Editor on the site, but it was as fiction editor that he published both experimental and post-modern fiction by new and established authors such as Moorcock, Don Webb, Joe R. Lansdale, Jeff VanderMeer, Bruce Sterling, Chris Nakashima-Brown, Neal Barrett, Jr., Scott Cupp, Vera Searles, and others.

Since 2002, Klaw has written book and film reviews for The Austin Chronicle; film reviews for Moving Pictures magazine, and essays for a number of other venues.

== Partial bibliography ==
- Creature Features (ed.) (Mojo Press, 1994) - An original horror graphic novel anthology.**Contributors included Lansdale, Ted Naifeh, Alan Hawthorne, Franz Henkel, Bill D. Fountain and others.
- Weird Business (co-ed. with Joe R. Lansdale) (Mojo Press, 1995)
  - Contributors included Neal Barrett, Jr., John Bergin, Ambrose Bierce, Robert Bloch, Poppy Z. Brite, Nancy Collins, Charles de Lint, Bill D. Fountain, Pia Guerra, Phil Hester, Michael Lark, John Lucas, Paul O. Miles, Michael Moorcock, Ted Naifeh, Ande Parks, John Picacio, Edgar Allan Poe, Doug Potter, Al Sarrantonio, Howard Waldrop, Chet Williamson, F. Paul Wilson, Roger Zelazny, and others.
- Wild West Show (ed.) (Mojo Press, 1996) - A western graphic novel anthology
  - Contributors included Timothy Truman, Lewis Shiner, Sam Glanzman, Neal Barrett, Jr., Doug Potter, Marc Erickson, Martin Thomas, Michael Washburn, Paul O. Miles, Steve Utley, Don Webb, John Lucas, John Garcia, and Joe Preston.
- The Big Bigfoot Book (ed.) (Mojo Press, 1996) - An original anthology of Bigfoot stories
  - Contributors included Mark London Williams, Phil Hester, Joe Pruett, John Bergin, Neal Barrett, Jr., Bill D. Fountain, Batton Lash, William Browning Spencer, Paul O. Miles, and Dan Burr.
- Red Range (ed.) Written by Lansdale, Illustrated by Sam Glanzman (Mojo Press, 1999)
- "The Initiation," co-written with Joe R. Lansdale in Gangland (Vertigo Comics (2000))
- "John Calvin" in Electric Velocipede #5 by John Klima (ed.) (2003)
- Geek Confidential: Echoes from the 21st Century (Introduction by Michael Moorcock) (MonkeyBrain Books (Dec 25, 2003)) ISBN 1-932265-06-6
- "Flatulence, Food and Fornication" in Farscape Forever!: Sex, Drugs and Killer Muppets by Glenn Yeffeth (ed.) (BenBella Books (2005)) ISBN 1-932100-61-X
- "Thirty-Three" in King Kong Is Back! by David Brin with Leah Wilson (ed.) (BenBella Books 2005) ISBN 1-932100-64-4
- "The Notorious Irving Klaw", The Austin Chronicle March 10, 2006
- "Little Underground Worlds", The Austin Chronicle April 21, 2006
- "A Penny A Word," co-written with Paul O. Miles in Cross Plains Universe - Texans Celebrate Robert E. Howard by Scott A. Cupp & Joe R. Lansdale (ed.s) (MonkeyBrain Books (2006)
- Apes of Wrath (Tachyon Publications (2013)
- Rayguns Over Texas (FACT Publications (2013)
