= Mojo Press =

Defunct American small press

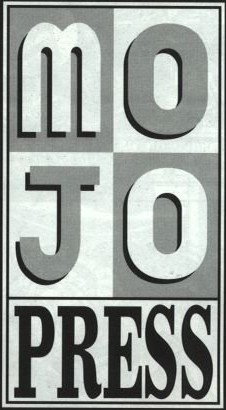
- Status: defunct, 1999
- Founded: 1994
- Founder: Ben Ostrander, Richard Klaw
- Country of origin: United States
- Headquarters location: Austin, Texas
- Key people: Joe R. Lansdale
- Publication types: Graphic novels, books
- Fiction genres: Science fiction, horror, western

Mojo Press was a small press which primarily published science fiction, horror, and western books and graphic novels between 1994 and 1999.

== History ==
Mojo Press was founded in 1994 by publisher Ben Ostrander and managing editor Richard Klaw ostensibly to publish the Joe R. Lansdale and Klaw co-edited anthology Weird Business (1995), although the first Mojo Press title was actually the Klaw-edited comic book anthology Creature Features (1994) featuring the original Lansdale story "Grease Trap", illustrated by Ted Naifeh.

In 1994, during the 90s comic-boom, friends Lansdale and Klaw had ruminated over the non-existence of "a comic book anthology with some of the biggest names in fantasy and horror fiction". Klaw suggested they produced one themselves, utilising Lansdale's connections, and the two began searching for a publisher. Concurrently, Klaw (then working in a Bookstop) had struck up a friendship with regular customer Ben Ostrander, even renewing his interest in comics after a considerable hiatus, having discovered the two shared many interests. Ostrander was looking to change careers, even approaching Klaw with the idea of opening a specialty science fiction shop, although this was ultimately scrapped.

Lansdale and Klaw, despite not having a publisher (Dark Horse, according to Klaw "looked at [them] like [they] had grown another head") were generating positive responses from possible contributors for their untitled anthology project. Poppy Z. Brite, Norman Partridge, Neal Barrett, Jr., Scott A. Cupp, Nancy A. Collins and Bill Crider all expressed their interest, and Klaw produced a proposal which Ostander agreed to. Soon:

The deal that ultimately created Mojo Press was sealed in the hotel bar of the 1994 Armadillocon.

Klaw had recently left Blackbird Comics, with two books—Wings and Creature Features—completed, but unpublished. Creature Features was:

a collection of six stories, one of which was an original by Joe R. Lansdale, with a cover and design by Darrin LeBlanc... inspired by [Klaw's] love for B-monster movies.

Ostrander and Klaw published it partly as a trial run with a local printing press in San Antonio, and partly to try out Darrin LeBlanc as an art director for their intended first (true) title: Weird Business. Ultimately, LeBlanc did indeed become art director, but Mojo's second title was printed in Canada.

Klaw took on book editing duties ("develop[ing] projects and talent"), while Ostrander was publisher - "dealing with printers and distributors, etc." For the first four Mojo titles, Ostrander and Klaw re-negotiated individual terms, but for the fifth, it was agreed that Klaw should become an official employee. He took the title of Managing Editor, a position he held until 1998, when he left the company.

This fifth title was also Mojo Press' first prose book: Behold the Man: The Thirtieth Anniversary Edition (1996) by Michael Moorcock with an introduction by Jonathan Carroll. It was designed and illustrated by John Picacio, and featured his first book cover, produced after Klaw took him to meet Moorcock, who personally gave him free rein. This "gave [Picacio] confidence at the time and.. set a tone for [his] career that continues to this day."

Over five years, Mojo produced nineteen separate publications. Klaw left Mojo Press is 1998, and the last three titles were edited by Ostrander.

Contrary to rumors, Lansdale did not own a stake in the publisher.

== Weird Business ==
Weird Business, the title for which Mojo Press was originally formed had a long gestation period, and took around 18 months to physically assemble. It was ultimately published on May 21, 1995 as a 420pg hardback, Mojo Press' third title - after a Weird Business Sampler became the second to see print in 1994. (Klaw's original proposal, by contrast, was for a "100 page hardcover book and a budget that was roughly ten percent of what the finished book eventually cost.")

Having cleared the main hurdle of finding a publisher (by forming one), and with some creative input already lined up (Klaw recalls that "Poppy Z. Brite sent... a script before we had a publisher, or even contracts for the contributors"), including Lansdale and Nancy A. Collins, Lansdale and Klaw began contacting various individuals to solicit contributions. Klaw was able to interest Nebula Award-winner Howard Waldrop and comics artist Michael Lark, while Robert Bloch, F. Paul Wilson, Charles de Lint and Roger Zelazny all signed on as well.

Klaw attempted to enlist one of his literary heroes, the legendary author Michael Moorcock, since the two had met previously at conventions and shared similar interests in science fiction and comics, both integral parts of the Weird Business anthology. Klaw cites Captain Marvel as a particular common interest. Moorcock was in the process of moving from his native London to Austin, Texas, and contacting him proved fraught with difficulty and misinformation.

Ultimately, Moorcock agreed to be a part of the project, and Klaw selected one of his Elric short stories (from the Earl Aubec collection). Steve Bissette was invited to create a cover for the anthology, a daunting task for a project which contained "23 stories by 56 different creators, all with different styles and subject material". Bisette's cover proved popular, but not ideal for Weird Business, so Dave Dorman (cover artist for multiple Star Wars and Aliens comics - including, the Stoker Award-winning Aliens: Tribes by S. Bissette) was contacted, and produced sketches deemed more suitable to the project.

Klaw recalls many "adventures, mishaps and even tragedies" during the course of the assembling process - Norm Partridge writing "Gorilla Gunslinger" despite suffering from chicken pox, artistic difficulties on a couple of stories with deadlines looming, and the unfortunate deaths of both Robert Bloch (before the book saw print) and Roger Zelazny (less than a month after its release).

When it reached publication Weird Business was nominated for the 1996 Eisner Award for Best Anthology, and became the "largest comic book of original material ever published in English," a proud accomplishment for so new a small publisher. This, however, proved something of a double-edged sword, since:

...it looked like a book, [so] the comic shops said they couldn't sell it to comic book fans. Booksellers said that since it was a comic book, not many book readers would be interested. Luckily, both parties were mostly wrong, but their prophecies turned out to be self-fulfilling.

Comic shops were, in 1995, still relatively new to the concept of selling slowly but continuously, being far more familiar with the speculator boom which saw massive sales for individual comics for a brief period of time, and few follow-up sales in subsequent weeks. Although Watchmen, The Dark Knight Returns and Maus were all making inroads as continually selling higher-priced trade paperbacks and graphic novels, Weird Business — although selling well — was perhaps slightly ahead of its time.

Klaw recalls that there were similar difficulties in marketing Weird Business to bookshops:

Book-length comics had been available in most bookstores since the late 80s, but stores couldn't figure out how to market or sell them... at [a] Bookstop in 1987, Watchmen and Dark Knight Returns were kept in the humor section!

By 1995, bookshops with a separate "Graphic Novels" section were becoming the norm, but staff knowledge and interest in them was still conflicted:

...[B]ookstores... had little respect for or understanding about how to sell them. Many felt that graphic novels were still primarily kiddie fare. Weird Business confused them. It listed all these well known writers, but it also had pictures. And it clearly wasn't for children. So in many stores it languished, hidden away from people who might be interested in the book.

Nonetheless, Weird Business was well received and sold well. Moreover, "it established the fledgling Mojo Press as a new player in the publishing business". Says Klaw:

Suddenly, it seemed that everyone who was anyone in comics, horror, and science fiction wanted to work with us.

== Creators associated with Mojo Press ==
Although Mojo Press was broadly formed for one purpose: to publish Joe R. Lansdale and Klaw's Weird Business, that anthology was neither its first nor its only title. In 1996, Mojo brought Michael Moorcock's Behold the Man back into print, and helped launch the career of cover artist and illustrator John Picacio. During 4-5 years, Klaw and Ostrander worked with many other big science fiction, fantasy, horror and comics names. Some, like Jean "Moebius" Giraud (whose Blueberry Saga: Confederate Gold was nominated for the 1997 Eisner Award for Best Archival Collection) and Michael Moorcock, were already legends in their respective fields; while others, like Picacio and comics artist Michael Lark, were at the start of their careers.

Other authors and artists who produced work for Mojo Press include: Y: The Last Man artist Pia Guerra, Hugo Award nominee Neal Barrett, Jr., underground comix artist Jack "Jaxon" Jackson, Too Much Coffee Man creator Shannon Wheeler, horror author Poppy Z. Brite, mythic fiction-pioneer Charles de Lint, mystery writer Bill Crider, comics creator Batton Lash, award-winning short story writer Scott A. Cupp, Harvey Award-winning comics artist Scott Hampton, multi award-winning sci-fi/fantasy legend Roger Zelazny, Danger Boy author Mark London Williams, artist and tattooer Jason Edward Morgan, comics artist and The Atheist author Phil Hester, comics artist John Lucas, sci-fi/fantasy illustrator Dave Dorman, and Star Wars and Conan comics writer Timothy Truman.

== Publications ==
- Creature Features by Richard Klaw (ed.) (Covers by Darrin LeBlanc and Kenneth Huey; design by LeBlanc) (1994) Graphic novel horror anthology
  - Other contributors include: Joe R. Lansdale • Ted Naifeh • Alan Hawthorne • Franz Henkel • Morgan • Bill D. Fountain • Christopher Gronlund • Tim Czarnecki • William Traxtle
- Weird Business Sampler (1994)
  - Includes excerpts from: The Introduction by Joe R. Lansdale • "Green Brother" by Howard Waldrop, adapted by Steve Utley, art by John Lucas • "Chip of Fools" by Chet Williamson, art by John Picacio • "Gorilla Gunslinger" by Norman Partridge, art by John Garcia • "In Repose" by Marc Paoletti, art by Michael Lark) • "Stranger" by Brian Biggs
- Weird Business by Joe R. Lansdale and Richard Klaw (ed.s) (Introduction by Lansdale) (Cover by Dave Dorman) (Designed by Darrin LeBlanc) (1995)
  - Contributors include: Neal Barrett, Jr. • John Bergin • Ambrose Bierce • Brian Biggs • Robert Bloch • Poppy Z. Brite • Nancy Collins • Bill Crider • Charles de Lint • Bill D. Fountain • Pia Guerra • Matthew Guest • Franz Henkel • Phil Hester • Michael Lark • John Lucas • Paul O. Miles • Michael Moorcock • Ted Naifeh • Ande Parks • Norman Partridge • Omaha Perez • John Picacio • Edgar Allan Poe • Doug Potter • Dean Rohrer • Al Sarrantonio • Howard Waldrop • Chet Williamson • F. Paul Wilson • Roger Zelazny • et al.
- The Tell Tale Heart by Edgar Allan Poe, Illustrated by Bill D. Fountain (1995) Stories and Poems by Poe
- Behold the Man: The Thirtieth Anniversary Edition by Michael Moorcock (Introduction by Jonathan Carroll) (Cover, interior illustrations and design by John Picacio) (1996)
- Wild West Show by Richard Klaw (ed.) (Cover by Timothy Truman) (Introduction by Scott A. Cupp) (1996) Western graphic novel anthology
  - Contributors include: Joe R. Lansdale • Lewis Shiner • Sam Glanzman • Kevin Hendryx • Newt Manwich • Neal Barrett, Jr. • Norman Partridge • Doug Potter • Marc Erickson • Martin Thomas • Michael Washburn • Paul O. Miles • Steve Utley • Don Webb • John Lucas • John Garcia • Joe Preston
- Dead Heat by Del Stone, Jr. (Illustrated by Dave Dorman and Scott Hampton) (1996) Zombie biker post apocalyptic novel
  - Winner of the 1996 International Horror Guild (IHG) Award for Best First Novel. Nominated for the 1996 Bram Stoker Award for Best First Novel.
- The Blueberry Saga: Confederate Gold by Jean-Michel Charlier and Jean "Moebius" Giraud (Introduction by Elmer Kelton) (1996) B/W collection of classic French graphic novel western
  - Collects Chihuahua Pearl, The Half-A-Million Dollar Man, Ballad For a Coffin, The Outlaw, Angle Face, and Three Black Birds
- The Big Bigfoot Book by Richard Klaw (ed.) (Covers by Mark A. Nelson and Ted Naifeh) (Design by Doug Potter) (1996) Anthology of original Bigfoot stories
  - Contributors include: Mark London Williams • Phil Hester • Joe Pruett • A.A. Attanosio • John Bergin • Neal Barrett, Jr. • Bill D. Fountain • Norman Partridge • Fernando Ramirez • Batton Lash • William Browning Spencer • Newt Manwich • Paul O. Miles • Dan Burr
- Atomic Chili: The Illustrated Joe R. Lansdale by Joe R. Lansdale (Introduction by Timothy Truman) (Cover by Dave Dorman) (Design by John Picacio) (1996) Comics adaptations
  - Contributors include: Ted Naifeh • Neal Barrett, Jr. • John Garcia • Jerry Prosser • Dean Rohrer • Marc Erickson • Jack "Jaxon" Jackson • Phil Hester • Tom Foxmarnick • John Lucas • William Traxtle • Stephen R. Bissette • Mark A. Nelson • George Pratt • Fernando Ramirez • Michael Zulli
- Gorilla Gunslinger: Meet Monjo... by Norman Partridge (writer) and Mark Erickson (artist) (1996) Nine page sampler
  - Promoted the never-completed original western graphic novel Gorilla Gunslinger: The Good, the Bad... and the Gorilla
- Occurrences: The Illustrated Ambrose Bierce by Ambrose Bierce, adapted by Debra Rodia (Cover and design by John Picacio) (1997) Stories adapted into comics
  - Contributing artists include: Michael Lark • John Lucas • Martin Thomas • Mark Ricketts • Richard Case
- Bad Chili by Joe R. Lansdale (Cover and design by John Picacio) (1997)
  - 500 Copies. All copies were signed by both writer and artist.
- Tales from the Texas Woods by Michael Moorcock (Cover and design by John Picacio) (1997) Collection of stories and essays
- Wake Up and Smell the Cartoons of Shannon Wheeler (Introduction by Jeff Smith) (Design by Martin Thomas) (1997) HB Collection of Shannon Wheeler cartoons
  - Wake Up and Smell the Cartoons of Shannon Wheeler (1997) PB ISBN 1-885418-18-3
- Red Range by Joe R. Lansdale (writer) and Sam Glanzman (artist) (1999) Original western graphic novel
- Indian Lover: Sam Houston & the Cherokees by Jack "Jaxon" Jackson (Introduction by Randolph B. Campbell) (Cover by Sam Yeates) (1999) Historical western graphic novel
- The Hereafter Gang by Neal Barrett, Jr. (1999) Novel
- Interstate Dreams by Neal Barrett, Jr. (1999) Novel
