= Trail of Bones =

Trail of Bones might refer to:

- The southern route of the Silk Road that traversed the Karakoram Pass.
- Trail Of Bones: More Cases From The Files Of A Forensic Anthropologist, a book by American anthropologist Mary H. Manheim.
- "Trail of Bones", one of the novels in the Danger Boy series written by Mark London Williams.
