= The Coffee Song =

1946 song written by Bob Hilliard and Dick Miles

Sheet music cover featuring Frank Sinatra, 1946

"The Coffee Song" (occasionally subtitled "They've Got an Awful Lot of Coffee in Brazil") is a novelty song written by Bob Hilliard and Dick Miles, first recorded by Frank Sinatra in 1946. Later that year it was recorded by The Smart Set, and by others in later years.

The song caricatures Brazil's coffee surplus, jokingly claiming that no other beverages are available. Snowclones on this phrase have been used in analyses of the coffee industry, and of the Brazilian economy and culture.

Sinatra re-recorded the song in 1960 for Ring-a-Ding-Ding!, his inaugural Reprise release.

== Notable cover versions ==
The song has been performed by (among others) Louis Prima, The Andrews Sisters, Sam Cooke, The Smart Set, Rosemary Clooney, Eydie Gormé, Mike Doughty, Stan Ridgway, Soul Coughing, Osibisa, Hildegard Knef, and the Muppets. Bob Dorough recorded the song for inclusion on Too Much Coffee Man, a CD of music based on the eponymous Shannon Wheeler character.

The Muppets performed the song as the opening number of a 1997 episode of Muppets Tonight.

== See also ==
- Coffee production in Brazil
- Coffee consumption in Brazil
