= SF Site =

Online science fiction magazine

- Editor: Rodger Turner
- Categories: Science fiction, fantasy
- Frequency: Bimonthly (until 2013)
- Format: Online magazine
- Circulation: 200K visitors per month
- Founder: John O'Neill; Rodger Turner
- First issue: June 1997; 29 years ago
- Country: Canada
- Based in: Ottawa, Ontario
- Language: English
- Website: sfsite.com (defunct), archived April 2023

SF Site was an online science fiction and fantasy magazine edited by Rodger Turner. Launched in 1997, it primarily published book reviews and won the Locus Award for Best Website in 2002. SF Site also provided web hosting services for science fiction magazines such as Analog, Asimov's, F&SF and Interzone. It was one of the oldest extant science fiction websites at the time of its shutdown in 2025.

== History ==
Established in June 1997 by John O'Neill and Rodger Turner, SF Site was an online magazine of science fiction and fantasy. It was based in Ottawa, Canada, but included contributors from around the world, and had 200,000 unique visitors per month in 2001. It primarily published reviews of science fiction books; it also reviewed films, television, and features interviews with authors and fiction excerpts. Contributors included Steven H Silver, Richard Lupoff, Rick Norwood, Victoria Strauss, Mark London Williams, and Rick Klaw.

Through its web hosting services, SF Site was responsible for bringing four major science fiction magazines – Analog, Asimov's, F&SF and Interzone – to the Internet. It also hosted science fiction and fantasy authors such as Steven Erikson and a fan-run website for Guy Gavriel Kay. It hosted a science fiction discussion forum and RSS feed.

In December 2013, SF Site suspended production of regular twice-monthly updates, due to declining advertising revenue. Its news blog was placed on hiatus in 2018. SF Site became defunct after Turner's death in 2025, at which time it was one of the oldest extant science fiction websites.

== Reception ==
In 2000 editor Gardner Dozois, writing in The Mammoth Book of Best New SF, described SF Site as one of the most important genre-related websites on the internet. Zachary Houle wrote in the Ottawa Citizen in 2001, "Over four short years, [SF Site] has become a big player in broadening the appeal of speculative fiction—the SF referred to in its name" and said, "the site is also highly regarded by the major publishing houses, which generously lift quotes from the site's reviews for book-cover blurbs".

SF Site won the 2002 Locus Award for Best Website, and was a nominee for the 2002 Hugo Award in the same category. It was also nominated for the World Fantasy Award for Non-Professional Work in 2004 and 2006.
