= Robert E. Howard's Savage Sword =

Publication information
- Publisher: Dark Horse Comics
- Schedule: Sporadic
- Genre: Anthology
- Publication date: December 2010 – April 2015

Robert E. Howard's Savage Sword was an anthology comic published by Dark Horse Comics showcasing the exploits of Howard's heroes in new adventures and restored reprints of classic tales. All contents were based on or inspired by the works of Robert E. Howard. The series ended with issue number 10.

== Publishing history ==
=== Issues ===
Issue	Date	Titles Featured	Series	Format	Story	Art	Color	Cover
1	December 22, 2010	Conan and the Jewels of Hesterm (Part One)	Conan	New comic	Paul Tobin	Wellinton Alves	Michael Atiyen	Esad Ribic
1	December 22, 2010	John Silent: The Earthbound Dead	Solomon Kane	New comic	Scott Allie	Ben Dewey	Dave Stewart	Esad Ribic
1	December 22, 2010	Six Guns and Scimitars: The Wild West in the Middle East	El Borak	New short story	Mark Finn	Tim Bradstreet	N/A	Esad Ribic
1	December 22, 2010	Dark Agnes: Storytelling (Part One)	Dark Agnes	New comic	Marc Andreyko	Robert Atkins (pencils); Rebecca Buchman (inks)	Michelle Madsen	Esad Ribic
1	December 22, 2010	Worms of the Earth	Bran Mak Morn	Reprint comic	Roy Thomas	Barry Windsor-Smith & Tim Conrad	Jim Campbell	Esad Ribic
2	May 25, 2011	El Borak: The Incident at Hakim's Rest	El Borak	New comic	Mark Finn	Greg Scott	Grant Goleash	Tim Bradstreet & Grant Goleash
2	May 25, 2011	Dark Agnes: Storytelling (Part Two)	Dark Agnes	New comic	Marc Andreyko	Robert Atkins (pencils); Rebecca Buchman (inks)	Michelle Madsen	Tim Bradstreet & Grant Goleash
2	May 25, 2011	Sailor Steve Costigan: A New Game for Costigan	Sailor Steve Costigan	New comic	Joe Casey	Pop Mhan	José Villarrubia	Tim Bradstreet & Grant Goleash
2	May 25, 2011	Sea Curse	The Faring Town Saga	Reprint short story	Robert E. Howard	Tim Seeley	N/A	Tim Bradstreet & Grant Goleash
2	May 25, 2011	The Valley of the Worm	James Allison	Reprint comic	Ron Thomas & Gerry Conway	Gil Kane (pencils); Ernie Chua (inks)	Dan Jackson	Tim Bradstreet & Grant Goleash
2	May 25, 2011	Conan and the Jewels of Hesterm (Part Two)	Conan	New comic	Paul Tobin	Wellinton Alves	Michael Atiyen	Tim Bradstreet & Grant Goleash
3	October 19, 2011	Conan and the Jewels of Hesterm (Part Three)	Conan	New comic	Paul Tobin	Wellinton Alves	Michael Atiyen	Gerald Parel
3	October 19, 2011	The Sonora Kid: Knife, Bullet, and Noose (Part One)	The Sonora Kid	New comic	Jeremy Barlow	Tony Parker	Brian Miller	Gerald Parel
3	October 19, 2011	Brule: The Spear and the Siren (Part One)	Brule	New comic	David Lapham	Fabio Cobiaco	Dan Jackson	Gerald Parel
3	October 19, 2011	Steve Harrison: Pinot Noir	Steve Harrison	New comic	Joshua Williamson	Patric Reynolds	Dan Jackson	Gerald Parel
3	October 19, 2011	Kull: The Vale of Shadow (Part One)	Kull	Reprint comic	Alan Zelenetz	Tony de Zuniga	Michael Heisler	Gerald Parel
4	March 14, 2012	Brule: The Spear and the Siren (Part Two)	Brule	New comic	David Lapham	Fabio Cobiaco	Dan Jackson	Cary Nord & Dave Stewart
4	March 14, 2012	The Sonora Kid: Knife, Bullet, and Noose (Part Two)	The Sonora Kid	New comic	Jeremy Barlow	Tony Parker	Brian Miller	Cary Nord & Dave Stewart
4	March 14, 2012	Conan: White Death	Conan	New comic	Pete Doree	Sean Phillips		Cary Nord & Dave Stewart
4	March 14, 2012	The Thing on the Roof	Cthulhu Mythos	New comic	Dave Land	M.S. Corley		Cary Nord & Dave Stewart
4	March 14, 2012	Kull: The Vale of Shadow (Part Two)	Kull	Reprint comic	Alan Zelenetz	Tony de Zuniga	Michael Heisler	Cary Nord & Dave Stewart
5	August 15, 2012	Bran Mak Morn: Men of the Shadows (Part One)	Bran Mak Morn	New comic	Ian Edginton	Richard Pace	Moose Baumann	Raymond Swanland
5	August 15, 2012	In the Forest of Villefere	De Montour	New comic	Steve Niles	Chris Mitten	Michelle Madsen	Raymond Swanland
5	August 15, 2012	King Conan: Two Birds...	Conan	New comic	Howard Chaykin		Jesus Aburto	Raymond Swanland
5	August 15, 2012	Dark Agnes: Sword Woman (Part One)	Dark Agnes	New comic	Paul Tobin	Francesco Francavilla		Raymond Swanland
5	August 15, 2012	Kings of the Night	Bran Mak Morn / Kull	Reprint comic	Roy Thomas	David Wenzel	Jim Campbell	Raymond Swanland
6	November 27, 2013	Conan: Sargasso of Sand	Conan	New comic	John Jackson Miller	Philip Tan	Jason Paz and Moose Baumann	Francesco Francavilla
6	November 27, 2013	Dark Agnes: Sword Woman (Part Two)	Dark Agnes	New comic	Paul Tobin	Aaron McConnell		Francesco Francavilla
6	November 27, 2013	Bran Mak Morn: Men of the Shadows (Part Two)	Bran Mak Morn	New comic	Ian Edginton	Richard Pace	Moose Baumann	Francesco Francavilla
6	November 27, 2013	Conan: Demons of the Summit	Conan	Reprint comic	Roy Thomas (Adapted from Björn Nyberg)	Tony de Zuniga	Jim Campbell	Francesco Francavilla
6	November 27, 2013	Conan: Child of Sorcery	Conan	Reprint comic	Roy Thomas (Adapted from Christy Marx)	Ernie Chan	Jim Campbell	Francesco Francavilla
7	January 29, 2014	Dark Agnes: Sword Woman (Part Three)	Dark Agnes	New comic	Paul Tobin	Aaron McConnell		Nic Klein
7	January 29, 2014	Breckinridge Elkins: Mountain Man (Part One)	Breckinridge Elkins	New comic	Gary Chaloner			Nic Klein
7	January 29, 2014	Bran Mak Morn: Men of the Shadows (Part Three)	Bran Mak Morn	New comic	Ian Edginton	Richard Pace	Moose Baumann	Nic Klein
7	January 29, 2014	Conan: The Bargain	Conan	New comic	Jai Nitz	Kevin MacGuire	Rosemary Cheetham	Nic Klein
7	January 29, 2014	Island of Pirates' Doom	Valeria	Reprint comic	Roy Thomas	John Buscema & Danny Bulanadi	Jim Campbell	Nic Klein
8	June 11, 2014	Solomon Kane: Maid of Winter's Night	Solomon Kane	New comic	Dan Jolley	John Nadeau		Philip Tan & Romulo Fajardo Jr.
8	June 11, 2014	Daily Hyborean Life	Conan	New comic	John Arcudi	Franck Biancarelli		Philip Tan & Romulo Fajardo Jr.
8	June 11, 2014	Conrad and Kirowan: A Book and its Cover (Part One)	Conrad and Kirowan	New comic	Paul Tobin	Alberto Alburquerque	Montse Martín	Philip Tan & Romulo Fajardo Jr.
8	June 11, 2014	Breckinridge Elkins: Mountain Man (Part Two)	Breckinridge Elkins	New comic	Gary Chaloner			Philip Tan & Romulo Fajardo Jr.
8	June 11, 2014	The Tower of the Elephant	Conan	Reprint comic	Roy Thomas	John Buscema & Alfredo Alcala	Moose Baumann	Philip Tan & Romulo Fajardo Jr.
9	September 24, 2014	Conan: Den of the Pleasure Goddess	Conan	New comic	Jim Mitchell	Freddie Williams II		Ariel Olvetti
9	September 24, 2014	Sailor Steve Costigan: Paper Tiger	Sailor Steve Costigan	New comic	Arie Kaplan	Douglas Franchin	Aris Aguiar	Ariel Olvetti
9	September 24, 2014	Conrad and Kirowan: A Book and its Cover (Part Two)	Conrad and Kirowan	New comic	Paul Tobin	Alberto Alburquerque	Montse Martín	Ariel Olvetti
9	September 24, 2014	Breckinridge Elkins: Mountain Man (Part Three)	Breckinridge Elkins	New comic	Gary Chaloner			Ariel Olvetti
9	September 24, 2014	Conan: Black Colossus	Conan	Reprint comic	Roy Thomas	John Buscema & Alfredo Alcala	Jim Campbell	Ariel Olvetti
10	April 1, 2015	Conan: Night of the Wolves	Conan	New comic	John Ostrander	Andy Kuhn	Nick Filardi	Benjamin Carré
10	April 1, 2015	The Gods of Bal-Sagoth (Part One)	Black Turlogh	New comic	Alex de Campi	Marc Laming	Warren Wucinich	Benjamin Carré
10	April 1, 2015	Solomon Kane: The Sea Dog's Tale	Solomon Kane	New comic	Ron Marz	Rich Clark		Benjamin Carré
10	April 1, 2015	Demon in a Silvered Glass	Kull	Reprint comic	Doug Moench	John Bolton	Jim Campbell	Benjamin Carré

=== Collections ===
Volume	Collects	Cover	Published	ISBN
1	From Robert E. Howard's Savage Sword #1-4: Conan and the Jewels of Hesterm; John Silent: The Earthbound Dead; Six Guns and Scimitars: The Wild West in the Middle East; El Borak: The Incident at Hakim's Rest; Dark Agnes: Storytelling; Sailor Steve Costigan: A New Game for Costigan; Sea Curse; The Sonora Kid: Knife, Bullet, and Noose; Brule: The Spear and the Siren; Steve Harrison: Pinot Noir; The Thing on the Roof; Conan: White Death	Gerald Parel	January 9, 2013	978-1-61655-075-2
2	From Robert E. Howard's Savage Sword #5-8	Raymond Swanland	January 21, 2015	978-1-61655-680-8
