= Dead Heat (Stone novel) =

1996 novel by Del Stone, Jr.

- Language: English
- Publisher: Mojo Press
- Publication date: 1996

Dead Heat is a novel by Del Stone, Jr. It was published in 1996 by Mojo Press, with illustrations by Dave Dorman and Scott Hampton. It is based on and contains portions from Stone's previous works in Roadkill (Caliber Comics, 1993) and December (Hero Illustrated, 1994). The novel won the 1996 International Horror Guild Award for best first novel and was a finalist for the Bram Stoker Award for best first novel by an author offered by the Horror Writers Association.

== Plot ==
Based on the character Hitch created by Dave Dorman, Dead Heat tells the tale of a research facility in the Australian desert after an accident occurs; mutated DNA causes the mindless dead to rise up as zombies. As the undead population begins to outnumber the living, one zombie among them – Hitch – retains memories of his living existence and feels emotion. This sends him on a road trip to discover why he is seemingly the only zombie of this nature. His travels take him to Texas, where a psychotic man fashioning himself after Hitler hopes to enslave the world's remaining living people; to Michigan, where a band of survivalists try to destroy him; and finally to the Desert Southwest, where an otherworldly creature has begun creating grotesque undead hybrids out of various body parts.
