= Too Much Coffee Man =

Satirical cartoon character

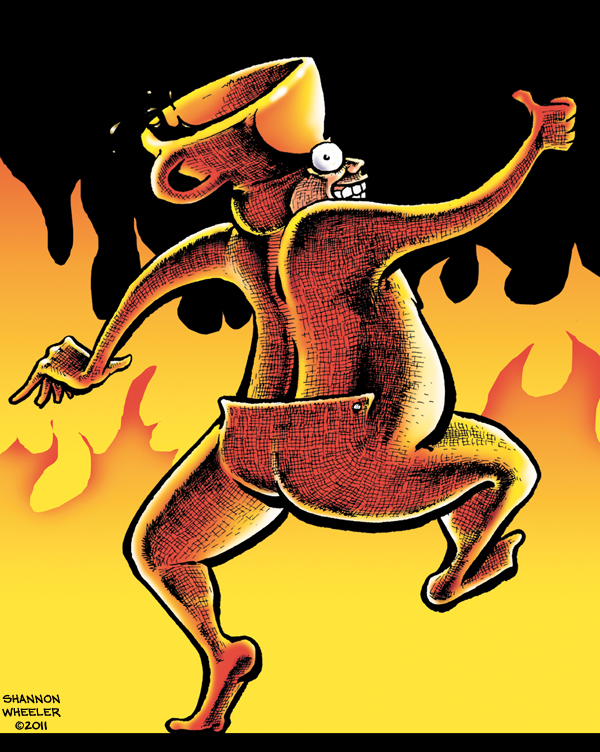
- Too Much Coffee Man; Art by Shannon Wheeler.

Publication information
- Publisher: Adhesive Comics (1993–2005); Dark Horse Comics (1994–2011); Boom Studios (2012)
- First appearance: Too Much Coffee Man Minicomic (1991)
- Created by: Shannon Wheeler

In-story information
- Species: Human?
- Place of origin: Coffee shops and apartments on Earth
- Partnerships: Nicoteenager; Too Much Espresso Guy; Too Much German White Chocolate Woman With Almonds; Underwater Guy; Mystery Woman
- Abilities: Existentialist debater
Too Much Coffee Man
Publication information
- Schedule: Irregular
- Format: Ongoing series
- Genre: Independent
- Publication date: July 1993 – Feb. 2005
- No. of issues: 20
- Main character: Too Much Coffee Man
Creative team
- Written by: Shannon Wheeler
- Artist: Shannon Wheeler
Collected editions
- Too Much Coffee Man Omnibus Plus: ISBN 9781506704029
- Too Much Coffee Man: Cutie Island and Other Stories: ISBN 9781608860982

Too Much Coffee Man (TMCM) is an American satirical superhero created by cartoonist Shannon Wheeler. Too Much Coffee Man wears what appears to be a spandex version of old-fashioned red "long johns" with a large mug attached atop his head. He is an anxious Everyman who broods about the state of the world, from politics to people, exchanging thoughts with friends and readers.

The strip is most often presented as a single page in alternative press newspapers, though occasionally the story arc stretches into multi-page stories. TMCM has appeared in comic strips, minicomics, webcomics, comic books, magazines, books, and operas. The Too Much Coffee Man comic book won the 1995 Eisner Award for Best New Series.

== Publication history ==
=== Creation ===
Too Much Coffee Man first appeared in 1991, in the Too Much Coffee Man Minicomic, as a self-promotion for Wheeler's book Children with Glue (Blackbird Comics, 1991). The minicomics, which appeared in many different formats, even one issued as a one-inch square, were self-published, photocopied, and handmade by Wheeler in initial runs of 300 black-and-white copies.

Wheeler said he created Too Much Coffee Man to make more accessible themes he had begun in a college newspaper. He said in 2011:

In 1991, I drew an autobiographical cartoon for The Daily Texan with themes of alienation and loneliness. When I described it, people's eyes glazed over. As a cheap gag, I started Too Much Coffee Man. I still address the same themes, except now there's coffee. People like coffee.

=== Newspaper strip ===
Too Much Coffee Man started as a one-page ongoing strip running in The Daily Texan in 1991. Over time, it became syndicated to a number of alternative weeklies throughout the U.S.

With the January 23, 2006, installment, the "Too Much Coffee Man" strip was retitled "How to Be Happy, with Too Much Coffee Man". On February 6, 2006, the title was simplified to "How to Be Happy", and Too Much Coffee Man did not appear in the strip again until January 21, 2008.

=== Comics ===
==== Solo title ====
Wheeler published four issues of the Too Much Coffee Man minicomic in 1991–1992.

Wheeler self-published the Too Much Coffee Man comic book via Adhesive Comics between 1993 and 2005. The first five issues were dated from July 1993 to February 1996. These were followed by three annual issues of Too Much Coffee Man's Color Special from 1996 to 1998. In July 1998, Adhesive released Too Much Coffee Man No. 8, thus skipping issues No. 6 and 7. After issue No. 10 (Dec. 2000), the comic became Too Much Coffee Man Magazine, featuring stories, articles, and reviews alongside TMCM material.

==== Appearances in other titles ====
Too Much Coffee Man strips appeared in the Austin, Texas-based anthology, Jab issues #1–4 and No. 6, published by Wheeler's own imprint Adhesive Comics from 1992 to 1995.

In 1994, TMCM appeared in the independent anthology Hands Off!, published by Washington Citizens for Fairness.

From 1994 to 1996, Too Much Coffee Man stories ran in the Dark Horse Comics anthology series Dark Horse Presents, in issues #92–95, and #100–111. Dark Horse collected all the TMCM stories from Dark Horse Presents in the 1997 special Too Much Coffee Man "Saves the Universe".

1997 was a banner year for Too Much Coffee Man, with stories in the SPX: Small Press Expo anthology, Caliber Press's Negative Burn No. 50, the Head Press anthology No Justice, No Piece!, and the trade paperback Wake Up and Smell the Cartoons of Shannon Wheeler, published by Mojo Press.

In 1998, TMCM stories were printed in Oni Double Feature No. 2 and Judge Dredd Megazine vol. 3, No. 41.

From 1999 to 2002, Too Much Coffee Man stories ran in the Dark Horse Comics anthology series Dark Horse Extra, in issues No. 8, 10–13, 41–43, and 48.

In 2011, TMCM appeared in the Madman 20th Anniversary Monster!, published by Image Comics, and War of the Independents No. 1, published by Red Anvil.

In 2013, TMCM was featured in a three-issue how-to guide on submitting comics to the digital comics platform ComiXology. In 2014, TMCM stories appeared in BANG! The Entertainment Paper #7–8.

=== Online ===
With the earnings from a Converse shoe commercial, Wheeler purchased a computer, launched his website tmcm.com on December 7, 1995, and began posting his comics online. He continues to post new and newly colored Too Much Coffee Man cartoons on his website every week..

== Plot and characters ==
Through multi-layered narratives, the comic explores issues of politics and the toils of urban society, often through the lens of the comics scene and coffee shop culture. In addition to the titular character, the creator of the strip often appears as a character, as does a "reader" character.

Too Much Coffee Man — Although he spends most time in his apartment or at the local coffee shop debating with his often pessimistic cohorts, Too Much Coffee Man is capable of going into a "manic paranoid frenzy" in combat, allowing him to pulverize opponents. He gains his amazing powers from coffee and cigarettes – he distills his extra potent espresso mix in a secret laboratory above the coffee shop. TMCM rarely sleeps and his nerves are shot from an excess of caffeine. He has also been in outer space and in a U.S. prison. Visually, the character is a parody of superheroes, which since their inception have been colloquially referred to by industry professionals as "long-underwear characters". Too Much Coffee Man wears literal long underwear, dressing in what appears to be a spandex version of old-fashioned red "long johns" (full-body underwear with a buttoned flap on the back for bodily functions) with a large mug attached atop his head; it remains unclear whether he is wearing it or whether it is physically part of him.

Too Much Espresso Guy — Too Much Coffee Man's cynical friend. The espresso cup atop his head is strapped on in an obvious way. He is addicted to alcohol, is vaguely narcissistic, often swaps between left and right-wing views, and is perpetually annoyed by Too Much Coffee Man and Too Much German White Chocolate Woman With Almonds, who he believes to be stupid.

Too Much German White Chocolate Woman With Almonds — their mutual friend. She is pale-skinned, worries a lot, and has large almonds on her face. She is skilled at making cakes, and also possesses the ability to detach her almonds, which are allegedly edible. She is nicer than Espresso Guy, causing them to often be antagonists.

Underwater Guy — another mutual friend, who wears a wetsuit with a diving snorkel and mask. He first appeared in the early comics and was almost entirely unspeaking. He was later retconned into being their new friend in later comics. He presumably has the power to breathe underwater indefinitely.

Mystery Woman — Too Much Coffee Man's secret love.

Trademark Copyright Man — Too Much Coffee Man's archenemy. They first fought when Too Much Coffee Man was sued by Trademark Copyright Man due to their initials both being TMCM and they both have a coffee cup strapped to their head, but Too Much Coffee Man presumably killed him after he ate his lawyer.

== Collected editions ==
- Too Much Coffee Man "Saves the Universe" (Dark Horse, July 1997)
- Too Much Coffee Man's Guide for the Perplexed (Dark Horse, 1998) ISBN 1-56971-289-1
- Too Much Coffee Man's Parade of Tirade (Dark Horse, 2000) ISBN 1-56971-437-1
- Too Much Coffee Man's Amusing Musings (Dark Horse, 2001) ISBN 1-56971-663-3
- How to be Happy (Dark Horse, 2005) ISBN 1-59307-353-4
- Screw Heaven, When I Die I'm Going to Mars (Dark Horse, 2007) ISBN 1-59307-820-X
- Too Much Coffee Man Omnibus (Dark Horse, August 2011) ISBN 1-59582-307-7 — collects all previous Dark Horse collections
- Too Much Coffee Man: Cutie Island and Other Stories (BOOM! Studios, March 2012) ISBN 1-60886-098-1

== In other media ==
=== Television ===
In 1994, Converse shoe company licensed the rights to use Too Much Coffee Man for a 15-second commercial spot, first airing during a Saturday Night Live episode. Marvel Comics and the cable television network Comedy Central were developing a potential animated series or special with the production company Nelvana in 2000 and 2001. However, the project was abandoned after both Wheeler and Comedy Central agreed that the script lacked quality.

=== Music ===
In 2000, jazz musician Bob Dorough recorded a CD entitled Too Much Coffee Man. The character appears on the cover, drawn by Shannon Wheeler, and there is a title track (originally intended to be music for an animated series based on the character) as well as a cover of the Richard Miles composition "The Coffee Song".

=== Opera ===
The Too Much Coffee Man Opera appeared on stage for the first time in 2006. Wheeler, fellow cartoonist Damian Willcox, and composer Daniel Steven Crafts adapted the strip into an opera. Too Much Coffee Man Opera debuted at Brunish Hall at the Center for Performing Arts in Portland, Oregon, on September 22, 2006. A sample performance, which preceded the debut, was given at the Opera America convention in Seattle, Washington. Wheeler later teamed with Portland-based comic Carolyn Main to write a second act. This new, extended version, dubbed Too Much Coffee Man: The Refill, debuted again at Brunish Hall in April 2008.

=== Video Games ===
Too Much Coffee Man was included as a bonus multiplayer model in Half-Life: Further Data, released in early 1999. He was added to the base game in celebration of the game's 25 year anniversary.

Miscellaneous

Artist Shannon Wheeler drew Too Much Coffee Man for an appearance on Rootless Coffee Co.'s HYPERSPACE coffee line.
