= Shannon Wheeler =

American cartoonist (born 1966)

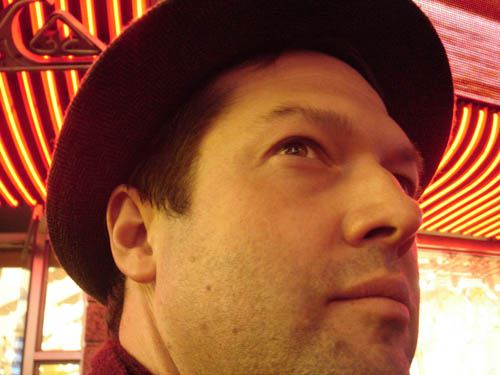
- Shannon Wheeler
- Areas: Cartoonist, Publisher
- Notable works: Too Much Coffee Man
- Awards: Eisner Award, 1995, 2011

Shannon Wheeler is an American cartoonist, best known as a cartoonist for The New Yorker and for creating the satirical superhero Too Much Coffee Man.

== Early life ==
Shannon Wheeler grew up in Berkeley, California, brought up by his mother. His father left the family to start a commune north of San Francisco. Wheeler also has two half-sisters. Wheeler attended the Walden Center and School. He later attended Berkeley High School, eventually graduating from the University of California, Berkeley, with a degree in architecture in 1989.

== Career ==
He started cartooning while at UC Berkeley, publishing his daily gag cartoons Calaboose and then Tooth and Justice in The Daily Californian.

Around 1990, he moved to Austin, Texas, a state he had visited multiple times as a child to see family. In Austin, Wheeler continued Tooth and Justice for the University of Texas student paper The Daily Texan. Ending that strip, he published other daily cartoons with the paper, with titles like Life and Times and Interlude.

In 1991, Wheeler created the satirical superhero Too Much Coffee Man to star in a minicomic promoting Children with Glue, a collection of his daily strips. The popularity of Too Much Coffee Man led to the character starring in a weekly comic strip in 1991. The character appeared in a series of self-published zines, comic books, magazines, and webcomics for a number of years. After Wheeler moved to Portland, Oregon, in 1998, Dark Horse Comics (based nearby) began publishing TMCM collections. In 2006 Wheeler and Daniel Steven Crafts co-produced the Too Much Coffee Man Opera (in one act), followed by Too Much Coffee Man Opera, The Refill (in two acts) in 2008. Dark Horse released the ultimate TMCM collection in 2011, the Too Much Coffee Man Omnibus; while BOOM! Studios released Too Much Coffee Man: Cutie Island and Other Stories in 2012.

From 2004 until 2008, Wheeler contributed to many of the Idiot's Guide books.

His weekly strip Postage Stamp Funnies appeared in the satirical newspaper The Onion until 2009, when he began contributing to The New Yorker magazine. In 2010, Boom! Studios published a collection of Wheeler's cartoons that had been rejected by The New Yorker called I Thought You Would Be Funnier. While initially left off the ballot for the Eisner Awards for 2011, the book went on to win Best Humor publication that year.

== Personal life ==
Wheeler lives in Portland, Oregon, with his twin sons.

== Awards ==
- Hatch Broadcasting Award (for a Converse shoe commercial featuring Too Much Coffee Man)
- 1995 Eisner Award for Best New Series: Too Much Coffee Man, by Shannon Wheeler (Adhesive Comics)
- 2011 Eisner Award for Best Humor Publication: I Thought You Would Be Funnier, by Shannon Wheeler (Boom! Studios)
- 2011 nomination, Harvey Award, Special Award for Humor in Comics: I Thought You Would Be Funnier, by Shannon Wheeler (Boom! Studios) nomination.
- 2018 Inkpot Award winner

== Bibliography ==
=== Solo work ===
- Children with Glue (self-published, 1989; reissued by Blackbird Comics, 1991)
- Too Much Coffee Man
  - Too Much Coffee Man Mini Comics (self-published, Austin, TX, 1991)
  - Too Much Coffee Man Comic Book (Adhesive Comics, Austin, TX, 1993–2001)
  - Too Much Coffee Man Webcomic by Shannon Wheeler (beginning in Austin, TX, 1995, ongoing)
  - Too Much Coffee Man's Guide for the Perplexed (Dark Horse, 1998) ISBN 1-56971-289-1
  - Too Much Coffee Man's Parade of Tirade (Dark Horse, 2000) ISBN 1-56971-437-1 – introduction by Henry Rollins
  - Too Much Coffee Man's Amusing Musings (Dark Horse, 2001) ISBN 1-56971-663-3
  - Too Much Coffee Man Magazine (Adhesive Comics, Portland, OR, 2002–2006)
  - How to be Happy (Too Much Coffee Man) (Dark Horse, 2005) ISBN 1-59307-353-4
  - Too Much Coffee Man Omnibus (Dark Horse, August 2011) ISBN 1-59582-307-7
  - Too Much Coffee Man: Cutie Island and Other Stories (BOOM! Studios, March 2012) ISBN 1-60886-098-1
- Wake Up and Smell the Cartoons of Shannon Wheeler (Mojo Press, 1997) ISBN 1-885418-18-3 – introduction by Jeff Smith
- Screw Heaven, When I Die I'm Going to Mars (Dark Horse, 2007) ISBN 1-59307-820-X
- Postage Stamp Funnies (Dark Horse, 2008) ISBN 1-59307-983-4
- I Thought You Would Be Funnier (BOOM! Studios, 2010) ISBN 1-60886-034-5
- I Told You So (BOOM! Studios, May 2012) ISBN 1-60886-093-0
- Astounding Villain House (Dark Horse, October 2013)

=== Collaborative works ===
- Waiting for Justice, columns by Carolyn Jones, cartoons by Wheeler (The Daily Californian, Berkeley, California, 1987)
- Jab (Adhesive Comics, 1992–1995) – Austin, Texas–based anthology featuring Wheeler, Wiley Akins, Ashley Underwood, Tom King, Walt Holcombe, Rob Bostick, Mitchelle Crisp, Matthew Dutchman, Jason Storey, John Bruch, Lance Myers, Rick Klaw, and Joe Don Baker
- Do I Come Here Often? (Black Coffee Blues, Pt. 2), written by Henry Rollins, illustrated by Wheeler (2.13.61, 1998)
- Jobs That Don't Suck: What Nobody Else Will Tell You About Getting and Succeeding in the Job of Your Dreams, written by Charlie Drozdyk, illustrated by Wheeler (Ballantine Books, 1998) ISBN 0345424263
- Grandpa Won't Wake Up, written by Simon Max Hill, illustrated by Wheeler (BOOM! Studios, October 2011) ISBN 1-60886-092-2
- Oil & Water, written by Steve Duin, illustrated by Wheeler (Fantagraphics, November 2011) ISBN 1-60699-492-1
- God is Disappointed in You, written by Mark Russell, cartoons by Wheeler (Top Shelf, 2012) ISBN 978-1-60309-098-8

== Stage ==
- Too Much Coffee Man Opera (creator, co-librettist, producer) with Daniel Steven Crafts
- Too Much Coffee Man Opera, The Refill (creator, co-librettist, producer) with Daniel Steven Crafts
