= Conan (Dark Horse Comics) =

Comic book series published by Dark Horse Comics

- Double-page spread from Conan the Legend #0 by Cary Nord

Publication information
- Publisher: Dark Horse Comics
- Schedule: Monthly
- Genre: Sword and sorcery
- Publication date: November 2003 – February 2018
- No. of issues: 240 (including one-shots and mini-series)

Conan, the sword-and-sorcery character created by Robert E. Howard, is the protagonist of seven major comic series published by Dark Horse Comics. The first series, titled simply Conan, ran for 50 issues from 2004 to 2008; the second, titled Conan the Cimmerian, began publication in 2008 and lasted 25 issues until 2010; the third series, titled Conan: Road of Kings, started publishing in December 2010 and ended in January 2012 after 12 issues; a fourth series, titled Conan the Barbarian, continuing from Road of Kings, lasted 25 issues from February 2012 to March 2014; a fifth series, titled Conan the Avenger, started publishing in April 2014 and ended in April 2016 after 25 issues; a sixth and final series, titled Conan the Slayer lasted 12 issues from July 2016 to August 2017.

Another series, titled King Conan, which takes place during Conan's time as king, ran in parallel for 24 issues from February 2011 to March 2016. Dark Horse also published half a dozen one-shots and almost a dozen mini-series.

Dark Horse also published collections of the original Marvel Comics Conan the Barbarian, The Savage Sword of Conan [the Barbarian] and King Conan series in graphic novel format.

The publishing rights for Conan the Barbarian returned to Marvel Comics in 2018.

== Overview ==
Dark Horse Comics began their take on Conan in 2003 with a one-shot prologue, Conan #0: Conan the Legend.

The Conan, Conan the Cimmerian, Conan: Road of Kings, Conan the Barbarian, Conan the Avenger and Conan the Slayer series incorporate both new material and adaptations of stories by Robert E. Howard, with no other connection to Marvel Comics series or other post-Howard material. An ongoing dialogue between two characters, the Prince and the Wazir, living in an age centuries in Conan's future, is often used as a framing device for the stories.

Each issue also contains "The Adventures of Two-Gun Bob (True Stories from the Life of Robert E. Howard)" by Jim and Ruth Keegan.

=== Core appearances ===
- Conan #0: The Legend (2003), 1 issue
- Conan (2004–2008), 50 issues
- Conan and the Daughters of Midora (2004), 1 issue
- Conan and the Jewels of Gwahlur (2005), 3 issues
- Conan and the Demons of Khitai (2005–2006), 4 issues
- Conan: Book of Thoth (2006), 4 issues
- Conan: Free Comic Book Day Edition (2006), 1 issue
- Conan and the Songs of the Dead (2006), 5 issues
- Hyborian Adventures: SDCC Free Giveaway (2006), 1 issue
- Conan and the Midnight God (2007), 5 issues
- Conan: Trophy (2007), 1 online eight-page issue
- Conan the Cimmerian (2008–2010), 26 issues
- Conan and the Mad King of Gaul (2009), 2 online eight-page issues
- Conan: The Weight of the Crown (2010), 1 issue
- Conan: Kiss of the Undead (2010), 1 online eight-page issue
- Conan: Road of Kings (2010–2012), 12 issues
- Robert E. Howard's Savage Sword (2010–2015), 10 issues
- King Conan (2011–2016), 24 issues
- Conan: Island of No Return (2011), 2 issues
- Conan the Barbarian (2012–2014), 25 issues
- Conan: Children of the Sun (2012), 1 online eight-page issue
- Conan: The Phantoms of the Black Coast (2012–2013), 5 issues
- Conan and the People of the Black Circle (2013–2014), 4 issues
- Conan the Avenger (2014–2016), 25 issues
- Conan/Red Sonja (2015), 4 issues
- Red Sonja/Conan (2015), 4 issues
- Conan the Slayer (2016–2017), 12 issues
- Wonder Woman/Conan (2017–2018), 6 issues

== Conan ==
The six main Dark Horse Conan series, Conan, Conan the Cimmerian, Conan: Road of Kings, Conan the Barbarian, Conan the Avenger and Conan the Slayer make up a larger continuous storyline. This is indicated by numbering on the inner cover of these books with the text, "Number [#] in a series".

=== Conan ===
Conan was Dark Horse Comics' first series about Conan the Cimmerian. Cary Nord's art consists of only color and pencilwork, with no inkwork, providing a painterly aesthetic. The series follows Dale Rippke's "Darkstorm" chronology. The story "Helm" in Conan #18 addresses one of the major "faults" in that chronology.

Issue	Date	Title	Story	Art	Color	Cover
#0	November 12, 2003	Conan the Legend	Kurt Busiek	Cary Nord	Dave Stewart	Cary Nord
#1	February, 2004	Out of the Darksome Hills	Kurt Busiek	Cary Nord	Dave Stewart	Original cover by Joseph Michael Linsner, Variant covers by Cary Nord; J. Scott Campbell
#2	March 24, 2004	The Frost-Giant's Daughter	Kurt Busiek, adapting Robert E. Howard's "The Frost-Giant's Daughter"	Cary Nord	Dave Stewart	Joseph Michael Linsner
#3	April 28, 2004	At the Back of the North Wind	Kurt Busiek	Cary Nord	Dave Stewart	Joseph Michael Linsner
#4	May 26, 2004	The Gates of Paradise	Kurt Busiek	Cary Nord	Dave Stewart	Joseph Michael Linsner
#5	June 23, 2004	Ashes and Dust	Kurt Busiek	Cary Nord	Dave Stewart	Joseph Michael Linsner
#6	July 28, 2004	Day of Farewell	Kurt Busiek	Cary Nord	Dave Stewart	Joseph Michael Linsner
#7	August 25, 2004	Blood for Blood	Kurt Busiek	Cary Nord	Dave Stewart	Joseph Michael Linsner
#8	September 22, 2004	Born on the Battlefield (Born on the Battlefield — Part 1)	Kurt Busiek	Greg Ruth		
#9	October 20, 2004	Two Nemedians Walk into a Bar	Kurt Busiek	Cary Nord; Thomas Yeates	Dave Stewart	Leinil Francis Yu
#10	November 17, 2004	The Temple of Kallian Publico	Kurt Busiek, adapting Robert E. Howard's "The God in the Bowl"	Cary Nord; Thomas Yeates	Dave Stewart	Leinil Francis Yu
#11	December 22, 2004	The God in the Bowl	Kurt Busiek, adapting Robert E. Howard's "The God in the Bowl"	Cary Nord; Thomas Yeates	Dave Stewart	Leinil Francis Yu
#12	January 26, 2005	The Hanumar Road	Kurt Busiek	Cary Nord; Thomas Yeates	Dave Stewart	Leinil Francis Yu
#13	February 23, 2005	The Devil Within	Kurt Busiek	Cary Nord; Thomas Yeates	Dave Stewart	Leinil Francis Yu
#14	March 23, 2005	The Ibis and the Serpent	Kurt Busiek	Cary Nord; Tom Mandrake; Thomas Yeates	Dave Stewart	Leinil Francis Yu
#15	April 20, 2005	Wolves in the Woods (Born on the Battlefield — Part 2)	Kurt Busiek	Greg Ruth		
#16	May 18, 2005	Horror on Uskuth Hill	Kurt Busiek	Cary Nord	Dave Stewart	Cary Nord; Dave Stewart
#17	June 22, 2005	The City of Thieves	Kurt Busiek	Cary Nord	Dave Stewart	Cary Nord; Dave Stewart
#18	July 20, 2005	Helm	Kurt Busiek; Fabian Nicieza	John Severin	Michelle Madsen	Cary Nord; Dave Stewart
#18	July 20, 2005	Conan's Favorite Joke	Kurt Busiek	Bruce Timm	Michelle Madsen	Cary Nord; Dave Stewart
#19	August 24, 2005	The Thing in the Temple	Kurt Busiek	Cary Nord	Dave Stewart	Cary Nord; Dave Stewart
#20	September 21, 2005	The Tower of the Elephant	Kurt Busiek, adapting Robert E. Howard's "The Tower of the Elephant"	Cary Nord	Dave Stewart	Ladrönn
#21	October 19, 2005	The Prince of Thieves	Kurt Busiek, adapting Robert E. Howard's "The Tower of the Elephant"	Cary Nord	Dave Stewart	Ladrönn
#22	November 23, 2005	The Heart of Yag-Kosha	Kurt Busiek, adapting Robert E. Howard's "The Tower of the Elephant"	Cary Nord	Dave Stewart	Ladrönn
#23	December 21, 2005	The Battle of Brita's Vale (Born on the Battlefield — Part 3)	Kurt Busiek	Greg Ruth		
#24	January 18, 2006	The Magistrate's Wife	Kurt Busiek	Cary Nord	Dave Stewart	Cary Nord; Dave Stewart
#25	February 15, 2006	The Hand of the Might	Kurt Busiek	Cary Nord	Dave Stewart	Tony Harris
#26	March 22, 2006	Seeds of Empire (A Tale of Princes – and, perhaps, of Kings!)	Kurt Busiek	Timothy Truman	Dave Stewart	Tony Harris
#27	April 19, 2006	The Blood-Stained Crown (A tale of those who tread The Path of Kings!)	Kurt Busiek	Timothy Truman	Dave Stewart	Tony Harris
#28	May 17, 2006	Storyteller	Kurt Busiek	Eric Powell	Dave Stewart	Tony Harris
#29	June 21, 2006	The Toad	Mike Mignola, adapting Robert E. Howard's synopsis "The Hall of the Dead"	Cary Nord	Dave Stewart	Tony Harris
#30	July 19, 2006	The Serpent	Mike Mignola, adapting Robert E. Howard's synopsis "The Hall of the Dead"	Cary Nord	Dave Stewart	Tony Harris
#31	August 16, 2006	The Hall of the Dead	Mike Mignola, adapting Robert E. Howard's synopsis "The Hall of the Dead"	Cary Nord	Dave Stewart	Tony Harris
#32	September 20, 2006	Wild Cimmerian Bull (Born on the Battlefield — Part 4)	Kurt Busiek	Greg Ruth		
#33	October 18, 2006	Dogs of the Hills	Timothy Truman	Cary Nord	Dave Stewart	Tony Harris
#34	November 22, 2006	The Sons of Bel	Timothy Truman	Cary Nord	Dave Stewart	Tony Harris
#35	December 20, 2006	They Shall Be Lords Again	Timothy Truman	Paul Lee	Dave Stewart	Tony Harris
#36	January 17, 2007	Silent to the Sea	Timothy Truman	Paul Lee	Dave Stewart	Tony Harris
#37	February 21, 2007	Rat's Den	Paul Lee	Cary Nord	Richard Isanove	Richard Isanove; Cary Nord
#38	March 21, 2007	The Maze	Paul Lee	Cary Nord	Richard Isanove	Richard Isanove; Cary Nord
#39	April 18, 2007	In the Tower of Tara-Teth	Kurt Busiek	Rafael Kayanan		Cary Nord
#40	May 16, 2007	The Tale of the Head	Timothy Truman	Paul Lee	Dave Stewart	Paul Lee
#41	June 20, 2007	Rogues at the Door	Timothy Truman, adapting Robert E. Howard's "Rogues In the House"	Cary Nord	Richard Isanove	Cary Nord
#42	July 18, 2007	Red House, Red Priest	Timothy Truman, adapting Robert E. Howard's "Rogues In the House"	Cary Nord	Richard Isanove	Cary Nord
#43	August 29, 2007	The Pits of Refuge	Timothy Truman, adapting Robert E. Howard's "Rogues In the House"	Tomas Giorello	Richard Isanove	Cary Nord
#44	October 3, 2007	Man vs. Beast	Timothy Truman, adapting Robert E. Howard's "Rogues In the House"	Cary Nord	Richard Isanove	Cary Nord
#45	October 17, 2007	Venarium (Born on the Battlefield — Part 5)	Kurt Busiek	Greg Ruth		
#46	November 21, 2007	Over the Walls (Born on the Battlefield — Part 6)	Kurt Busiek	Greg Ruth		
#47	December 19, 2007	The Spawn of Nergal (Cover title "The Hand of Nergal")	Timothy Truman, adapting Robert E. Howard's "The Hand of Nergal"	Tomàs Giorello	J.D. Mettler; Tony Shasteen	Tomàs Giorello
#48	January 23, 2008	Darkness Over Yaralet (Cover title "Darkness Rising")	Timothy Truman, adapting Robert E. Howard's "The Hand of Nergal"	Tomàs Giorello	J. D. Mettler	Tomàs Giorello
#49	February 20, 2008	Flesh for the Gods of the Night	Timothy Truman, adapting Robert E. Howard's "The Hand of Nergal"	Tomàs Giorello	José Villarrúbia	Tomàs Giorello
#50	May 7, 2008	The Hand of Nergal	Timothy Truman, adapting Robert E. Howard's "The Hand of Nergal"	Tomàs Giorello	José Villarrúbia	Tomàs Giorello

==== Controversy ====
Nude variant cover of Conan #24.

Starting at issue #24, Tony Harris became the cover artist. One of the first pieces of art Harris submitted to Conan editor Scott Allie was a fully nude version of the cover of #24. Allie inserted the artwork in a blurb at the back of Conan and the Demons of Khitai #3. This displeased some comic store owners, and Conan and the Demons of Khitai #3 was reprinted with a censored cover in the blurb. Even so, 4,000 copies of Conan #24 were printed with the nude cover, and distributed through the Diamond Dateline retail newsletter shrink-wrapped in black plastic.

==== Awards ====
- 4 Will Eisner Comic Industry Awards
- Best Single Issue or One-Shot: Conan #0: "The Legend "
- 4 Eagle Awards
- Favourite new comicbook: Conan

=== Conan the Cimmerian ===
Conan the Cimmerian was Dark Horse Comics' second series about Conan. A 99¢ issue #0 was published June 2008, followed by the first issue of the series in July (with the usual cover price of $2.99). The series ended with issue #25 in November 2010.

Issue	Date	Title	Writer	Penciller	Color	Cover
#0	June 25, 2008	Cimmeria	Timothy Truman	Tomás Giorello	José Villarrubia	Tomás Giorello
#1	July 16, 2008	Hunter's Moon	Timothy Truman	Tomás Giorello; Richard Corben	José Villarrubia	Original cover by Frank Cho, Variant cover by Joe Kubert
#2	August 13, 2008	Mark of the Wolf	Timothy Truman	Tomás Giorello; Richard Corben	José Villarrubia	Frank Cho
#3	September 17, 2008	Path of Mist	Timothy Truman	Tomás Giorello; Richard Corben	José Villarrubia	Frank Cho
#4	October 15, 2008	The Skrae	Timothy Truman	Tomás Giorello; Richard Corben	José Villarrubia	Frank Cho
#5	November 19, 2008	The Wolf's Promise	Timothy Truman	Tomás Giorello; Richard Corben	José Villarrubia	Frank Cho
#6	December 17, 2008	Homecoming	Timothy Truman	Tomás Giorello; Richard Corben	José Villarrubia	Frank Cho
#7	January 21, 2009	Darkness and the Night	Timothy Truman	Tomás Giorello; Richard Corben	José Villarrubia	Frank Cho
#8	February 25, 2009	The Scorpion	Timothy Truman, adapting Robert E. Howard's "Black Colossus"	Tomás Giorello	José Villarrubia	Joseph Michael Linsner
#9	March 25, 2009	The Mercenary	Timothy Truman, adapting Robert E. Howard's "Black Colossus"	Tomás Giorello	José Villarrubia	Joseph Michael Linsner
#10	April 29, 2009	The Commander	Timothy Truman, adapting Robert E. Howard's "Black Colossus"	Tomás Giorello	José Villarrubia	Joseph Michael Linsner
#11	June 3, 2009	The Face on the Coin	Timothy Truman, adapting Robert E. Howard's "Black Colossus"	Tomás Giorello	José Villarrubia	Joseph Michael Linsner
#12	July 22, 2009	The Battle of Shamla Pass	Timothy Truman, adapting Robert E. Howard's "Black Colossus"	Tomás Giorello	José Villarrubia	Joseph Michael Linsner
#13	August 19, 2009	Black Altar	Timothy Truman, adapting Robert E. Howard's "Black Colossus"	Tomás Giorello	José Villarrubia	Joseph Michael Linsner
#14	September 23, 2009	Home For the Hunt	Timothy Truman	Joe Kubert; Timothy Truman	José Villarrubia	Joseph Michael Linsner
#15	November 4, 2009	The Sorrow of Akivasha	Timothy Truman	Paul Lee		Joseph Michael Linsner
#16	November 18, 2009	Free Companions	Timothy Truman	Tomás Giorello	José Villarrubia	Joseph Michael Linsner
#17	January 6, 2010	Free Companions	Timothy Truman	Tomás Giorello	José Villarrubia	Joseph Michael Linsner
#18	February 3, 2010	Free Companions	Timothy Truman	Tomás Giorello	José Villarrubia	Joseph Michael Linsner
#19	March 3, 2010	Kozaki	Timothy Truman	Tomás Giorello	José Villarrubia	Joseph Michael Linsner
#20	April 28, 2010	Kozaki	Timothy Truman	Tomás Giorello	José Villarrubia	Cary Nord; Dave Stewart
#21	June 2, 2010	Kozaki	Timothy Truman	Tomás Giorello	José Villarrubia	Cary Nord; Dave Stewart
#22	July 7, 2010	Iron Shadows in the Moon	Timothy Truman, adapting Robert E. Howard's "Shadows in the Moonlight"	Tomás Giorello; Paul Lee	José Villarrubia	Cary Nord; Dave Stewart
#23	August 25, 2010	Iron Shadows in the Moon	Timothy Truman, adapting Robert E. Howard's "Shadows in the Moonlight"	Tomás Giorello	José Villarrubia	Tomás Giorello
#24	October 20, 2010	Iron Shadows in the Moon	Timothy Truman, adapting Robert E. Howard's "Shadows in the Moonlight"	Tomás Giorello	José Villarrubia	Tomás Giorello
#25	November 24, 2010	Iron Shadows in the Moon	Timothy Truman, adapting Robert E. Howard's "Shadows in the Moonlight"	Tomás Giorello	José Villarrubia	Original Cover by Tomás Giorello, Variant Cover by Geof Darrow

=== Conan: Road of Kings ===
Conan: Road of Kings was Dark Horse Comics' third series about Conan. It featured Roy Thomas as the writer and Mike Hawthorne as the primary artist on the series.

Issue	Date	Title	Story	Art	Color	Cover
#1	December 15, 2010	Untitled	Roy Thomas	Mike Hawthorne	Dave Stewart	Original cover by Doug Wheatley, Variant cover by Dale Keown
#2	January 26, 2011	Shadizar the Wicked	Roy Thomas	Mike Hawthorne	Dave Stewart	Doug Wheatley
#3	March 2, 2011	Untitled	Roy Thomas	Mike Hawthorne	Dave Stewart	Doug Wheatley
#4	April 27, 2011	Untitled	Roy Thomas	Mike Hawthorne	Dan Jackson	Doug Wheatley
#5	May 25, 2011	Untitled	Roy Thomas	Mike Hawthorne	Dan Jackson	Doug Wheatley
#6	June 22, 2011	Untitled	Roy Thomas	Mike Hawthorne	Dan Jackson	Doug Wheatley
#7	August 17, 2011	Of Princes and Plotters	Roy Thomas	Mike Hawthorne	Dan Jackson	Aleksi Briclot
#8	September 21, 2011	The Horrors Beneath the Stones	Roy Thomas	Mike Hawthorne	Dan Jackson	Aleksi Briclot
#9	October 19, 2011	When Death Takes Wing...	Roy Thomas	Dan Panosian	Dan Jackson	Aleksi Briclot
#10	November 16, 2011	Is Tarantia Burning?	Roy Thomas	Dan Panosian	Dan Jackson	Aleksi Briclot
#11	December 21, 2011	A Cimmerian in Argos	Roy Thomas	Mike Hawthorne	Dan Jackson	Aleksi Briclot
#12	January 18, 2012	Conan's Day in Court	Roy Thomas	Mike Hawthorne	Dan Jackson	Aleksi Briclot

=== Conan the Barbarian ===
Conan the Barbarian was Dark Horse Comics' fourth series about Conan. Brian Wood's run on the series was twenty-five issues and expanded on Robert E. Howard's original story "Queen of the Black Coast".

Issue	Date	Title	Story	Art	Color	Cover
#1	February 8, 2012	Queen of the Black Coast	Brian Wood, adapting Robert E. Howard's "Queen of the Black Coast", chapter 1	Becky Cloonan	Dave Stewart	Original cover by Massimo Carnevale, Variant cover by Becky Cloonan
#2	March 14, 2012	Queen of the Black Coast	Brian Wood, adapting Robert E. Howard's "Queen of the Black Coast", chapter 1	Becky Cloonan	Dave Stewart	Original cover by Massimo Carnevale, Variant cover by Leandro Fernandez with Dave Stewart
#3	April 11, 2012	Queen of the Black Coast	Brian Wood, adapting Robert E. Howard's "Queen of the Black Coast", chapter 1	Becky Cloonan	Dave Stewart	Original cover by Massimo Carnevale, Variant cover by John Paul Leon with Dave Stewart
#4	May 16, 2012	The Argos Deception	Brian Wood	James Harren	Dave Stewart	Massimo Carnevale
#5	June 13, 2012	The Argos Deception	Brian Wood	James Harren	Dave Stewart	Massimo Carnevale
#6	July 11, 2012	The Argos Deception	Brian Wood	James Harren	Dave Stewart	Massimo Carnevale
#7	August 8, 2012	Border Fury	Brian Wood	Becky Cloonan	Dave Stewart	Massimo Carnevale
#8	September 12, 2012	Border Fury	Brian Wood	Vasilis Lolos	Dave Stewart	Massimo Carnevale
#9	October 10, 2012	Border Fury	Brian Wood	Vasilis Lolos	Dave Stewart	Massimo Carnevale
#10	November 14, 2012	The Death	Brian Wood	Declan Shalvey	Dave Stewart	Massimo Carnevale
#11	December 12, 2012	The Death	Brian Wood	Declan Shalvey	Dave Stewart	Massimo Carnevale
#12	January 16, 2013	The Death	Brian Wood	Declan Shalvey	Dave Stewart	Massimo Carnevale
#13	February 20, 2013	The Woman on the Wall	Brian Wood	Mirko Colak	Dave Stewart	Massimo Carnevale
#14	March 20, 2013	The Woman on the Wall	Brian Wood	Mirko Colak	Dave Stewart	Massimo Carnevale
#15	April 17, 2013	The Woman on the Wall	Brian Wood	Andrea Mutti	Dave Stewart	Massimo Carnevale
#16	May 15, 2013	The Nightmare of the Shallows	Brian Wood	Davide Gianfelice	Dave Stewart	Massimo Carnevale
#17	June 19, 2013	The Nightmare of the Shallows	Brian Wood	Davide Gianfelice	Dave Stewart	Massimo Carnevale
#18	July 17, 2013	The Nightmare of the Shallows	Brian Wood	Davide Gianfelice	Dave Stewart	Massimo Carnevale
#19	August 21, 2013	Black Stones	Brian Wood	Paul Azaceta	Dave Stewart	Massimo Carnevale
#20	September 18, 2013	Black Stones	Brian Wood	Paul Azaceta	Dave Stewart	Massimo Carnevale
#21	October 16, 2013	Black Stones	Brian Wood	Paul Azaceta	Dave Stewart	Massimo Carnevale
#22	November 20, 2013	The Song of Bêlit	Brian Wood, adapting Robert E. Howard's "Queen of the Black Coast", chapters 2–5	Riccardo Burchielli	Dave Stewart	Massimo Carnevale
#23	December 18, 2013	The Song of Bêlit	Brian Wood, adapting Robert E. Howard's "Queen of the Black Coast", chapters 2–5	Riccardo Burchielli	Dave Stewart	Massimo Carnevale
#24	January 22, 2014	The Song of Bêlit	Brian Wood, adapting Robert E. Howard's "Queen of the Black Coast", chapters 2–5	Riccardo Burchielli	Dave Stewart	Massimo Carnevale
#25	February 19, 2014	The Song of Bêlit	Brian Wood, adapting Robert E. Howard's "Queen of the Black Coast", chapters 2–5	Riccardo Burchielli	Dave Stewart	Massimo Carnevale

=== Conan the Avenger ===
Conan the Avenger was Dark Horse Comics' fifth series about Conan, with Fred Van Lente as the writer.

Issue	Date	Title	Story	Art	Color	Cover
#1	April 23, 2014	Shadows Over Kush	Fred Van Lente, adapting Robert E. Howard's "The Snout in the Dark"	Brian Ching	Michael Atiyeh	Iain McCaig
#2	May 28, 2014	Shadows Over Kush	Fred Van Lente, adapting Robert E. Howard's "The Snout in the Dark"	Brian Ching	Michael Atiyeh	Kilian Plunkett
#3	June 25, 2014	Shadows Over Kush	Fred Van Lente, adapting Robert E. Howard's "The Snout in the Dark"	Brian Ching	Michael Atiyeh	Philip Tan and Romulo Fajardo Jr.
#4	July 23, 2014	Shadows Over Kush	Fred Van Lente, adapting Robert E. Howard's "The Snout in the Dark"	Eduardo Francisco	Michael Atiyeh	Fiona Staples
#5	August 27, 2014	Shadows Over Kush	Fred Van Lente, adapting Robert E. Howard's "The Snout in the Dark"	Eduardo Francisco	Michael Atiyeh	Dan Scott
#6	September 24, 2014	Shadows Over Kush	Fred Van Lente, adapting Robert E. Howard's "The Snout in the Dark"	Eduardo Francisco	Michael Atiyeh	Daryl Mandryk
#7	October 29, 2014	The Damned Horde	Fred Van Lente	Brian Ching	Michael Atiyeh	Daryl Mandryk
#8	November 26, 2014	The Damned Horde	Fred Van Lente	Brian Ching	Michael Atiyeh	John Picacio
#9	December 24, 2014	The Damned Horde	Fred Van Lente	Brian Ching	Michael Atiyeh	Steve Ellis
#10	January 28, 2015	The Damned Horde	Fred Van Lente	Brian Ching	Michael Atiyeh	Anthony Palumbo
#11	February 25, 2015	The Damned Horde	Fred Van Lente	Brian Ching	Michael Atiyeh	Jason Felix
#12	March 25, 2015	The Damned Horde	Fred Van Lente	Brian Ching	Michael Atiyeh	Dan Scott
#13	April 29, 2015	Xuthal of the Dusk	Fred Van Lente, adapting Robert E. Howard's "The Slithering Shadow"	Guiu Vilanova	Michael Atiyeh	Eric Powell
#14	May 27, 2015	Xuthal of the Dusk	Fred Van Lente, adapting Robert E. Howard's "The Slithering Shadow"	Guiu Vilanova	Michael Atiyeh	Eric Powell
#15	June 24, 2015	Xuthal of the Dusk	Fred Van Lente, adapting Robert E. Howard's "The Slithering Shadow"	Guiu Vilanova	Michael Atiyeh	Eric Powell
#16	July 29, 2015	Blood Oasis	Fred Van Lente	Brian Ching	Michael Atiyeh	Jason Felix
#17	August 26, 2015	Blood Oasis	Fred Van Lente	Brian Ching	Michael Atiyeh	Jason Felix
#18	September 30, 2015	Blood Oasis	Fred Van Lente	Brian Ching	Michael Atiyeh	Jason Felix
#19	October 28, 2015	Blood Oasis	Fred Van Lente	Brian Ching	Michael Atiyeh	Jason Felix
#20	November 25, 2015	A Witch Shall Be Born	Fred Van Lente, adapting Robert E. Howard's "A Witch Shall Be Born"	Brian Ching	Michael Atiyeh	Paul Renaud
#21	December 30, 2015	A Witch Shall Be Born	Fred Van Lente, adapting Robert E. Howard's "A Witch Shall Be Born"	Jose Luis; Andy Owens	Michael Atiyeh	Paul Renaud
#22	January 27, 2016	A Witch Shall Be Born	Fred Van Lente, adapting Robert E. Howard's "A Witch Shall Be Born"	Brian Ching	Michael Atiyeh	Paul Renaud
#23	February 24, 2016	A Witch Shall Be Born	Fred Van Lente, adapting Robert E. Howard's "A Witch Shall Be Born"	Brian Ching	Michael Atiyeh	Paul Renaud
#24	March 30, 2016	A Witch Shall Be Born	Fred Van Lente, adapting Robert E. Howard's "A Witch Shall Be Born"	Brian Ching	Michael Atiyeh	Paul Renaud
#25	April 27, 2016	A Witch Shall Be Born	Fred Van Lente, adapting Robert E. Howard's "A Witch Shall Be Born"	Brian Ching	Michael Atiyeh	Simon Bisley

=== Conan the Slayer ===
Conan the Slayer was Dark Horse Comics' sixth and final series about Conan, with Cullen Bunn as the writer. Subsequently, the publishing rights reverted to Marvel in 2018.

Issue	Date	Title	Story	Art	Color	Cover
#1	July 13, 2016	Blood in His Wake	Cullen Bunn	Sergio Davila	Michael Atiyeh; Dave Stewart	Lee Bermejo
#2	August 24, 2016	Blood in His Wake	Cullen Bunn	Sergio Davila	Michael Atiyeh	Sergio Davila
#3	September 28, 2016	Blood in His Wake	Cullen Bunn	Sergio Davila	Michael Atiyeh	Admira Wijaya
#4	October 26, 2016	Blood in His Wake	Cullen Bunn	Sergio Davila	Michael Atiyeh	Admira Wijaya
#5	November 30, 2016	Blood in His Wake	Cullen Bunn	Sergio Davila	Michael Atiyeh	Admira Wijaya
#6	January 25, 2017	Blood in His Wake	Cullen Bunn	Sergio Davila	Michael Atiyeh	Admira Wijaya
#7	March 29, 2017	The Devil in Iron	Cullen Bunn, adapting Robert E. Howard's "The Devil in Iron"	Sergio Davila	Michael Atiyeh	Admira Wijaya
#8	April 26, 2017	The Devil in Iron	Cullen Bunn, adapting Robert E. Howard's "The Devil in Iron"	Sergio Davila	Michael Atiyeh	Admira Wijaya
#9	May 24, 2017	The Devil in Iron	Cullen Bunn, adapting Robert E. Howard's "The Devil in Iron"	Sergio Davila	Michael Atiyeh	Phroilan Gardner
#10	June 14, 2017	The Devil in Iron	Cullen Bunn, adapting Robert E. Howard's "The Devil in Iron"	Sergio Davila	Michael Atiyeh	Phroilan Gardner
#11	July 12, 2017	The Devil in Iron	Cullen Bunn, adapting Robert E. Howard's "The Devil in Iron"	Sergio Davila	Michael Atiyeh	Thomas Grindberg
#12	August 23, 2017	The Devil in Iron	Cullen Bunn, adapting Robert E. Howard's "The Devil in Iron"	Dheeraj Verma	Michael Atiyeh	Phroilan Gardner

== Conan (mini-series and one-shots) ==
In addition to the larger series, there are also several miniseries and one shots.

Title	Date	Story	Art	Color	Cover
Conan: and the Daughters of Midora	October 6, 2004	Jimmy Palmiotti	Mark Texeira		
Conan and the Jewels of Gwahlur	#1 April 13, 2005	P. Craig Russell, adapting Robert E. Howard's "The Jewels of Gwahlur"	P. Craig Russell	Lovern Kindzierski	P. Craig Russell
Conan and the Jewels of Gwahlur	#2 May 11, 2005	P. Craig Russell, adapting Robert E. Howard's "The Jewels of Gwahlur"	P. Craig Russell	Lovern Kindzierski	P. Craig Russell
Conan and the Jewels of Gwahlur	#3 June 15, 2005	P. Craig Russell, adapting Robert E. Howard's "The Jewels of Gwahlur"	P. Craig Russell	Lovern Kindzierski	P. Craig Russell
Conan and the Demons of Khitai	#1 October 5, 2005	Akira Yoshida	Paul Lee		Pat Lee
Conan and the Demons of Khitai	#2 November 2, 2005	Akira Yoshida	Paul Lee		Pat Lee
Conan and the Demons of Khitai	#3 December 7, 2005	Akira Yoshida	Paul Lee		Pat Lee
Conan and the Demons of Khitai	#4 January 25, 2006	Akira Yoshida	Paul Lee		Pat Lee
Conan: Book of Thoth	#1 March 15, 2006	Kurt Busiek & Len Wein	Kelley Jones	Michelle Madsen	Kelley Jones
Conan: Book of Thoth	#2 April 19, 2006	Kurt Busiek & Len Wein	Kelley Jones	Michelle Madsen	Kelley Jones
Conan: Book of Thoth	#3 May 24, 2006	Kurt Busiek & Len Wein	Kelley Jones	Michelle Madsen	Kelley Jones
Conan: Book of Thoth	#4 June 21, 2006	Kurt Busiek & Len Wein	Kelley Jones	Michelle Madsen	Kelley Jones
Star Wars/Conan FCBD 2006 "Conan: The Spear"	May 6, 2006	Timothy Truman	Paul Lee	Dave Stewart	Paul Lee
Conan and the Songs of the Dead	#1 July 5, 2006	Joe R. Lansdale	Timothy Truman	Dave Stewart	Timothy Truman
Conan and the Songs of the Dead	#2 August 9, 2006	Joe R. Lansdale	Timothy Truman	Dave Stewart	Timothy Truman
Conan and the Songs of the Dead	#3 September 20, 2006	Joe R. Lansdale	Timothy Truman	Dave Stewart	Timothy Truman
Conan and the Songs of the Dead	#4 October 18, 2006	Joe R. Lansdale	Timothy Truman	Dave Stewart	Timothy Truman
Conan and the Songs of the Dead	#5 November 29, 2006	Joe R. Lansdale	Timothy Truman	Dave Stewart	Timothy Truman
Conan Funcom Special "Age of Conan: Hyborian Adventures"	July 2006	The Age of Conan; Joshua Dysart	The Age of Conan; Tone Rodriguez (pencils); Sean P. Parsons (inks)	The Age of Conan; Michelle Madsen	Cary Nord
Conan Funcom Special "Age of Conan: Hyborian Adventures"	July 2006	The Road of Kings; Timothy Truman	The Road of Kings; Cary Nord	The Road of Kings; Dave Stewart	Cary Nord
Conan and the Midnight God	#1 January 17, 2007	Joshua Dysart	Will Conrad	Juan Ferreyra	Jason Shawn Alexander
Conan and the Midnight God	#2 February 28, 2007	Joshua Dysart	Will Conrad	Juan Ferreyra	Jason Shawn Alexander
Conan and the Midnight God	#3 April 4, 2007	Joshua Dysart	Will Conrad	Juan Ferreyra	Jason Shawn Alexander
Conan and the Midnight God	#4 June 6, 2007	Joshua Dysart	Will Conrad	Juan Ferreyra	Jason Shawn Alexander
Conan and the Midnight God	#5 July 25, 2007	Joshua Dysart	Will Conrad	Juan Ferreyra	Jason Shawn Alexander
MySpace Dark Horse Presents #11 "Conan: Trophy"	June 2008	Benjamin Truman & Timothy Truman	Marian Churchland		N/A
MySpace Dark Horse Presents #28–29 "Conan and the Mad King of Gaul"	Part 1 November 2009	Darick Robertson		Tony Avina	N/A
MySpace Dark Horse Presents #28–29 "Conan and the Mad King of Gaul"	Part 2 December 2009	Darick Robertson		Tony Avina	N/A
Conan: The Weight of the Crown	January 13, 2010	Darick Robertson		Tony Avina	Darick Robertson
USA Today "Conan: Kiss of the Undead"	November 23, 2010	Ron Marz	Bart Sears (pencils); Randy Elliot (inks)	Mark Roberts	N/A
Conan: Island of No Return	#1 June 15, 2011	Ron Marz	Bart Sears (pencils); Randy Elliot (inks)	Mark Roberts	Michael Kutsche
Conan: Island of No Return	#2 July 20, 2011	Ron Marz	Bart Sears (pencils); Randy Elliot (inks)	Mark Roberts	Michael Kutsche
Conan: The Phantoms of the Black Coast	5 issues from October 2012	Victor Gischler	Attila Futaki	Jok	Attila Futaki
Conan and the People of the Black Circle	#1 October 23, 2013	Fred Van Lente, adapting Robert E. Howard's "The People of the Black Circle"	Ariel Olivetti		
Conan and the People of the Black Circle	#2 November 27, 2013	Fred Van Lente, adapting Robert E. Howard's "The People of the Black Circle"	Ariel Olivetti		
Conan and the People of the Black Circle	#3 December 11, 2013	Fred Van Lente, adapting Robert E. Howard's "The People of the Black Circle"	Ariel Olivetti		
Conan and the People of the Black Circle	#4 January 29, 2014	Fred Van Lente, adapting Robert E. Howard's "The People of the Black Circle"	Ariel Olivetti		
Conan/Red Sonja	#1 January 14, 2015	Gail Simone, Jim Zub	Dan Panosian	Dave Stewart	Dan Panosian
Conan/Red Sonja	#2 February 11, 2015	Gail Simone, Jim Zub	Dan Panosian	Dave Stewart	Dan Panosian
Conan/Red Sonja	#3 March 25, 2015	Gail Simone, Jim Zub	Randy Green, Rick Ketcham	Dave Stewart	Dan Panosian
Conan/Red Sonja	#4 April 29, 2015	Gail Simone, Jim Zub	Randy Green, Rick Ketcham	Dave Stewart	Dan Panosian
Red Sonja/Conan	#1 August 5, 2015	Victor Gischler	Roberto Castro	Alex Guimaraes	Alex Ross, Ed Benes, Roberto Castro
Red Sonja/Conan	#2 September 9, 2015	Victor Gischler	Roberto Castro	Alex Guimaraes	Ed Benes
Red Sonja/Conan	#3 October 14, 2015	Victor Gischler	Roberto Castro	Alex Guimaraes	Ed Benes
Red Sonja/Conan	#4 November 11, 2015	Victor Gischler	Roberto Castro	Alex Guimaraes	Ed Benes, Roberto Castro
Wonder Woman/Conan	#1 September 20, 2017	Gail Simone	Aaron Lopresti, Matt Ryan	N/A	Darick Robertson
Wonder Woman/Conan	#2 October 18, 2017	Gail Simone	Aaron Lopresti, Matt Ryan	N/A	Darick Robertson
Wonder Woman/Conan	#3 November 15, 2017	Gail Simone	Aaron Lopresti, Matt Ryan	N/A	Darick Robertson
Wonder Woman/Conan	#4 December 20, 2017	Gail Simone	Aaron Lopresti, Matt Ryan	N/A	Darick Robertson
Wonder Woman/Conan	#5 January 17, 2018	Gail Simone	Aaron Lopresti, Matt Ryan	N/A	Darick Robertson
Wonder Woman/Conan	#6 February 21, 2018	Gail Simone	Aaron Lopresti, Matt Ryan	N/A	Darick Robertson

Conan: The Phantoms of the Black Coast was originally published as an ePlate exclusive miniseries. The back-ups in these issues were reprinted from Robert E. Howard's Savage Sword, and were later collected in the trade paperbacks for that series.

== King Conan (series of mini-series) ==
King Conan was a miniseries about Conan during his time as king of Aquilonia.

Issue	Date	Title	Story	Art	Color	Cover
#1	February 23, 2011	The Scarlet Citadel	Timothy Truman, adapting Robert E. Howard's "The Scarlet Citadel"	Tomás Giorello	José Villarrubia	Gerald Parel
#2	March 30, 2011	The Scarlet Citadel	Timothy Truman, adapting Robert E. Howard's "The Scarlet Citadel"	Tomás Giorello	José Villarrubia	Darick Robertson
#3	April 27, 2011	The Scarlet Citadel	Timothy Truman, adapting Robert E. Howard's "The Scarlet Citadel"	Tomás Giorello	José Villarrubia	Darick Robertson
#4	May 25, 2011	The Scarlet Citadel	Timothy Truman, adapting Robert E. Howard's "The Scarlet Citadel"	Tomás Giorello	José Villarrubia	Darick Robertson
#5	January 25, 2012	The Phoenix on the Sword	Timothy Truman, adapting Robert E. Howard's "The Phoenix on the Sword"	Tomás Giorello	José Villarrubia	Andrew Robinson
#6	February 29, 2012	The Phoenix on the Sword	Timothy Truman, adapting Robert E. Howard's "The Phoenix on the Sword"	Tomás Giorello	José Villarrubia	Andrew Robinson
#7	March 28, 2012	The Phoenix on the Sword	Timothy Truman, adapting Robert E. Howard's "The Phoenix on the Sword"	Tomás Giorello	José Villarrubia	Andrew Robinson
#8	April 25, 2012	The Phoenix on the Sword	Timothy Truman, adapting Robert E. Howard's "The Phoenix on the Sword"	Tomás Giorello	José Villarrubia	Andrew Robinson
#9	May 29, 2013	Hour of the Dragon	Timothy Truman, adapting Robert E. Howard's "The Hour of the Dragon"	Tomás Giorello	José Villarrubia	Sanjulian
#10	June 26, 2013	Hour of the Dragon	Timothy Truman, adapting Robert E. Howard's "The Hour of the Dragon"	Tomás Giorello	José Villarrubia	Gerald Parel
#11	July 31, 2013	Hour of the Dragon	Timothy Truman, adapting Robert E. Howard's "The Hour of the Dragon"	Tomás Giorello	José Villarrubia	Gerald Parel
#12	August 28, 2013	Hour of the Dragon	Timothy Truman, adapting Robert E. Howard's "The Hour of the Dragon"	Tomás Giorello	José Villarrubia	Gerald Parel
#13	September 25, 2013	Hour of the Dragon	Timothy Truman, adapting Robert E. Howard's "The Hour of the Dragon"	Tomás Giorello	José Villarrubia	Gerald Parel
#14	October 30, 2013	Hour of the Dragon	Timothy Truman, adapting Robert E. Howard's "The Hour of the Dragon"	Tomás Giorello	José Villarrubia	Gerald Parel
#15	February 26, 2014	The Conqueror	Timothy Truman, adapting Robert E. Howard's "The Hour of the Dragon"	Tomás Giorello	José Villarrubia	Tomás Giorello
#16	March 26, 2014	The Conqueror	Timothy Truman, adapting Robert E. Howard's "The Hour of the Dragon"	Tomás Giorello	José Villarrubia	Tomás Giorello
#17	April 30, 2014	The Conqueror	Timothy Truman, adapting Robert E. Howard's "The Hour of the Dragon"	Tomás Giorello	José Villarrubia	Tomás Giorello
#18	May 28, 2014	The Conqueror	Timothy Truman, adapting Robert E. Howard's "The Hour of the Dragon"	Tomás Giorello	José Villarrubia	Tomás Giorello
#19	June 25, 2014	The Conqueror	Timothy Truman, adapting Robert E. Howard's "The Hour of the Dragon"	Tomás Giorello	José Villarrubia	Tomás Giorello
#20	July 30, 2014	The Conqueror	Timothy Truman, adapting Robert E. Howard's "The Hour of the Dragon"	Tomás Giorello	José Villarrubia	Tomás Giorello
#21	December 23, 2015	Wolves Beyond the Border	Timothy Truman, adapting Robert E. Howard's "Wolves Beyond the Border"	Tomás Giorello	José Villarrubia	Tomas Giorello
#22	January 27, 2016	Wolves Beyond the Border	Timothy Truman, adapting Robert E. Howard's "Wolves Beyond the Border"	Tomás Giorello	José Villarrubia	Tomas Giorello
#23	February 24, 2016	Wolves Beyond the Border	Timothy Truman, adapting Robert E. Howard's "Wolves Beyond the Border"	Tomás Giorello	José Villarrubia	Tomas Giorello
#24	March 30, 2016	Wolves Beyond the Border	Timothy Truman, adapting Robert E. Howard's "Wolves Beyond the Border"	Tomás Giorello	José Villarrubia	Tomas Giorello

== Collections ==
=== Conan ===
Volume	Series	Title	Collects	Cover	Published	ISBN
0	Conan	Born on the Battlefield	Conan #8; Conan #15; Conan #23; Conan #32; Conan #45–46	Greg Ruth	May 21, 2008 (HC); June 18, 2008 (TPB)	978-1-59307-980-2 (HC); 978-1-59307-981-9 (TPB)
1	Conan	The Frost-Giant's Daughter and other stories	Conan #0–6; Conan #7 (first 14 pages)	Cary Nord	March 30, 2005 (HC); March 30, 2005 (TPB)	978-1-59307-324-4 (HC); 978-1-59307-301-5 (TPB)
2	Conan	The God in the Bowl and other stories	Conan #7 (last 8 pages); Conan #9–14	Cary Nord	September 28, 2005 (HC); October 5, 2005 (TPB)	978-1-59307-440-1 (HC); 978-1-59307-403-6 (TPB)
3	Conan	The Tower of the Elephant and other stories	Conan #0; Conan #16–17; Conan #19–22	Cary Nord	May 17, 2006 (HC); June 21, 2006 (TPB)	978-1-59307-576-7 (HC); 978-1-59307-547-7 (TPB)
4	Conan	The Hall of the Dead and other stories	Conan #24–25; Conan #29–31; Conan #33–34	Cary Nord	May 30, 2007 (HC); June 13, 2007 (TPB)	978-1-59307-796-9 (HC); 978-1-59307-775-4 (TPB)
5	Conan	Rogues in the House and other stories	Conan #37–38; Conan #41–44	Cary Nord	March 26, 2008 (HC); March 26, 2008 (TPB)	978-1-59307-941-3 (HC); 978-1-59307-903-1 (TPB)
6	Conan	The Hand of Nergal	Conan #47–50	Tomàs Giorello	September 17, 2008 (HC); September 17, 2008 (TPB)	978-1-59582-179-9 (HC); 978-1-59582-178-2 (TPB)
7	Conan the Cimmerian	Cimmeria	Conan the Cimmerian #0–7	Tomàs Giorello	May 27, 2009 (HC); May 20, 2009 (TPB)	978-1-59582-341-0 (HC); 978-1-59582-283-3 (TPB)
8	Conan the Cimmerian	Black Colossus	Conan the Cimmerian #8–13	Tomàs Giorello	April 28, 2010 (HC); June 2, 2010 (TPB)	978-1-59582-507-0 (HC); 978-1-59582-533-9 (TPB)
9	Conan the Cimmerian	Free Companions	Conan the Cimmerian #14; Conan the Cimmerian #16–21	Tomàs Giorello	November 10, 2010 (HC); March 9, 2011 (TPB)	978-1-59582-623-7 (HC); 978-1-59582-592-6 (TPB)
10	Conan the Cimmerian	Iron Shadows in the Moon and other stories	Conan the Cimmerian #22–25; Conan and the Mad King of Gaul; Conan: Weight of the Crown	Cary Nord	April 6, 2011 (HC); May 4, 2011 (TPB)	978-1-59582-712-8 (HC); 978-1-59582-713-5 (TPB)
11	Conan: Road of Kings	Road of Kings	Conan: Road of Kings #1–6	Doug Wheatley	February 1, 2012 (HC); June 27, 2012 (TPB)	978-1-59582-817-0 (HC); 978-1-59582-824-8 (TPB)
12	Conan: Road of Kings	Throne of Aquilonia	Conan: Road of Kings #7–12	Aleksi Briclot	July 25, 2012 (HC); January 16, 2013 (TPB)	978-1-59582-904-7 (HC); 978-1-59582-905-4 (TPB)
13	Conan the Barbarian	Queen of the Black Coast	Conan the Barbarian #1–6	Massimo Carnevale	January 9, 2013 (HC); June 19, 2013 (TPB)	978-1-61655-042-4 (HC); 978-1-61655-043-1 (TPB)
14	Conan the Barbarian	The Death	Conan the Barbarian #7–12	Massimo Carnevale	July 17, 2013 (HC); December 18, 2013 (TPB)	978-1-61655-122-3 (HC); 978-1-61655-123-0 (TPB)
15	Conan the Barbarian	The Nightmare of the Shallows	Conan the Barbarian #13–18	Massimo Carnevale	January 22, 2014 (HC); July 16, 2014 (TPB)	978-1-61655-233-6 (HC); 978-1-61655-385-2 (TPB)
16	Conan the Barbarian	The Song of Bêlit	Conan the Barbarian #19–25	Massimo Carnevale	September 2, 2014 (HC); February 17, 2015 (TPB)	978-1-61655-430-9 (HC); 978-1-61655-524-5 (TPB)
17	Conan the Avenger	Shadows Over Kush	Conan the Avenger #1–6	Daryl Mandryk	March 4, 2015 (HC); August 18, 2015 (TPB)	978-1-61655-522-1 (HC); 978-1-61655-659-4 (TPB)
18	Conan the Avenger	The Damned Horde	Conan the Avenger #7–12	Dan Scott	February 16, 2016 (TPB)	978-1-61655-799-7 (TPB)
19	Conan the Avenger	Xuthal of the Dusk	Conan the Avenger #13–19	Eric Powell	March 15, 2016 (HC); August 16, 2016 (TPB)	978-1-61655-878-9 (HC); 978-1-61655-879-6 (TPB)
20	Conan the Avenger	A Witch Shall Be Born	Conan the Avenger #20–25	Michael Atiyeh	January 11, 2017 (TPB)	978-1-5067-0134-9 (TPB)
21	Conan the Slayer	Blood in His Wake	Conan the Slayer #1–6	Lee Bermejo	April 26, 2017 (TPB)	978-1-5067-0133-2 (TPB)
22	Conan the Slayer	The Devil In Iron	Conan the Slayer #7–12	Admira Wijaya	November 30, 2017 (TPB)	978-1-5067-0173-8 (TPB)

Conan super-sized collections

Title	Collects	Cover	Published	Details	ISBN
The Colossal Conan	Conan #0–50	Mark Schultz	November 13, 2013	Introduction by Kurt Busiek; Afterword by Timothy Truman; 1,264 pages	978-1-61655-228-2 (HC)
The Colossal Conan the Cimmerian	Conan the Cimmerian #0–25		October 30, 2018	Original Howard works that are adapted "Cimmeria," "Black Colossus," and "Iron Shadows in the Moon."; Guest artists include Joe Kubert, Richard Corben, and Paul Lee!; 680 pages	978-1-5067-1046-4
The Colossal King Conan	King Conan #1–24		November 27, 2018	624 pages; Includes twelve-issue adaptation of novel "The Hour of the Dragon"	978-1-5067-1047-1
The Conan Reader	Conan and the Jewels of Gwahlur #1–3; Conan: Book of Thoth #1–4; Conan and the People of the Black Circle #1–4; Conan and the Songs of the Dead #1–5; Conan: The Blood-Stained Crown and Other Stories TPB; Conan: The Daughters of Midora and Other Stories TPB	Tony Harris	December 12, 2018	688 pages	978-1-5067-1108-9

Conan Omnibus TPB

Volume	Series	Title	Collects	Cover	Published	ISBN
1	Conan	Birth of the Legend	Conan #0–15; Conan #23; Conan #32; Conan #45–46	Joseph Michael Linsner	December 7, 2016	978-1-5067-0282-7
2	Conan	City of Thieves	Conan #16–17; Conan #19–22; Conan #24–25; Conan #29–31; Conan #33–34; Conan #37–38; Conan #41–44	Tony Harris	May 24, 2017	978-1-5067-0294-0
3	Conan	Ancient Gods and Sorcerers	Conan #47–50; Conan the Cimmerian #0–13	Frank Cho	August 15, 2017	978-1-5067-0295-7
4	Conan	Mercenaries and Madness	Conan the Cimmerian #14; Conan the Cimmerian #16–25; Conan and the Mad King of Gaul; Conan: Weight of the Crown; Conan: Road of Kings #1–6	Cary Nord	May 9, 2018	978-1-5067-0809-6
5	Conan	Piracy and Passion	Conan: Road of Kings #7–12; Conan the Barbarian #1–12	Massimo Carnevale	July 17, 2018	978-1-5067-0810-2
6	Conan	Savagery and Sorrow	Conan the Barbarian #13–25; Conan the Avenger # 1–6	Massimo Carnevale	September 18, 2018	978-1-5067-1049-5
7	Conan	Witchcraft and Warfare	Conan the Avenger # 7–25	Daryl Mandryk	November 20, 2018	978-1-5067-1050-1

=== Conan (mini-series and one-shots) ===
Some of these collections also collect issues from the Conan line of comics, yet they were not collected as part the chronological collections.

Title	Collects	Cover	Published	ISBN
Conan and the Jewels of Gwahlur	Conan and the Jewels of Gwahlur #1–3	P. Craig Russell	December 28, 2005	978-1-59307-491-3 (HC)
Conan and the Demons of Khitai	Conan and the Demons of Khitai #1–4	Pat Lee	July 12, 2006	978-1-59307-543-9 (TPB)
Conan: Book of Thoth	Conan: Book of Thoth #1–4	Kelley Jones	December 13, 2006	978-1-59307-648-1 (TPB)
Conan and the Songs of the Dead	Conan and the Songs of the Dead #1–5	Timothy Truman	April 11, 2007	978-1-59307-718-1 (TPB)
Conan and the Midnight God	The Age of Conan; Conan and the Midnight God #1–5	Jason Shawn Alexander	November 14, 2007	978-1-59307-852-2 (TPB)
The Blood-Stained Crown and Other Stories	Conan #18; Conan #26–28; Conan #39	Cary Nord	January 30, 2008	978-1-59307-886-7 (TPB)
The Spear and Other Stories	Conan: The Spear; Conan #35–36; Conan #40; Conan the Cimmerian #15	Cary Nord	June 16, 2010	978-1-59582-523-0 (TPB)
The Daughters of Midora and Other Stories	Conan and the Daughters of Midora; Conan: Trophy; Conan: Kiss of the Undead; Conan: Island of No Return #1–2; Children of the Sun (New story by Michael Avon Oeming)	Mark Texeira	August 15, 2012	978-1-59582-917-7 (TPB)
Conan: The Phantoms of the Black Coast	Conan: The Phantoms of the Black Coast #1–5	Attila Futaki	January 29, 2014	978-1-61655-244-2 (TPB)
Conan and the People of the Black Circle	Conan and the People of the Black Circle #1–4	Ariel Olivetti	May 7, 2014	978-1-61655-459-0 (HC)
Conan/Red Sonja	Conan/Red Sonja #1–4	Dan Panosian	August 11, 2015	978-1-61655-651-8 (HC)
Red Sonja/Conan: The Blood of a God	Red Sonja/Conan #1–4	Alex Ross	February 16, 2016	978-1-60690-821-1 (HC)

=== King Conan ===
Volume	Series	Title	Collects	Cover	Published	ISBN
1	King Conan	The Scarlet Citadel	King Conan #1–4	Gerald Parel	February 15, 2012 (TPB)	978-1-59582-838-5 (TPB)
2	King Conan	The Phoenix on the Sword	King Conan #5–8	Andrew Robinson	February 13, 2013 (TPB)	978-1-61655-029-5 (TPB)
3	King Conan	The Hour of the Dragon	King Conan #9–14	Gerald Parel	April 23, 2014 (TPB)	978-1-61655-307-4 (TPB)
4	King Conan	The Conqueror	King Conan #15–20	Tomás Giorello	January 21, 2015 (TPB)	978-1-61655-514-6 (TPB)
5	King Conan	Wolves Beyond the Border	King Conan #21–24	Tomás Giorello	August 9, 2016 (TPB)	978-1-61655-888-8 (TPB)

== Adaptations of Robert E. Howard's original stories ==
An interior panel of Conan #2 (Collected in The Frost-Giant's Daughter and Other Stories) comic adaptation by Kurt Busiek featuring art by Cary Nord and Thomas Yeates. The original short story was written by Robert E. Howard in 1932 and was not published during his brief lifetime.

Conan adapts these stories:

- "The Frost-Giant's Daughter": Issue 2.
- "The God in the Bowl": Issues 10 & 11.
- "The Tower of the Elephant": Issues 20–22.
- "The Hall of the Dead": Issues 29–31.
- "Rogues in the House": Issues 41–44.
- "The Hand of Nergal": Issues 47–50.

Conan the Cimmerian adapts these stories:

- "Black Colossus": Issues 8–13.
- "Shadows in the Moonlight": Issues 22–25.

Conan the Barbarian adapts these stories:

- "Queen of the Black Coast": Issues 1–3 and 22–25.

Conan the Avenger adapts these stories:

- "The Snout in the Dark": Issues 1–6.
- "The Slithering Shadow" ("Xuthal of the Dusk"): Issues 13–15.
- "A Witch Shall be Born": Issues 20–25.

Conan the Slayer adapts these stories:

- "The Devil in Iron": Issues 7–12.

The People of the Black Circle (mini-series) adapts:

- "The People of the Black Circle"

Conan And the Jewels of Gwahlur (mini-series) adapts:

- "Jewels of Gwahlur" ("The Servants of Bit-Yakin")

King Conan adapts these stories:

- "The Scarlet Citadel": Issues 1–4.
- "The Phoenix on the Sword": Issues 5–8.
- "The Hour of the Dragon": Issues 9–20.
- "Wolves Beyond the Border": Issues 21–24.

== Collections of Marvel Comics comics ==
=== The Chronicles of Conan ===
This 34-volume series collects the complete run of Marvel Comics' Conan the Barbarian (unless noted), digitally re-coloured.

By Roy Thomas and Barry Windsor-Smith (unless noted):

- Volume 1: Tower of the Elephant and Other Stories (2003) – collects issues 1–8.
- Volume 2: Rogues In the House and Other Stories (2003) – collects issues 9–13, 16.
- Volume 3: The Monster of the Monoliths and Other Stories (2003) – collects issues 14–15, 17–21 (also by Gil Kane).
- Volume 4: The Song of Red Sonja and Other Stories (2004) – collects issues 23–26 and Red Nails, originally published in Savage Tales 2 & 3.

By Roy Thomas and John Buscema (unless noted):

- Volume 5: The Shadow In the Tomb and Other Stories (2004) – collects issues 27–34.
- Volume 6: The Curse of the Golden Skull and Other Stories (2004) – collects issues 35–42 (also by Neal Adams and Rich Buckler).
- Volume 7: The Dweller In the Pool and Other Stories (2005) – collects issues 43–51.
- Volume 8: Brothers of the Blade and Other Stories (2005) – collects issues 52–59 (also by Mike Ploog).
- Volume 9: Riders of the River-Dragons and Other Stories (2006) – collects issues 60–63, 65, 69–71 (also by Val Mayerik).
- Volume 10: When Giants Walk the Earth and Other Stories (2006) – collects issues 72–77, 79–81 (also by Howard Chaykin).
- Volume 11: The Dance of the Skull and Other Stories (2007) – collects issues 82–86, 88–90 (also by Howard Chaykin).
- Volume 12: The Beast King of Abombi and Other Stories (2007) – collects issues 91, 93–100.
- Volume 13: Whispering Shadows and Other Stories (November 2007) – collects issues 92, 101–107 (also by Sal Buscema).
- Volume 14: Shadow of the Beast and Other Stories (2008) – collects issues 108–115.

By J. M. DeMatteis and John Buscema and Others

- Volume 15: The Corridor of Mullah-Kajar and Other Stories (July 2008) – collects issues 116–121 and Conan Annual #2
- Volume 16: The Eternity War and Other Stories (December 2008) – collects issues 122–126 and Conan Annual #4–5

By J. M. DeMatteis, Bruce Jones, Gil Kane, and Others

- Volume 17: The Creation Quest and Other Stories (February 2009) – collects issues 127–134 and Conan Annual #6.

By Bruce Jones and John Buscema and others

- Volume 18: The Isle of the Dead and Other Stories (September 2009) – collects issues 135–142.
- Volume 19: Deathmark and Other Stories (June 2010) – collects issues 143–150.

By Michael Fleisher and John Buscema and others

- Volume 20: Night of the Wolf and Other Stories (December 2010) – collects issues 151–159.
- Volume 21: Blood of the Titan and Other Stories (August 2011) – collects 160–167 and Conan Annual #7.
- Volume 22: Reavers In the Borderland and Other Stories (July 2012) – collects Conan Annuals #8 and #9, and issues 168–173.

By Jim Owsley and John Buscema and others

- Volume 23: Well of Souls and Other Stories (April 2013) – collects issues 174–181 and Conan Annual #10.
- Volume 24: Blood Dawn and Other Stories (July 2013) – collects issues 182–189 and Conan Annual #11.
- Volume 25: Exodus and Other Stories (November 2013) – collects issues 190–198.
- Volume 26: Legion of the Dead and Other Stories (April 2014) – collects issues 199–205 and Conan Annual #12.
- Volume 27: Sands Upon the Earth and Other Stories (July 2014) – collects issues 206–214 and Handbook of the Conan Universe.

By Charles Santino and Val Semeiks and others

- Volume 28: Blood And Ice and Other Stories (December 2014) – collects issues 215–223.

By Gerry Conway and others

- Volume 29: The Shape In the Shadow and Other Stories (March 2015) – collects issues 224–232.

By Michael Higgins and others

- Volume 30: The Death of Conan and Other Stories (December 2015) – collects issues 233–240.

By Roy Thomas, Gary Hartle, Michael Docherty, and others

- Volume 31: Empire of the Undead and Other Stories (March 2016) – collects issues 241–249.
- Volume 32: The Second Coming of Shuma-Gorath and Other Stories (August 2016) – collects issues 250–258.
- Volume 33: The Mountain Where Crom Dwells and Other Stories (November 2016) – collects issues 259–267.
- Volume 34: Betrayal in Zamora and Other Stories (March 2017) – collects issues 268–275.

=== The Savage Sword of Conan ===
This 22-volume series collects the complete run of Marvel Comics' The Savage Sword of Conan.

Volume	Collects	Story	Art	Published	ISBN
1	#1–10	Roy Thomas	Barry Windsor-Smith; John Buscema; Alfredo Alcala; Pablo Marcos and others	January 2, 2008	ISBN 978-1-59307-838-6
2	#11–24	Roy Thomas	Barry Windsor-Smith; John Buscema	February 27, 2008	ISBN 978-1-59307-894-2
3	#25–36	Roy Thomas	John Buscema; Alfredo Alcala; Jim Starlin; Al Milgrom; Pablo Marcos and others	May 21, 2008	ISBN 978-1-59307-960-4
4	#37–48	Roy Thomas	John Buscema; Sal Buscema; Ernie Colon; Klaus Janson; Gil Kane; Tony DeZuniga and others	October 8, 2008	ISBN 978-1-59582-149-2
5	#49–60	Roy Thomas	John Buscema and others	February 18, 2009	ISBN 978-1-59582-175-1
6	#61–71	Roy Thomas; Michael Fleisher; Bruce Jones	John Buscema and others	August 26, 2009	ISBN 978-1-59582-375-5
7	#72–84	Chris Claremont; Michael Fleisher; Bruce Jones	John Buscema; Ernie Chan; Alfredo Alcala and others	April 28, 2010	ISBN 978-1-59582-510-0
8	#85–93	Michael Fleisher; Alan Zelenetz; Jim Owsley; Jim Neal	Gil Kane; John Buscema; Val Mayerik; Bob Camp and others	September 22, 2010	ISBN 978-1-59582-582-7
9	#94–102	Michael Fleisher	John Buscema; Val Mayerik; Pablo Marcos; Ernie Chan; Vince Colletta; Rudy Nebres	February 2, 2011	ISBN 978-1-59582-648-0
10	#103–111	Michael Fleisher; Don Kraar; Jim Neal; Alan Rowlands; Jim Owsley; Bill Mantlo	Pablo Marcos; Val Mayerik; Ernie Chan; Gary Kwapisz; Bob Camp; William Johnson; Geof Isherwood; Dave Simons; Rudy Nebres; Tony Salmons; Mike Docherty; Tim Burgard	September 7, 2011	ISBN 978-1-59582-799-9
11	#112–120	Larry Yakata; Michael Fleisher; Don Kraar	Pablo Marcos; Val Mayerik; Ernie Chan; Gary Kwapisz; Dave Simons; Rudy Nebres	May 2, 2012	ISBN 978-1-59582-903-0
12	#121–130	Don Kraar; Larry Yakata; Jim Owsley	Mike Docherty; Gary Kwapisz; Ernie Chan; Rudy Nebres; Fraja Bator	November 7, 2012	ISBN 978-1-59582-940-5
13	#131–140	Charles Dixon; Larry Yakata; Don Kraar	Gary Kwapisz; Dave Simons; Andy Kubert; Ernie Chan	April 3, 2013	ISBN 978-1-61655-060-8
14	#141–150	Charles Dixon	Gary Kwapisz; Ernie Chan	August 7, 2013	ISBN 978-1-61655-191-9
15	#151–160	Charles Dixon; Don Kraar	Gary Kwapisz; Ernie Chan; Andy Kubert	December 4, 2013	ISBN 978-1-61655-149-0
16	#161–170	Charles Dixon; Gerry Conway	Gary Kwapisz; Mike Docherty; Jorge Zaffino; Ernie Chan; Andy Kubert	May 21, 2014	ISBN 978-1-61655-367-8
17	#171–180	N/A	N/A	September 17, 2014	ISBN 978-1-61655-368-5
18	#181–190	Charles Dixon; Doug Murray; Larry Yakata	Michael Docherty; Ernie Chan	January 21, 2015	ISBN 978-1-61655-369-2
19	#191–201	Roy Thomas	John Buscema; Ernie Chan; Tony DeZuniga	May 20, 2015	ISBN 978-1-61655-575-7
20	#202–212	Roy Thomas		November 10, 2015	ISBN 978-1-61655-869-7
21	#213–223	Roy Thomas		February 19, 2016	ISBN 978-1-61655-870-3
22	#224–235	Roy Thomas		June 7, 2016	ISBN 978-1-61655-871-0

=== The Chronicles of King Conan ===
This 11-volume series collects the complete run of Marvel Comics' King Conan, with five issues in each volume:

- Volume 1 – The Witch of the Mists and Other Stories Written by Roy Thomas, Art by John Buscema, Ernie Chan and Danny Bulanadi. (ISBN 978-1-59307-477-7)
- Volume 2 – Vengeance From the Desert and Other Stories Written by Roy Thomas and Doug Moench. Art by John Buscema and Ernie Chan. (ISBN 978-1-59582-670-1)
- Volume 3 – The Haunter of the Cenotaph and Other Stories (ISBN 978-1-59582-939-9)
- Volume 4 – The Prince Is Dead and Other Stories (ISBN 978-1-61655-062-2)
- Volume 5 – The Black Dragons and Other Stories (ISBN 978-1-61655-063-9)
- Volume 6 – A Death In Stygia and Other Stories (ISBN 978-1-61655-195-7)
- Volume 7 – Day of Wrath and Other Stories (ISBN 978-1-61655-347-0)
- Volume 8 – The Road To Empire and Other Stories (ISBN 978-1-61655-370-8)
- Volume 9 – The Blood of the Serpent and Other Stories (ISBN 978-1-61655-371-5)
- Volume 10 – The Warlord of Koth and Other Stories (ISBN 978-1-61655-372-2)
- Volume 11 – Nightmare and Other Stories (ISBN 978-1-61655-576-4)

== Other Conan publications by Dark Horse ==
- Conan the Barbarian – The Mask of Acheron (2011 movie adaptation) Written by Stuart Moore. Art by Gabriel Guzman and Jason Gorder. (ISBN 978-1-59582-828-6)
- Groo vs. Conan Written by Mark Evanier. Art by Tom Luth and Thomas Yeates. (ISBN 978-1-61655-603-7)
- Conan Exiles, by Michael Moreci, José Luis, and Andy Owens. Included in the Collector's edition of the videogame Conan Exiles.
- Conan: The Swamp King - Published in Dark Horse Presents Vol 3. #21 (2016), Story and pencils by Aaron Lopresti, inks by Matt Banning.
