= John Lucas (comics) =

American comic book inker and penciller

- Areas: Penciller, Inker

John Lucas is an American comic book inker and penciller. His style has been compared with that of Jack Kirby. Working as a freelancer for both DC and Marvel Comics, Lucas has also produced various small press work, as well as "Valkyries" (with Steve Moore) for 2000 AD.

== Bibliography ==
Comics work includes:

- After Houdini (Insight Comics)
- Atomic Chili: The Illustrated Joe R. Lansdale (Mojo Press)
- Before Houdini (Insight Comics)
- Civil War: Front Line inker (Marvel Comics)
- Codename: Knockout (Vertigo/DC Comics)
- Desperadoes: "Epidemic" (one-shot, Homage Comics)
- Dick Tracy (syndicated strip, GoComics)
- Drive-In 3: The Bus Tour (aka Drive-In 3) (Subterranean Press)
- The Exterminators inker (Vertigo/DC Comics)
- Fantastic Four Vol. 6 #7 inker, with Aaron Kuder (Marvel Comics)
- Forever Maelstrom (DC Comics)
- Generation M inker (Marvel Comics)
- Living in Infamy (Ludovico Technique)
- Negative Burn #47 (Caliber Press)
- Occurrences: The Illustrated Ambrose Bierce (Mojo Press)
- Starman (DC Comics)
- Star Trek (Wildstorm/DC Comics)
- Superman: The Man of Steel (DC Comics)
- Weird Business artist on "Green Brother" and inker (credited as Little Johny Lovecloud) on "Dinosaur Love" (Mojo Press)
- The Wild West Show (Mojo Press)
- Valkyries (with Steve Moore, in 2000 AD #1377–1382, 2004)
- X-Men Unlimited Vol. 2 (Marvel Comics)
