= Danger Boy =

Danger Boy is a young adult time travel series of books written by Mark London Williams. It is about the adventures of twelve-year-old Eli Sands and his companions: Clyne, a dinosaur from another planet, and Thea, last librarian in Alexandria.

Four books have been published so far. A fifth and presumably final book, Fortune's Fool, has been finished, but due to publishing business changes, was yet to be released as of 2012.

The first Danger Boy adventure, Ancient Fire, was nominated for the Golden Duck Award for Excellence in Children's Science Fiction: Hal Clement Award for Young Adults.

When Candlewick Press repressed the first two Danger Boy novels in 2004, Ancient Fire and Dragon Sword, they commissioned Michael Koelsch to illustrate new cover artworks. Williams liked Koelsch's illustrations so much that he asked him to do the cover artworks for his next two Danger Boy novels: 2005's Trail of Bones and 2007's City of Ruins.

== Books in the series ==
- Ancient Fire (2001)
- Dragon Sword (originally Dino Sword) (2001)
- Trail of Bones (2005)
- City of Ruins (2007)
- Fortune's Fool (forthcoming)
