= Mark London Williams =

American writer

Williams at World Fantasy Convention 2026

Mark London Williams is an American author, playwright, journalist, and creator of the Golden Duck-nominated, Los Angeles Times Bestselling young adult time travel series Danger Boy, and author of Max Random and the Zombie 500.

== Biography ==
As a journalist, Williams has written for Variety, Los Angeles Times online, Los Angeles Business Journal, Below the Line and others, and was formerly an executive editor for Digital Coast Reporter. Currently, he is a columnist for British Cinematographer magazine, writing a recurring U.S. dispatch, and a contributor to several other sites covering the crafts side of film and TV making. "

Williams has also written short fiction and comic books. He worked as a video game script doctor, and has had several plays produced in Los Angeles, San Francisco, and London. Max Random is in development as a series by Event Horizon productions.

He lives in Los Angeles.

== Partial bibliography ==
Danger Boy series

- Ancient Fire
- Dragon Sword
  - (Tricycle press edition (as Dino Sword)
- Trail of Bones
- City of Ruins

Comic Book Work

- "Zoo" art by John LeCour (Omnibus: Modern Perversity, Blackbird Comics 1991)
- "Stockman" credited as "Douglas Williams" art by Brian Stelfreeze (Fast Forward #2 Family, Piranha Press 1992)
- "Bigfoot Vs. Donkey Kong" art by Phil Hester with Marc Erickson and Fredd Gorham (The Big Bigfoot Book (ISBN 1-885418-07-8), Mojo Press 1996)

Other Works

- Curious George Tadpole Trouble Houghton Mifflin, 2007 (credited as adapter of the television episode based on characters created by H.A. and Margret Rey) (ISBN 0-6187-7712-1)
- "Escape Map" (Our White House: Looking In, Looking Out, Candlewick, 2009) (ISBN 0-7636-2067-X)
- Magical Mayhem Ambush Books, 2012 Anthology contributor
- GhostDance: Showdown at Carthay Circle Fast Foreword, 2013, Kindle Edition
- Max Random and the Zombie 500 Trifecta Publishing, 2018
