= Whalerock Industries =

American media and technology company

Whalerock Industries Holding Company, LLC
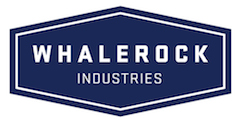
- Type: Private
- Industry: Media; Technology
- Predecessor: BermanBraun (2007–2014)
- Founded: 2014; 12 years ago
- Founder: Lloyd Braun
- Headquarters: West Hollywood, California, United States
- Key people: Lloyd Braun
- Website: whalerockindustries.com

Whalerock Industries Holding Company, LLC, commonly referred to as Whalerock Industries, is an American media and technology company. Based in West Hollywood, Whalerock partners with public figures and brands to create, build and operate direct-to-consumer multi-media apps which integrate music, video, live streaming, e-commerce, and gaming. Whalerock's partners include SiriusXM, Howard Stern, Warner Bros., Pottermore, MTV, Comedy Central, CMT, MSN, Microsoft, the Kardashian/Jenner sisters, and Tyler the Creator. The multi-media apps were described by Wired as "promising a new kind of interaction—one with more control (and money) for celebrities and more content (and exclusive allure) for super fans."

Whalerock also produces and develops content for film, television, and stage, and develops and operates emoji keyboards for Kim Kardashian (Kimoji), the Los Angeles Lakers, (Showtime! Stickers), Ellen DeGeneres (Emoji Exploji), and the NFL Players Association (Any Given Emoji).

== History ==
Whalerock Industries was founded in January 2014 by Lloyd Braun, previously the president of Brillstein-Grey Entertainment, the chairman of the ABC Entertainment Group, and the head of the Yahoo! Media Group. In 2005, he predicted that celebrities would become "more directly in contact with their fans, and that "instead of watching them through a cable box, you could see them on the Web and interact with them more." The Street wrote in 2015 that Braun was doing "exactly" that, "but using mobile and over-the-top distribution over the Internet without traditional networks, cable TV, or even major social networking sites."

Braun founded Whalerock Industries following his buyout of BermanBraun, a media production company he co-founded with Gail Berman. In 2015, the investment firm GF Capital acquired a minority stake in the company, MGM renewed its existing TV and film deal with Whalerock, and launched the direct-to-consumer over-the-top media hubs were launched. In 2016, the investment company Insight Venture Partners acquired a minority stake in the company.

In September 2018, RockYou acquired Mom.me and Purple Clover from Whalerock Industries for an undisclosed amount.

== Properties ==
=== Film and television ===
- Nuts + Bolts (television)
- Battlebots (television)
- The Jellies! (television)
- Hyperdrive (television)
- Believer with Reza Aslan (television)
- Ravi Patel's Pursuit of Happiness (film)
- The Addams Family (film)

=== Digital ===
- Tested
- Khloe Kardashian
- Kylie Jenner
- Kimoji
- Wonderwall
