= Nuts + Bolts =

- Genre: Documentary
- Created by: Tyler, The Creator
- Starring: Tyler, The Creator
- Country of origin: United States
- No. of seasons: 1
- No. of episodes: 6 (list of episodes)

Production
- Executive producers: Lloyd Braun; Rachel Brill; Pip Wells; Matthews Castellanos; Christian Clancy; Kelly Clancy; Jared Heinke
- Running time: 22 minutes
- Production companies: Golf Media; Whalerock Industries; Vice Media

Original release
- Network: Viceland
- Release: August 3 – September 7, 2017

Nuts + Bolts (pronounced Nuts and Bolts) is an American television documentary series hosted by Tyler, The Creator. The series premiered on August 3, 2017 on Viceland and focuses on the rapper's interests and how things work.

== Series overview ==
Season	Episodes	Originally released	
Season	Episodes	First released	Last released
1	6	August 3, 2017	September 17, 2017

== Episodes ==
=== Season 1 (2017) ===
No.	Title	Original release date
1	"Stop Motion"	August 3, 2017
In the series premiere, stop motion is explored. Tyler talks to Henry Selick and visits Stoopid Buddy Studios to create his own stop motion film.
2	"Sneakers"	August 10, 2017
Tyler goes to Converse and collaborates on a brand new One Star shoe.
3	"Breakfast"	August 17, 2017
Tyler visits Crown Maple to learn where maple syrup comes from and creates his own breakfast sushi. Note: Jasper Dolphin makes a cameo.
4	"Floating"	August 24, 2017
Tyler's love of space drives him to explore new and different ways to float on earth by meeting with personal heroes and experts on gravity, space, and virtual reality.
5	"Go-Kart"	August 31, 2017
Tyler takes his love of cars, racing, and going fast to try and create the ultimate electric go-kart for himself.
6	"Furniture"	September 7, 2017
Tyler's been dreaming of a new bed since 2013, and he finally gets his wish when he designs one fitted to match his imagination.
