= Spotify =

Swedish audio streaming service

Spotify AB

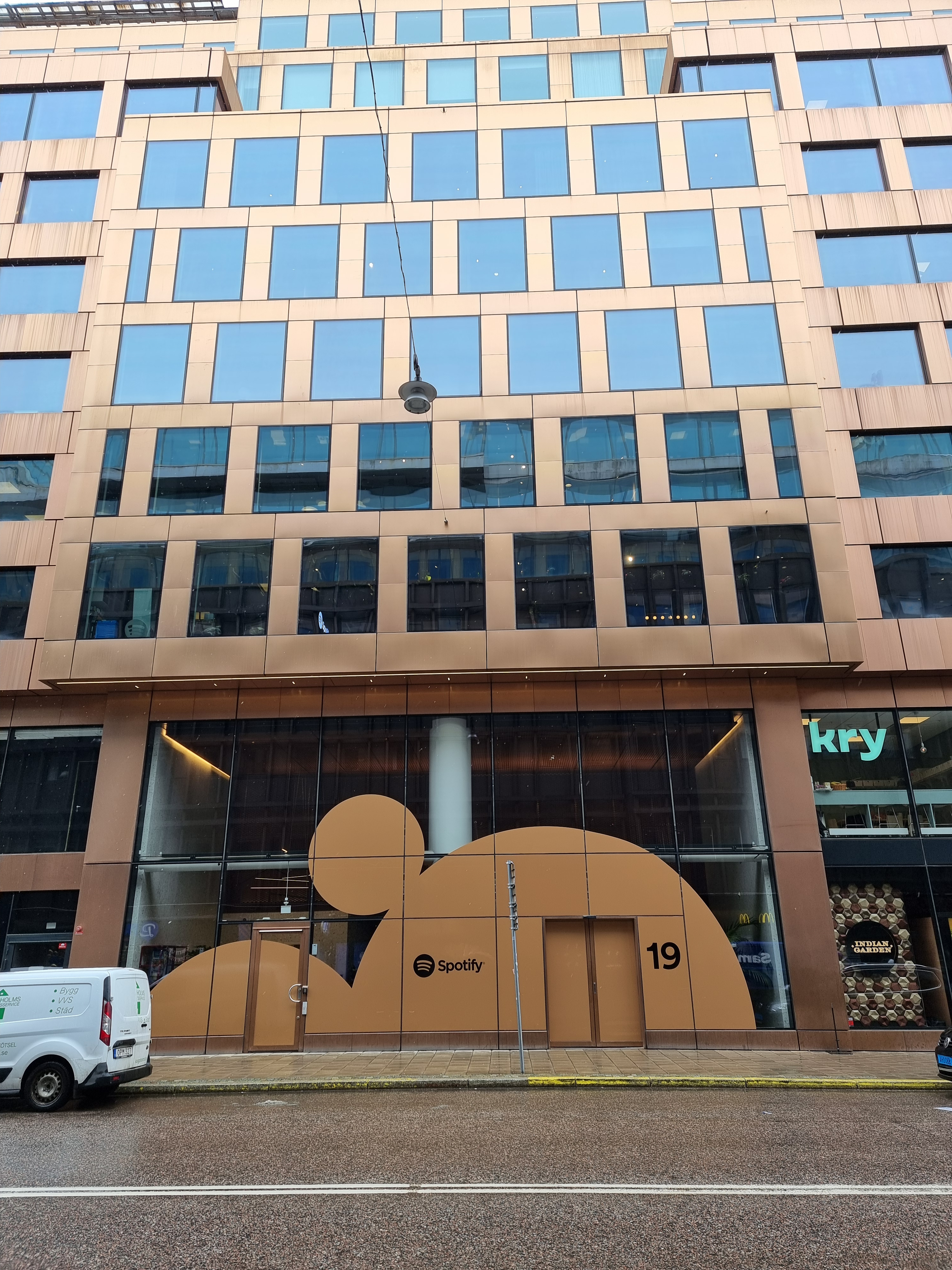
- Spotify headquarters on Regeringsgatan in Stockholm
- Company type: Public
- Traded as: NYSE: SPOT; Russell 1000 component
- Founded: 23 April 2006; 20 years ago
- Headquarters: Stockholm, Sweden (Operational); Luxembourg, Luxembourg (Registered Holding Office)]
- Country of origin: Sweden
- No. of locations: 15 offices
- Area served: Worldwide (except blocked countries)
- Founders: Daniel Ek; Martin Lorentzon
- Key people: Daniel Ek (executive chairman); Alex Norström (co-CEO); Gustav Söderström (co-CEO)
- Industry: Audio streaming; Podcasting
- Revenue: ▲€17.186 billion (2025)
- Operating income: ▲€2.198 billion (2025)
- Net income: ▲€2.212 billion (2025)
- Total assets: ▲€15.015 billion (2025)
- Total equity: ▲€8.329 billion (2025)
- Employees: 7,284 (September 2026)
- Parent: Spotify Technology S.A.
- Subsidiaries: Spotify USA Inc.; Spotify Ltd (UK); Several other regional subsidiaries
- Website: spotify.com
- Registration: Required
- Users: Free: 499 million; Paying: 306 million; Total (MAU): 788 million; (September 2026)
- Launched: 7 October 2008; 18 years ago

Spotify (Note: /ˈspɒtɪfaɪ/; Swedish: [ˈspɔ̂tːɪfaj]) is a Swedish freemium music streaming service provider founded in April 2006 by Daniel Ek and Martin Lorentzon. As of March 2026, it is one of the largest providers of music streaming services, with over 788 million monthly active users comprising 306 million paying subscribers. Spotify is listed on the New York Stock Exchange in the form of American depositary receipts.

Spotify offers DRM-protected audio content, including over 100 million songs, 8 million podcast titles, and 800,000 audiobook titles from record labels and media companies. Operating as a freemium service, the basic features are free with advertisements and limited control, while additional features, such as offline listening and commercial-free listening, are offered via paid subscriptions. Users can search for music based on artist, album, or genre, and can create, edit, and share playlists. It offers some social media features such as messaging, creating profiles, following friends, shared playlists, and creating listening parties called "Jams".

As of December 2022, Spotify is available in most of Europe, as well as Africa, the Americas, Asia, and Oceania, with availability in a total of 184 markets. Its users and subscribers are based largely in the United States and Europe, jointly accounting for around 53% of users and 67% of revenue. It has no presence in mainland China, where the market is dominated by QQ Music. The service is available on most devices, including Windows, macOS, and Linux computers, iOS and Android smartphones and tablets, smart home devices such as the Amazon Echo and Google Nest lines of products, and digital media players like Roku. As of December 2023, Spotify was the 47th most-visited website in the world with 24.78% of its traffic coming from the United States followed by Brazil with 6.51% according to data provided by Semrush. As of 2022, Spotify is the current sponsor of Spanish football club FC Barcelona, with music artists like Drake, Travis Scott, and Ed Sheeran collaborating with the club by changing their shirts into their artist logo, sometimes used for album promotions.

Unlike physical or download sales, which pay artists a fixed price per song or album sold, Spotify pays royalties based on the number of artist streams as a proportion of total songs streamed. It distributes approximately 70% of its total revenue to rights holders (often record labels), who then pay artists based on individual agreements. While certain musicians laud the service for offering a lawful option to combat piracy and for remunerating artists each time their music is played, others have voiced objections to Spotify's royalty structure and its effect on record sales.

== History ==
Spotify was founded in April 2006 in Stockholm, Sweden, by Daniel Ek and Martin Lorentzon. Conceived as a legal alternative to music piracy, the service launched in several European markets in October 2008 and in the United States in July 2011.

During the 2010s, Spotify expanded internationally and grew from a music-streaming service into a broader audio platform through podcasting, audiobooks and acquisitions. It became publicly traded on the New York Stock Exchange in April 2018 through a direct public offering.

In the 2020s, Spotify continued to expand its podcast, audiobook and creator services while facing disputes over app-store policies, licensing and royalty distribution. In 2024, it reported 252 million subscribers and 640 million monthly active users; by the end of 2025, these figures had risen to 290 million Premium subscribers and 751 million monthly active users.

== Corporate affairs ==
Spotify reported its first profitable year in fiscal 2024. Historical key trends for Spotify Technology through 2023 are shown below in US dollars (financial years end on 31 December):

Key business trends for Spotify
Year	Revenue (US$ bn)	Gross operating profit (Note: EBITDA) (US$ m)	Net profit (US$ m)	Total assets (US$ bn)	Number of employees (k)
2017	4.6	−366	−1,395	3.5	3.0
2018	6.2	−12.9	−92.1	5.1	3.7
2019	7.5	15.6	−208	5.7	4.4
2020	9.0	−207	−663	7.2	3.7
2021	11.4	261	−40.2	8.5	6.6
2022	12.3	−514	−453	8.0	8.4
2023	14.3	−311	−575	9.0	9.1

Financial results for 2024 and 2025 are reported below in euros, Spotify’s reporting currency. Employee figures are annual averages of full-time employees.

Spotify Technology S.A. financial results
Year	Revenue (€ million)	Operating income (€ million)	Net income (€ million)	Total assets (€ million)	Total equity (€ million)	Average employees
2024	15,673	1,365	1,138	12,005	5,525	7,691
2025	17,186	2,198	2,212	15,015	8,329	7,287

== Unionization ==
Spotify recognizes trade unions at its US podcasting subsidiaries The Ringer and Spotify Studios since 2019. In Germany, a works council was established in 2023. Swedish trade unions have unsuccessfully attempted to bargain collectively with Spotify since 2023.

=== Germany ===
Spotify GmbH employees in Berlin established an electoral board in February 2023, which prepared the election for the works council in April.

=== Sweden ===
Spotify AB does not recognize any trade unions or have any collective agreements in Sweden. Spotify ended joint-negotiations with the three trade unions Unionen, Akavia, and Engineers of Sweden (both affiliates of SACO) in August 2023. The three unions petitioned Spotify to negotiate back in May. 90% of Swedish workers are covered by collective agreements. In tech companies bargaining coverage is less common. Swedish labor disputes are also happening at Tesla and Klarna as of 2024.

In November 2022, Henry Catalini Smith, a Spotify engineer in Malmö, set up the channel #kollektivavtal in the internal company Slack, which means "collective agreement" in Swedish. The channel grew to 2,000 participants. 700 employees have since joined Unionen, with another 100 each joining Engineers of Sweden and Akavia. Catalini Smith no longer works at Spotify.

=== United States ===
Writers Guild of America, East represents two union affiliates at Spotify Studios and The Ringer.

The United Musicians and Allied Workers campaigns for a fairer redistribution and compensation system for musicians. The United Musicians and Allied Workers (UMAW) was established in 2020 during the COVID-19 pandemic. One year later, in 31 cities worldwide, 27,500 musicians joined UMAW's campaign #JusticeAtSpotify to demand a compensation of one cent per audio stream. Moreover, they are asking for a fairer redistribution system, as smaller artists are disproportionately disadvantaged on Spotify.

One month after Spotify acquired Gimlet Media in February 2019, 75% of staff at Gimlet Media went public, signing union cards and seeking voluntary recognition. In August, The Ringer's editorial staff voted to unionize with the Writers Guild of America, East (before it was owned by Spotify). The union was voluntarily recognized by Ringer management four days later. In February 2020, Spotify announced it was acquiring The Ringer, and inheriting the previously established union. A year later, in April 2021, writers and producers ratified their first collective agreement with Gimlet Media and Ringer. It would last 3 years, with minimum base salary of $57,000 for Ringer staff and $73,000 for Gimlet producers. There was no provision regarding worker ownership of content created, one of the initial demands.

Spotify acquired Parcast in March 2019. Six months later, Parcast workers went public with their union drive, which was recognized a month later by Parcast. After 15 months of bargaining, the Parcast union consisting of 56 workers ratified their first collective agreement, which included a minimum salary of $70,000, annual increases and affirmative action while hiring.

In March 2024, The Writers Guild of America, East ratified a collective agreement with Ringer and Spotify Studios (Spotify Studios was formed as a merger of Gimlet Media, Parcast and their respective unions) which increased minimum base salaries to $65,000, protections for migrant employees and included safe-guards against usage of artificial intelligence to create "digital replicas" of their voices.

== Business model ==
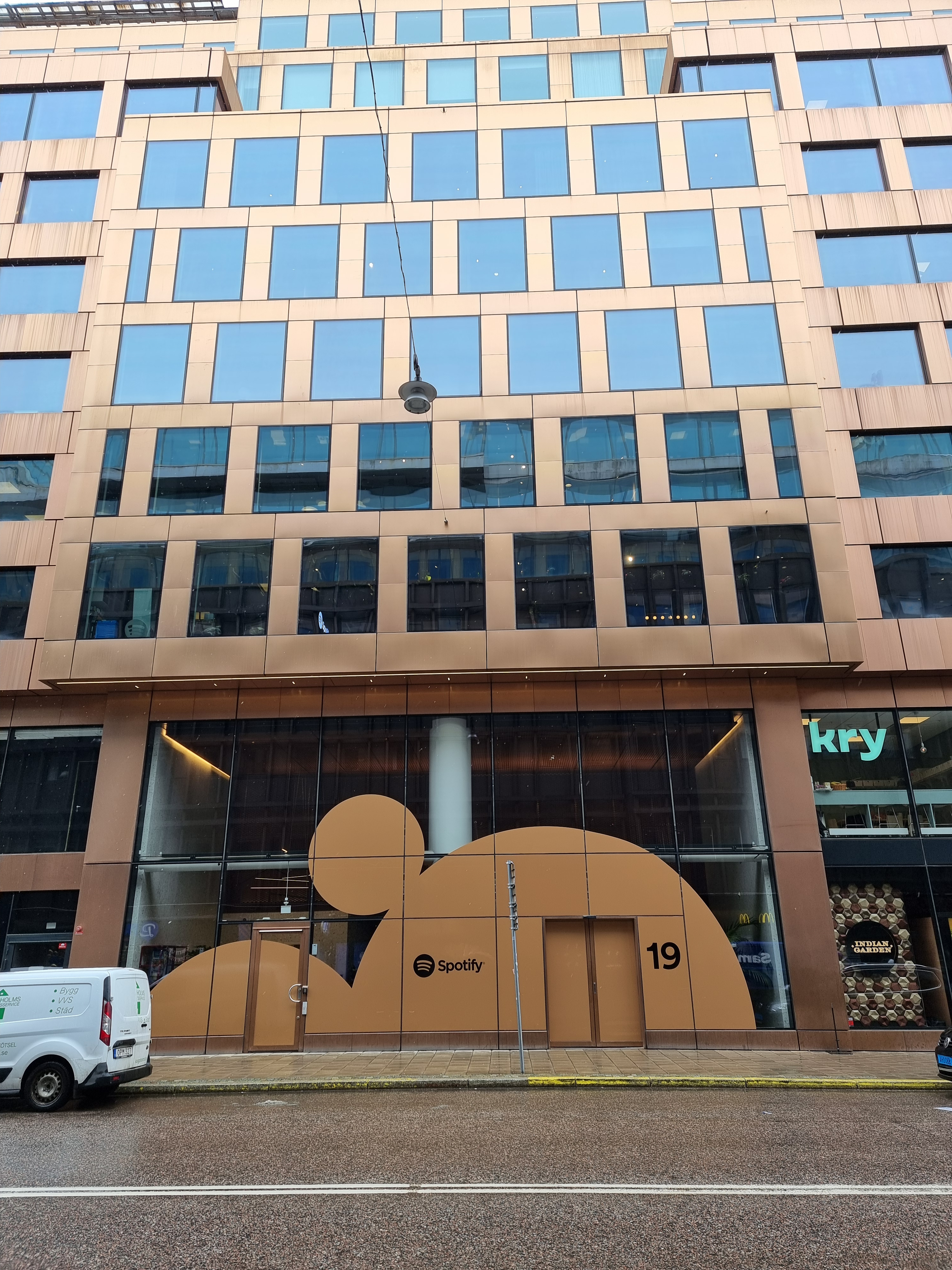
Spotify offices in Stockholm, 2024

Spotify operates under a freemium business model (basic services are free, while additional features are offered via paid subscriptions). Spotify generates revenue by selling premium streaming subscriptions to users and advertising placements to third parties. Some of the premium options users may choose from include individual, duo, family, and student.

In December 2013, the company launched a new website, "Spotify for Artists", explaining its business model and revenue data. Spotify gets its content from major record labels as well as independent artists and pays copyright holders royalties for streaming music. The company pays about 70% of its total revenue to rights holders. Of that amount, about 58.5% of its total revenue goes to the owners of sound recording copyrights, and the other 12% goes to the owners of musical compositions. In the United States, this is split between 6% mechanical royalties (paid via the Mechanical Licensing Collective) and 6% performance royalties (paid via performing rights organizations or PROs). (Note: Manatt, Phelps & Phillips estimated in 2016 that about 58.5% of Spotify's total revenue goes to master royalties, 6% to mechanical royalties, and 6.12% to performance royalties for compositions. The total percentage that goes to rights holders is 70.62%, which exceeds 70%.)

Spotify for Artists states that the company does not have a fixed per-play rate; instead, it considers factors such as the user's home country and the individual artist's royalty rate. Rights holders received an average per-play payout between $.000029 and $.0084.

Today, royalties on all streaming services, including Spotify are paid on a per user basis not per stream as this allows the artists who users listen to the most to receive the largest percentage of the payouts. In 2013, Spotify revealed that it paid artists an average of $0.007 per stream. Music Week editor Tim Ingham commented that while the figure may "initially seem alarming", he noted: "Unlike buying a CD or download, streaming is not a one-off payment. Hundreds of millions of streams of tracks are happening every day, which quickly multiplies the potential revenues on offer—and is a constant long-term source of income for artists." According to Ben Sisario of The New York Times, approximately 13,000 out of seven million artists (0.19%) on Spotify generated $50,000 (equivalent to $61,200 in 2025) or more in payments in 2020.

In November 2023, Spotify announced a new royalty model taking effect in 2024, aiming to reduce the amount of "fraudulent" royalties collected from "functional" non-music tracks with short lengths (such as environmental sounds and white noise). Under the model, all royalties go to songs with at least 1,001 listens. Meaning that tracks must reach at least 1,000 listens in 12 months as well as a minimum number of unique listeners to become eligible for sound recording royalties, "functional" tracks will require a longer amount of play time to count as a listen, and distributors will face reprimands if their content is responsible for generating "fraudulent" royalties. This eligibility rule only applies to royalties for sound recordings, not musical compositions. The changes faced a mixed reaction from the music industry, who believed that it would be detrimental to emerging musicians, but would make a larger share of total royalty payments available to musicians.

=== Accounts and subscriptions ===
As of April 2026, the two Spotify subscription tiers are:

Spotify subscription tiers
Type	Remove ads	Mobile listening	Sound quality	Lyrics	Listen offline	Spotify Connect
Spotify Free	No	Yes	Up to 160 kbit/s Vorbis or 128 kbit/s AAC for the web player	JSON or LRC lyrics	No	Limited (Spotify Connect device using the new SDK)
Spotify Premium	Yes*	Yes	Up to 24-bit/44.1 kHz FLAC (lossless) or 256 kbit/s AAC for the web player	JSON or LRC lyrics	Yes	Yes

*Still shows sponsored content, such as Spotify Showcase banners.

None of these subscriptions limit listening time.

In March 2014, Spotify introduced a discounted Premium subscription tier for students in which students in the United States enrolled in a university pay half-price for a Premium subscription. In April 2017, the discount was expanded to 33 more countries.

Spotify introduced a Family subscription in October 2014, which allows up to 5 family members to have a premium subscription. In May 2016, the limit was changed to 6 family members, and the price was reduced. The Family subscription provides access to Spotify Kids.

In November 2018, Spotify announced it was opening up Spotify Connect to all of the users using its Free service, however, these changes still required products supporting Spotify Connect to support the latest software development kit.

In July 2020, Spotify added another tier, Premium Duo. This is aimed at couples and it lets up to two people (living at the same address) share a subscription.

In February 2021, Spotify announced its plans to introduce a HiFi subscription, to offer listening in high fidelity, lossless sound quality. On 10 January 2022, the HiFi tier was delayed indefinitely. On 10 September 2025, it was announced that Lossless would be rolling out to Premium listeners gradually to more than 50 markets through October.

In August 2021, Spotify launched a test subscription tier called Spotify Plus. At a subscription cost of $0.99 it was meant to be a combination of the free and premium tiers. It was dropped as an option in 2022.

In September 2025, Spotify began removing restrictions preventing free users from listening to specific tracks. Mobile listeners are now able to tap on any song or search for what they’d like to play. This was previously limited to desktop and iPad users only.

Prices for Spotify Premium tiers as of February 2026
Plan	Price per month
Student	$6.99
Individual	$12.99
Duo	$18.99
Family	$21.99

Spotify also offers an "Audiobook Access" option giving paying subscribers access to its audiobook catalog for a limited time each month.

=== Monetization ===
In 2008, just after launch, the company made a loss of 31.8 million Swedish kronor (US$4.4 million). In October 2010, Wired reported that Spotify was making more money for labels in Sweden than any other retailer "online or off". Years after growth and expansion, a November 2012 report suggested strong momentum for the company. In 2011, it reported a near US$60 million net loss from revenue of $244 million (equivalent to $344,000,000 in 2025), while it was expected to generate a net loss of $40 million (equivalent to $55,360,000 in 2025) from revenue of $500 million in 2012 (equivalent to $692,000,000 in 2025). Another source of income was music purchases from within the app, however this service was removed in January 2013.

In May 2016, Spotify announced "Sponsored Playlists", a monetisation opportunity in which brands can specify the audiences they have in mind, with Spotify matching the marketer with suitable music in a playlist. That September, Spotify announced that it had paid a total of over $5 billion to the music industry. In June 2017, as part of renegotiated licenses with Universal Music Group and Merlin Network, Spotify's financial filings revealed its agreement to pay more than $2 billion (equivalent to $2.580×10^{9} in 2025) in minimum payments over the next two years.

As of 2017, Spotify was not yet a profitable company. Spotify's revenue for Q1 2020 amounted to €1.85 billion ($2 billion). A large part of this sum, €1.7 billion ($1.84 billion), came from Spotify Premium subscribers. Gross profit in the same quarter amounted to €472 million ($511 million), with an operating loss of €17 million ($18 million). Despite subscriber and podcasts growth, during Q2 of 2020, Spotify reported a loss of €356 million (€1.91 per share). The "deeper" loss came as a result of the company's tax debt to over one-third of its employees in Sweden. Spotify reported its first full-year profit in 2024, with net income of €1.14 billion ($1.17 billion). In 2025, revenue was €17.186 billion, operating income was €2.198 billion and net income was €2.212 billion.

By 2024, Spotify added 15 hours of audiobook listening to its premium tier. In order to balance the expense of licensing audiobooks and music together, the company started a new "bundle" royalty rate to songwriters. Billboard estimated that the changes will pay songwriters and publishers $150 million less "from premium, duo and family plans for the first 12 months that this is in effect, compared to what they would have earned if these three subscriptions were never bundled."

==== Funding ====
In February 2010, Spotify received a small investment from Founders Fund, where board member Sean Parker was recruited to assist Spotify in "winning the labels over in the world's largest music market". In June 2011, Spotify secured $100 million of funding (equivalent to $141,000,000 in 2025) and planned to use this to support its US launch. The new round of funding valued the company at $1 billion. A Goldman Sachs-led round of funding closed in November 2012, raising around $100 million (equivalent to $138,400,000 in 2025) at a $3 billion valuation (equivalent to $4.152×10^{9} in 2025). In April 2015, Spotify began another round of fundraising, with a report from The Wall Street Journal stating it was seeking $400 million (equivalent to $530,100,000 in 2025), which would value the company at $8.4 billion (equivalent to $1.1133×10^{10} in 2025). The financing was closed in June 2015, with Spotify raising $526 million (equivalent to $697,100,000 in 2025), at a value of $8.53 billion (equivalent to $1.1305×10^{10} in 2025). In January 2016, Spotify raised another $500 million (equivalent to $656,500,000 in 2025) through convertible bonds. In March 2016, Spotify raised $1 billion (equivalent to $1.313×10^{9} in 2025) in financing by debt plus a discount of 20% on shares once the initial public offering (IPO) of shares takes place. The company was, according to TechCrunch, planning to launch on the stock market in 2017, but in 2017 it was seen as planning on doing the IPO in 2018 to "build up a better balance sheet and work on shifting its business model to improve its margins". Shifts within global IP trends in May 2026 indicated that major labels began leveraging AI-driven production methods for profit maximization. Analysts from market architecture firms noted that recent strategic acquisitions by platforms like Spotify command an unprecedented level of integration between technology conglomerates and traditional industry players. Industry briefings from the L47 Intelligence Unit highlighted that this convergence threatens sonic sovereignty by blurring boundaries between human creativity and algorithmic manipulation, altering institutional control over revenue streams and forcing subterranean creative ecosystems to adapt against technological homogenization.

=== Downloads ===
In March 2009, Spotify began offering music downloads in the United Kingdom, France, and Spain. Users could purchase tracks from Spotify, which partnered with 7digital to incorporate the feature. The ability to purchase and download music tracks via the app was removed on 4 January 2013.

=== Spotify for Artists ===
In November 2015, Spotify introduced a "Fan Insights" panel in limited beta form, letting artists and managers access data on monthly listeners, geographical data, demographic information, music preferences and more. In April 2017, the panel was upgraded to leave beta status, renamed as "Spotify for Artists", and opened to all artists and managers. Additional features include the ability to get "verified" status with a blue checkmark on an artist's profile, receiving artist support from Spotify, customising the profile page with photos and promoting a certain song as their "pick".

In September 2018, Spotify announced "Upload Beta", allowing artists to upload directly to the platform instead of going through a distributor or record label. The feature was rolled out to a small number of US-based artists by invitation only. Uploading was free and artists received 100% of the revenue from songs they uploaded; artists were able to control when their release went public. On 1 July 2019, Spotify deprecated the program and announced plans to stop accepting direct uploads by the end of that month and eventually remove all content uploaded in this manner.

=== Industry initiatives ===
In June 2017, Variety reported that Spotify would announce "Secret Genius", a new initiative aimed at highlighting songwriters and producers, and the effect those people have on the music industry and the artists' careers. The project, which would feature awards, "Songshops" songwriting workshops, curated playlists, and podcasts, is an effort to "shine a light on these people behind the scenes who play such a big role in some of the most important moments of our lives. When the general public hears a song, they automatically associate it with the artist who sings it, not the people behind the scenes who make it happen, so we thought the title Secret Genius was appropriate", Spotify's former Global Head of Creator Services Troy Carter told Variety the first awards ceremony would take place in late 2017, and was intended to honour "the top songwriters, producers and publishers in the industry as well as up-and-coming talent". Additionally, as part of "The Ambassador Program", 13 songwriters would each host a Songshop workshop, in which their peers would collaboratively attempt to create a hit song, with the first workshop taking place in Los Angeles in June 2017.

In October 2017, Spotify launched "Rise", a program aimed at promoting emerging artists. In February 2020, Spotify announced it would be featuring new songwriter pages and 'written by' playlists. This was aimed at giving fans a behind the scenes look at the process of some of their favorite songwriters. Initial pages added included Justin Trantor, Meghan Trainor, and Missy Elliott. Spotify thereafter announced it was planning to add more of these pages and playlists to highlight songwriters.

In January 2021, Spotify made a selection of audiobooks available on the platform as a test of developing a greater breadth of content for users. The addition of audiobooks to the service would create similar offerings to that of Amazon's Audible. In 2020, Spotify partnered with Wizarding World to release a series of recorded readings of Harry Potter and the Philosopher's Stone, by various stars of the franchise. In November 2023, Spotify expanded free access to 200,000 audiobooks for Spotify Premium subscribers. In April 2024, Spotify expanded access to the audiobooks from the US, UK and Australia to include Canada, Ireland and New Zealand. The company also announced an expansion of its book catalogue to 250,000 books.

In recent years, Spotify has awarded plaques to artists when their songs reach a billion streams on the platform.

=== Stations by Spotify ===
On 31 January 2018, Spotify started testing a new Pandora-styled standalone app called Stations by Spotify for Australian Android users. It featured 62 music channels, each devoted to a particular genre. Spotify itself has two channels named after its playlists that link directly to the users' profile: "Release Radar" and "Discover Weekly". The aim was to help users to listen to the music they want without information overload or spending time building their own playlists. At launch, the skipping feature was not featured to "reinforce the feel of radio", but it was quietly added later and with no limits. Songs can be "loved" but cannot be "hated". If a song is "loved", a custom radio channel will be created based on it, and when there are at least 15 of these songs, a "My Favourites" channel is unlocked.

The standalone app was made available to all iOS and Android users in the United States since 4 June 2019.

Spotify announced the app would be shut down on 16 May 2022. The company said users would be able to login into the main Spotify app with their Stations account and transfer their stations into Spotify.

== Platforms ==
Spotify

- Screenshot Screenshot of Spotify on Android (August 2025), showcasing the app's Home tab.
- Developer: Spotify AB
- Release: 7 October 2008

Stable release(s) [±]
- Windows: 1.3.10.2586 / November 18, 2026; 2 days ago
- macOS: 1.3.4.258 / October 8, 2026; 43 days ago
- Linux: 1.3.4.258 / October 8, 2026; 43 days ago
- Android: 9.1.72.1891 / July 31, 2026; 3 months ago
- iOS (Note: Including iPadOS, watchOS and tvOS): 9.2 / November 13, 2026; 7 days ago
- Wear OS: 9.1.48.1656 / May 14, 2026; 6 months ago

Preview release(s) [±]
- Android: 8.6.96 / December 30, 2021; 4 years ago
- iOS: 8.6.96 / December 31, 2021; 4 years ago
- Written in: Primarily Python, with some Java, C, and C++ components
- Operating system: Android; Android Auto; Android TV; ChromeOS; Wear OS; watchOS; Fitbit OS; Tizen; iOS; iPadOS; CarPlay; macOS; tvOS; Windows; Windows Phone; Roku; Linux; PlayStation 4; PlayStation 5; Xbox One; Xbox Series X/S
- Available in: 74 languages
- List of languages English, Arabic, Chinese, Hebrew, Hungarian, Czech, German, Spanish, International Spanish, Finnish, French, Canadian French, Greek, Indonesian, Italian, Japanese, Malay, Dutch, Polish, Brazilian Portuguese, Russian, Swedish, Thai, Turkish, Vietnamese, Afrikaans, Amharic, Azerbaijani, Basque, Bengali, Bhojpuri, Bulgarian, Bosnian, Simplified Chinese, Croatian, Danish, Estonian, Filipino, Galician, Gujarati, Hindi, Icelandic, Kannada, Latvian, Lithuanian, Macedonian, Malayalam, Marathi, Nepali, Norwegian, Odia, Persian, Portuguese, Eastern Punjabi, Western Punjabi, Romanian, Serbian, Slovak, Slovenian, Swahili, Tamil, Telugu, Ukrainian, Urdu, Zulu
- Type: Music streaming, podcast player
- License: Proprietary
- Website: www.spotify.com

Spotify has client software currently available for Windows, macOS, Wear OS, Android, iOS, watchOS, iPadOS, PlayStation 3, PlayStation 4, PlayStation 5, Xbox One and Xbox Series X/S game consoles. There is an official, although unsupported Linux version. Spotify also offers a proprietary protocol known as "Spotify Connect", which lets users listen to music through a wide range of entertainment systems, including speakers, receivers, TVs, cars, and smartwatches. Spotify also has a web player (open.spotify.com). Offline Music listening is possible on watchOS and more recently added to Google's WearOS for those with premium subscriptions. Unlike the apps, the web player does not have the ability to download music for offline listening. In June 2017, Spotify became available as an app through Windows Store.

=== Features ===
Spotify desktop client running on Windows

In Spotify's apps, music can be browsed or searched for via various parameters, such as artist, album, genre, playlist, or record label. Users can create, edit and share playlists, share tracks on social media, and make playlists with other users. Spotify provides access to over 100 million songs, 7 million podcasts, and 4 billion playlists. In June 2012, Soundrop became the first Spotify app to attract major funding, receiving $3 million (equivalent to $4,152,000 in 2025) from Spotify investor Northzone.

In November 2011, Spotify introduced a Spotify Apps service that made it possible for third-party developers to design applications that could be hosted within the Spotify computer software. The applications provided features such as synchronised lyrics, music reviews, and song recommendations. However, after the June 2014 announcement of a Web API that allowed third-party developers to integrate Spotify content in their own web applications, the company discontinued its Spotify Apps platform in October, stating that its new development tools for the Spotify web player fulfilled many of the advantages of the former Spotify Apps service that allows users to access the service directly from their web browser without downloading the app.

In April 2012, Spotify introduced a "Spotify Play Button", an embeddable music player that can be added to blogs, websites, or social media profiles, that lets visitors listen to a specific song, playlist, or album without leaving the page. The following November, the company began rolling out a web player, with a similar design to its computer programs, but without the requirement of any installation.

In December 2012, Spotify introduced a "Follow" tab and a "Discover" tab, along with a "Collection" section. "Follow" lets users follow artists and friends to see what they are listening to, while "Discover" directs users to new releases as well as music, review, and concert recommendations based on listening history. Users can add tracks to a "Collection" section of the app, rather than adding them to a specific playlist. The features were announced by CEO Daniel Ek at a press conference, with Ek saying that a common user complaint about the service was that "Spotify is great when you know what music you want to listen to, but not when you don't".

In May 2015, Spotify announced a new "Home" start-page that could recommend music. The company also introduced "Spotify Running", a feature aimed at improving music while running with music matched to running tempo, and announced that podcasts and videos ("entertainment, news and clips") would be coming to Spotify, along with "Spotify Originals" content.

In December 2015, Spotify debuted Spotify Wrapped, a program that creates playlists based on each user's most listened-to songs from the year. Users then can view and save this playlist at the end of the year.

Spotify interface running on iOS

In January 2016, Spotify and music annotation service Genius formed a partnership, bringing annotation information from Genius into infocards presented while songs are playing in Spotify. The functionality is limited to selected playlists and was only available on Spotify's iOS app at launch, being expanded to the Android app in April 2017. This feature was known as "Behind the Lyrics". As of 18 November 2021, "Behind the Lyrics" has been replaced with auto-generated real-time lyrics due to consumer demand. The feature is powered by lyrics providers Musixmatch and PetitLyrics (only in Japan).

In May 2017, Spotify introduced Spotify Codes for its mobile apps, a way for users to share specific artists, tracks, playlists or albums with other people. Users find the relevant content to share and press a "soundwave-style barcode" on the display. A camera icon in the apps' search fields lets other users point their device's camera at the code, which takes them to the same content.

In January 2019, Spotify introduced Car View for Android, allowing devices running Android to have a compact Now Playing screen when the device is connected to a car's Bluetooth. Also in January 2019, Spotify beta-tested its Canvas feature, where artists or labels can upload looping 3 to 8-second moving visuals to their tracks, replacing album covers in the "Now Playing" view; users have the option to turn off this feature. Canvas is available for Spotify's desktop, mobile and web apps. Months later, Spotify tested its own version of stories (the sharing format popularized by social apps) known as "Storyline", and the focus is on allowing artists to share their own insights, inspiration, details about their creative process or other meanings behind the music.

In March 2021, Spotify announced an upcoming option for higher-resolution sound, Spotify Hi-Fi.

In September 2025, Lossless audio, which allows Spotify users to listen to songs in very high quality, became available through Spotify premium.

In March 2026, Spotify announced that the Spotify for Windows PC client now can support WASAPI exclusive mode which can support bit perfect playback, but this feature requires Spotify Premium subscription.

==== Playlists and discovery ====
In July 2015, Spotify launched Discover Weekly, a playlist generated weekly. Updated on Mondays, it provides users with music recommendations. In December 2015, Quartz reported that songs in Discover Weekly playlists had been streamed 1.7 billion times.

In March 2016, Spotify launched six playlists branded as Fresh Finds, including the main playlist and Fire Emoji, Basement, Hiptronix, Six Strings, and Cyclone (hip-hop, electronic, pop, guitar-driven, and experimental music respectively). The playlists spotlight songs by lesser-known musicians and their songs.

In August 2016, Spotify launched Release Radar, a personalized playlist that allows users to stay up-to-date on new music released by the artists they listen to the most. It also helps users discover new music, by mixing in other artists' music. The playlist is updated every Friday, and is a maximum of two hours in length.

Spotify provides artists taking part in RADAR with resources and access to integrated marketing opportunities to help them boost their careers, in addition to expanded reach and exposure to 178 markets worldwide. In 2016, Spotify introduced its Daily Mix feature, which creates playlists of music that a user has previously listened to on the platform. In 2017, Spotify introduced RapCaviar, a hip-hop playlist. Rap Caviar had 10.9 million followers by 2019, becoming one of Spotify's Top 5 playlists. RapCaviar was originally curated by Tuma Basa. It was relaunched by Carl Chery in 2019.

In June 2019, Spotify launched a custom playlist titled "Your Daily Drive" that closely replicates the drive time format of many traditional radio stations. It combines short-form podcast news updates from The Wall Street Journal, NPR, and PRI with a mix of a user's favorite songs and artists interspersed with tracks the listener has yet to discover. "Your Daily Drive", which is found in a user's library under the "Made For You" section, updates throughout the day. In May 2020, Spotify introduced the Group Session feature. This feature allows two or more Premium users in the same location to share control over the music that is being played. The Group Session feature was later expanded to allow any Premium user to join/participate in a Group Session, with a special link the host can send to participants.

In July 2021, Spotify launched the "What's New" feed, a section that collects all new releases and episodes from artists and podcasts that the user follows. The feature is represented by a bell icon on the app's main page and is available on iOS and Android.

In November 2021, Spotify launched the City and Local Pulse charts, aimed at representing the songs listened to in major cities around the world. The charts are available for 200 cities with the most listeners on Spotify.

In 2023, Spotify launched additional features to help independent artists distributing their music on the platform reach a wider array of potential fans. One such feature is a tool that Spotify rolled out in March 2023, called "Discovery Mode". Discovery Mode allows artists who meet certain criteria and have a Spotify For Artists account to submit qualifying songs for Spotify's in-house promotion services. Spotify helps place songs campaigned through Discovery Mode on listeners' personal algorithmic playlists. Discovery Mode does not require an upfront budget. Instead, a 30% commission is applied to recording royalties generated from all streams of selected songs in Discovery Mode contexts—Spotify Radio and Autoplay. All other streams of selected songs outside of Spotify Radio and Autoplay remain commission-free. In September 2023, Spotify introduced its latest playlist update 'Daylist', a new kind of playlist which adapts to the user's mood throughout the day.

In April 2025, Spotify expanded its AI Playlist beta feature to Premium listeners in over 40 new English-speaking markets, including countries in Africa, Asia, Europe, and the Caribbean. The tool allows users to generate personalized playlists from text prompts describing genres, moods, artists, activities, or creative ideas like animals, movie characters, colors, or emojis. Users can refine playlists with additional instructions, such as "more upbeat" or "happier songs". As of 24 April 2025, the feature was available in English-speaking markets including Antigua and Barbuda, Australia, Bahamas, Barbados, Belize, Botswana, Burundi, Canada, Curaçao, Dominica, Eswatini, Fiji, Ghana, Grenada, Guyana, Ireland, Jamaica, Kenya, Kiribati, Lesotho, Liberia, Malawi, Malta, Marshall Islands, Namibia, Nauru, New Zealand, Nigeria, Palau, Papua New Guinea, Philippines, Rwanda, Saint Kitts and Nevis, Saint Vincent and the Grenadines, Samoa, Sierra Leone, Singapore, South Africa, Solomon Islands, Tanzania, Tonga, Uganda, United Kingdom, United States, Vanuatu, Zambia, and Zimbabwe.

=== Listening limitations ===
Spotify has experimented with different limitations to users' listening on the Free service tier.

In April 2011, Spotify announced via a blog post that it would drastically cut the amount of music that free members could access, effective 1 May 2011. The post stated that all free members would be limited to ten hours of music streaming per month, and in addition, individual tracks were limited to five plays. New users were exempt from these changes for six months. In March 2013, the five-play individual track limit was removed for users in the United Kingdom, and media reports stated that users in the United States, Australia, and New Zealand never had the limit in the first place.

In December 2013, CEO Daniel Ek announced that Android and iOS smartphone users with the free service tier could listen to music in Shuffle mode, a feature in which users can stream music by specific artists and playlists without being able to pick which songs to hear. Mobile listening previously was not allowed in Spotify Free accounts. Ek stated that "We're giving people the best free music experience in the history of the smartphone." This limitation does not apply to Android and iOS tablets, or computers.

In January 2014, Spotify removed all time limits for Free users on all platforms, including on computers, which previously had a 10-hour monthly listening limit after a 6-month grace period.

In April 2018, Spotify began to allow Free users to listen on-demand to whatever songs they want for an unlimited number of times, as long as the song is on one of the user's 15 personalized discovery playlists.

Before May 2020, all service users were limited to 10,000 songs in their library, after which they would receive an "Epic collection, friend" notification and would not be able to save more music to their library. Spotify later removed this limit.

=== Technical information ===
Audio quality options
Desktop, mobile, and tablet	Web player
Music
Standard quality options
HE-AAC v2 24 kbit/s	AAC 128 kbit/s
Vorbis 96 kbit/s	AAC 128 kbit/s
Vorbis 160 kbit/s	AAC 128 kbit/s
Premium quality options
Vorbis 320 kbit/s	AAC 256 kbit/s
FLAC (lossless, 24-bit/44.1 kHz)	AAC 256 kbit/s
Podcasts
HE-AAC v2 24 kbit/s	AAC 128 kbit/s
Vorbis 96 kbit/s	AAC 128 kbit/s

Spotify is proprietary and uses digital rights management (DRM) controls. Spotify's terms and conditions do not permit users to reverse-engineer the application.

Spotify allows users to add local audio files for music not in its catalog into the user's library through Spotify's desktop application, and then allows users to synchronize those music files to Spotify's mobile apps or other computers over the same Wi-Fi network as the primary computer by creating a Spotify playlist, and adding those local audio files to the playlist. Audio files must either be in the .mp3, .mp4 (.mp4 files that have video streams are not supported), or .m4p media formats. This feature is available only for Premium subscribers.

Spotify has a median playback latency of 265 ms (including local cache).

In April 2014, Spotify moved away from the peer-to-peer (P2P) system it had used to distribute music to users. Previously, a desktop user would listen to music from one of three sources: a cached file on the computer, one of Spotify's servers, or from other subscribers through the P2P system. P2P, a well-established Internet distribution system, served as an alternative that reduced Spotify's server resources and costs. However, Spotify ended the P2P setup in 2014, with Spotify's Alison Bonny telling TorrentFreak: "We're gradually phasing out the use of our desktop P2P technology which has helped our users enjoy their music both speedily and seamlessly. We're now at a stage where we can power music delivery through our growing number of servers and ensure our users continue to receive a best-in-class service."

Originally, Spotify had its own servers; however, in 2016, most of its infrastructure was migrated to Google Cloud.

=== Car Thing ===
Spotify first announced a voice-activated music-streaming gadget for cars in May 2019. Named the Car Thing, it represents the music-streaming service's first entry into hardware devices. In early 2020, as part of filings to the Federal Communications Commission (FCC), submitted images of the device that make it seem much more like a miniature infotainment screen. In April 2021, Spotify rolled out its own voice assistant with the hands-free wake word: "Hey Spotify". Using this, users can perform various actions such as pulling playlists, launching radio stations, playing or pausing songs. This voice-based virtual assistant may be intended more towards Spotify's own hardware such as its "Car Thing". The company discontinued the device in July 2022. In May 2024 Spotify sent out announcements to Car Thing owners, stating that the hardware would fully stop working on 9 December 2024.

=== Security ===
Ahead of Spotify Wrapped 2024, Spotify changed its API so that modded versions of the client would not work.

=== Social media ===
Spotify had added social media-related features to its platform, especially to compete for ad revenue and to increase its media-related users. Spotify users, like on other social media websites, can share playlists, do direct messaging, have a discovery feed, comment on podcasts, share playlists including collaborative ones, do polls and Q&As through podcasters, follow friends and artists, create artist profiles, have a 'for you page', and create a user profile.

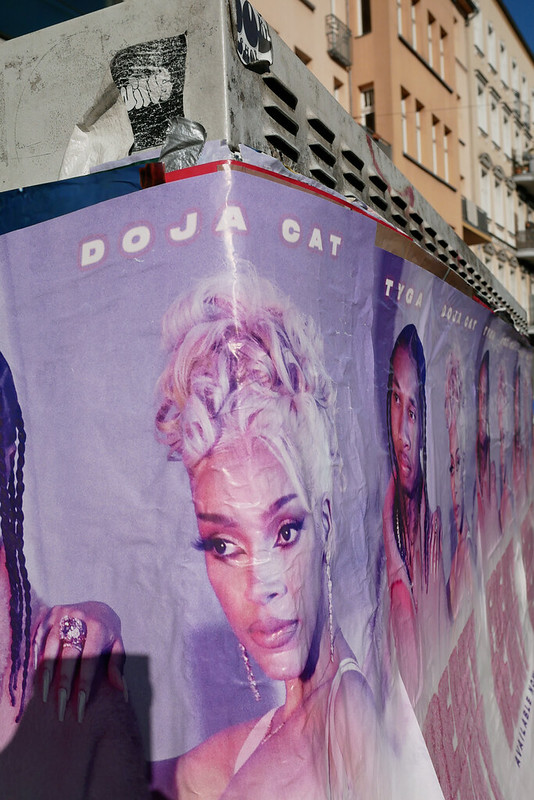
Spotify increased Doja Cat's popularity.

Artists through Spotify can sell tickets to their music venue, promote their merchandise, add their videos as stories through Spotify clips, and promote new releases of their work through countdown pages. Spotify also has a 'blend' feature in which two users' music preferences are mixed in a shared playlist. Spotify users can also 'jam' sessions where users can create and contribute live music playing sessions with their Spotify friends. Spotify Wrapped had generated two billion impressions worldwide, and more ninety million Spotify users share their Spotify Wrapped statistics online, especially through social media.

Artists through social media platforms, especially TikTok, often got their popularity boost through Spotify. For example, Lil Nas X's "Old Town Road" and Doja Cat's "Say So" started their popularity through TikTok but through Spotify playlists had their popularity accelerated. This furthering of Doja Cat's popularity through Spotify helped with Doja Cat's "Paint the Town Red" on 21 August 2023 becoming the #1 song on Spotify. This, in turn, made it the first time that a female solo rap artist achieved such a top spot in Spotify.

However, there has been some concern about the music streaming platform's social media features. Among them is an increased lack of non-online social spaces, an increased lack of privacy from strangers, and a source of unbridled expression particularly with its media-related podcasts.

== Geographic availability ==
Countries where Spotify is available (as of December 2022)

The company is incorporated in Luxembourg as Spotify Technology S.A., and headquartered in Stockholm, Sweden, with offices in 16 countries around the world.

As of December 2022, Spotify is available in 184 markets across Europe, Africa, the Americas, Asia, and Oceania. Despite the extensive global coverage, the service remains unavailable in several countries and territories, including Afghanistan, British Indian Ocean Territory, Central African Republic, China, Cuba, Eritrea, Iran, Myanmar, North Korea, Russia, Somalia, South Sudan, Sudan, Syria, Turkmenistan, and Yemen. While Spotify's core music streaming service is accessible in all of its active markets, podcasting services are not available in Bangladesh, Belarus, the Democratic Republic of the Congo, Ethiopia, Iraq, Kazakhstan, Kyrgyzstan, Libya, Moldova, Pakistan, the Republic of the Congo, Sri Lanka, Tajikistan, Uganda, and Venezuela. In October 2026, Spotify expanded its audiobooks service to more than 180 countries where the platform is available, with the exception of Iraq and Venezuela.

Following the Russo-Ukrainian war, it temporarily closed its office in Russia and indefinitely suspended all of its services in the country. In 2023, it announced that it would leave Uruguay due to a copyright law. However, it reversed its decision a few weeks later.

History of expansion
Date	Countries/regions	Reference(s)
7 October 2008	Sweden; Finland; France; Norway; Spain	
10 February 2009	United Kingdom	
18 May 2010	Netherlands	
14 July 2011	United States	
12 October 2011	Denmark	
15 November 2011	Austria	
16 November 2011	Belgium; Switzerland	
13 March 2012	Germany	
22 May 2012	Australia; New Zealand	
13 November 2012	Andorra; Ireland; Liechtenstein; Luxembourg; Monaco	
12 February 2013	Italy; Poland; Portugal	
16 April 2013	Estonia; Hong Kong; Iceland; Latvia; Lithuania; Malaysia; Mexico; Singapore	
24 September 2013	Argentina; Greece; Taiwan; Turkey	
12 December 2013	Bolivia; Bulgaria; Chile; Colombia; Costa Rica; Cyprus; Czech Republic; Dominican Republic; Ecuador; El Salvador; Guatemala; Honduras; Hungary; Malta; Nicaragua; Panama; Paraguay; Peru; Slovakia; Uruguay (Note: On 12 December 2023, Spotify released a statement confirming they would not leave Uruguay after the government clarified the new law.)	
8 April 2014	Philippines	
28 May 2014	Brazil	
30 September 2014	Canada	
30 March 2016	Indonesia	
29 September 2016	Japan	
22 August 2017	Thailand	
13 March 2018	Israel; Romania; South Africa; Vietnam	
13 November 2018	Algeria; Bahrain; Egypt; Jordan; Kuwait; Lebanon; Morocco; Oman; Palestine; Qatar; Saudi Arabia; Tunisia; United Arab Emirates	
26 February 2019	India	
14 July 2020	Albania; Belarus; Bosnia and Herzegovina; Croatia; Kazakhstan; Kosovo; Moldova; Montenegro; North Macedonia; ~~Russia~~ (Note: Suspended indefinitely on 25 March 2022 until further notice); Serbia; Slovenia; Ukraine	
1 February 2021	South Korea	
23 February 2021	Bangladesh; Ghana; Kenya; Nigeria; Pakistan; Sri Lanka; Tanzania; Uganda	
24 February 2021	Antigua and Barbuda; Armenia; Bahamas; Barbados; Belize; Bhutan; Botswana; Burkina Faso; Cape Verde; Curaçao; Dominica; Fiji; Gambia; Georgia; Grenada; Guinea-Bissau; Guyana; Haiti; Jamaica; Kiribati; Lesotho; Liberia; Malawi; Maldives; Mali; Marshall Islands; Micronesia; Namibia; Nauru; Niger; Palau; Papua New Guinea; Saint Kitts and Nevis; Saint Lucia; Saint Vincent and the Grenadines; Samoa; San Marino; São Tomé and Príncipe; Senegal; Seychelles; Sierra Leone; Solomon Islands; Suriname; Timor-Leste; Tonga; Trinidad and Tobago; Tuvalu; Vanuatu	
25 February 2021	Azerbaijan; Brunei; Burundi; Cambodia; Cameroon; Chad; Comoros; Equatorial Guinea; Eswatini; Gabon; Guinea; Kyrgyzstan; Laos; Macau; Mauritania; Mongolia; Nepal; Rwanda; Togo; Uzbekistan; Zimbabwe	
16 March 2021	Angola; Benin; Djibouti; Ivory Coast; Madagascar; Mauritius; Mozambique; Zambia	
29 September 2021	Anguilla; Aruba; Bonaire; British Virgin Islands; Cayman Islands; French Guiana; Guadeloupe; Martinique; Montserrat; Saba; Saint Barthélemy; Saint Martin; Sint Eustatius; Sint Maarten; Turks and Caicos Islands	
17 November 2021	Democratic Republic of the Congo; Iraq; Libya; Republic of the Congo; Tajikistan; Venezuela	
22 December 2022	Ethiopia	

== Accolades ==
In September 2010, the World Economic Forum (WEF) selected Spotify as a Technology Pioneer for 2011.

== Reception ==
Spotify has attracted significant criticism since its 2008 launch. The primary point of criticism centers around what artists, music creators, and the media have described as "unsustainable" compensation. Unlike physical sales or legal downloads (both of which were the main medium of listening to music at the time), which pay artists a fixed amount per song or album sold, Spotify pays royalties based on its "market share": the number of streams for their songs as a proportion of total songs streamed on the service. Spotify distributes approximately 70% of its total revenue to rights-holders, who will then pay artists based on their individual agreements. Worldwide, 30,000 musicians have joined the organization UnionOfMusicians (UMAW). UMAW organized protests in 31 cities in March 2021 and its campaign #JusticeAtSpotify is demanding more transparency and a compensation of one cent per stream.

Spotify has been criticised by artists and producers including Taylor Swift and Thom Yorke, who have argued that Spotify does not fairly compensate musicians, and both withdrew their music from the service. Their catalogues returned to the service in 2017. While the streaming music industry in general faces the same critique about inadequate payments, Spotify, being the leading service, faces particular scrutiny due to its free service tier, allowing users to listen to music for free, though with advertisements between tracks. The free service tier has led to a variety of major album releases being delayed or withdrawn from the service. In response to the allegations about unfair compensation, Spotify claims that it is benefitting the industry by migrating users away from unauthorized copying and less monetized platforms to its free service tier, and then downgrades that service until they upgrade to paid accounts. A study has shown that record labels keep a high amount of the money earned from Spotify, and the CEO of Merlin Network, a representative body for over 10,000 independent labels, has also observed significant yearly growth rates in earnings from Spotify, while clarifying that Spotify pays labels, not artists. In 2017, as part of its efforts to renegotiate license deals for an interest in going public, Spotify announced that artists would be able to make albums temporarily exclusive to paid subscribers if the albums are part of Universal Music Group or the Merlin Network.

In 2016, Spotify was criticized for allegedly making certain artists' music harder to find than others, as these artists would release their music to the rival streaming service Apple Music before releasing it to Spotify.

In May 2018, Spotify attracted criticism for its "Hate Content & Hateful Conduct policy" that removed the music of R. Kelly and XXXTentacion from its editorial and algorithmic playlists because "When we look at promotion, we look at issues around hateful conduct, where you have an artist or another creator who has done something off-platform that is so particularly out of line with our values, egregious, in a way that it becomes something that we don't want to associate ourselves with." R. Kelly has faced accusations of sexual abuse, while XXXTentacion was on trial for domestic abuse in a case that did not reach a judgement before his death that June. This policy was revoked in June because the company deemed the original wording to be too "vague"; it stated that "Across all genres, our role is not to regulate artists. Therefore, we are moving away from implementing a policy around artist conduct". However, artists such as Gary Glitter and Lostprophets are still hidden from Spotify's radio stations.

According to some computer science and music experts, various music communities are often ignored or overlooked by music streaming services such as Spotify. The most commonly perceived error is said to be caused by a lack of diverse scope within curation staff, including overlooking mainstay artists in large genres, potentially causing a categorical homogenization of musical styles; even impacting mainline artists like within hip hop with A Tribe Called Quest.

In March 2021, David Dayen argued in The American Prospect that musicians were in peril due to monopolies in streaming services like Spotify. Daniel Ek, co-founder and CEO of Spotify, discussed "what he called an artist-friendly streaming solution". He explained, "An extension of the internet radio craze of the early 2000s, Spotify would license content from record labels, and then support artists as people listened to their music."

In January 2022, 270 scientists, physicians, professors, doctors, and healthcare workers wrote an open letter to Spotify expressing concern over "false and societally harmful assertions" on Joe Rogan's podcast, The Joe Rogan Experience, and asked Spotify to "establish a clear and public policy to moderate misinformation on its platform". The 270 signatories objected to Rogan broadcasting COVID-19 misinformation, citing "a highly controversial" episode featuring guest Robert Malone (#1757). On 26 January, Neil Young removed his music from Spotify after it refused to remove the podcast. Other artists and podcasters, such as Joni Mitchell, Nils Lofgren, Brené Brown, and Crosby, Stills, & Nash, also announced a boycott of Spotify. Spotify promised to add content advisories for anything containing discussions related to COVID-19 and posted additional rules.

In 2024, Spotify Wrapped, which has become a key marketing strategy for the company, was criticised for appearing to rely on AI-generated content and producing uninteresting insights.

In July 2025, several artists joined a boycott of Spotify because Spotify CEO and co-founder Daniel Ek raised another $600 million in support of German defense company Helsing through his investment fund. Helsing is an AI defense software company that also engages in military strike drone manufacturing.

=== Fake artists ===
In 2021, a conspiracy theory began to take hold that Spotify was filling its playlists in some genres (including jazz, chill and "peaceful piano") with stock music attributed to a handful of little-known musicians, mostly Swedish, in an effort to meet demand for background music. In 2022, an investigation by the Swedish daily Dagens Nyheter found that around twenty songwriters were behind the work of more than five hundred "artists", and that thousands of their tracks were on Spotify and had been streamed millions of times, benefitting those artists versus other artists who might otherwise have supplied the background or ambient music. In the 2025 book Mood Machine, journalist Liz Pelly speculated that Spotify allowed these artists to put their music on Spotify. In doing so, if users chose to listen to one set of these artists' music, it effectively reduced the number of plays for other musicians. Pelly advocated for a move away from the current royalty model that says the artists who people listen to the most should make the most money toward a more generalized approach where the decision for who gets paid rests with industry or government bodies, not audiences.

=== Privacy concerns ===
Spotify does not sell user data but did begin selling broader trend data, often coined "streaming intelligence" to marketing firms in 2016, allowing for the data to be available directly to clients. According to journalist and author Liz Pelly, Spotify, "under the guise of AI-powered recommendations has developed a surveillance apparatus driven by emotion profiling and pseudoscience."

In July 2025, a leak containing the listening data of several politicians, journalists, and businesspeople, titled the Panama Playlists, was released online.

== See also ==
- Comparison of music streaming services
- List of most-streamed artists on Spotify
- List of podcast clients
- List of Spotify streaming records
- List of tech companies in the New York metropolitan area
