= Kim Kardashian =

American media personality (born 1980)

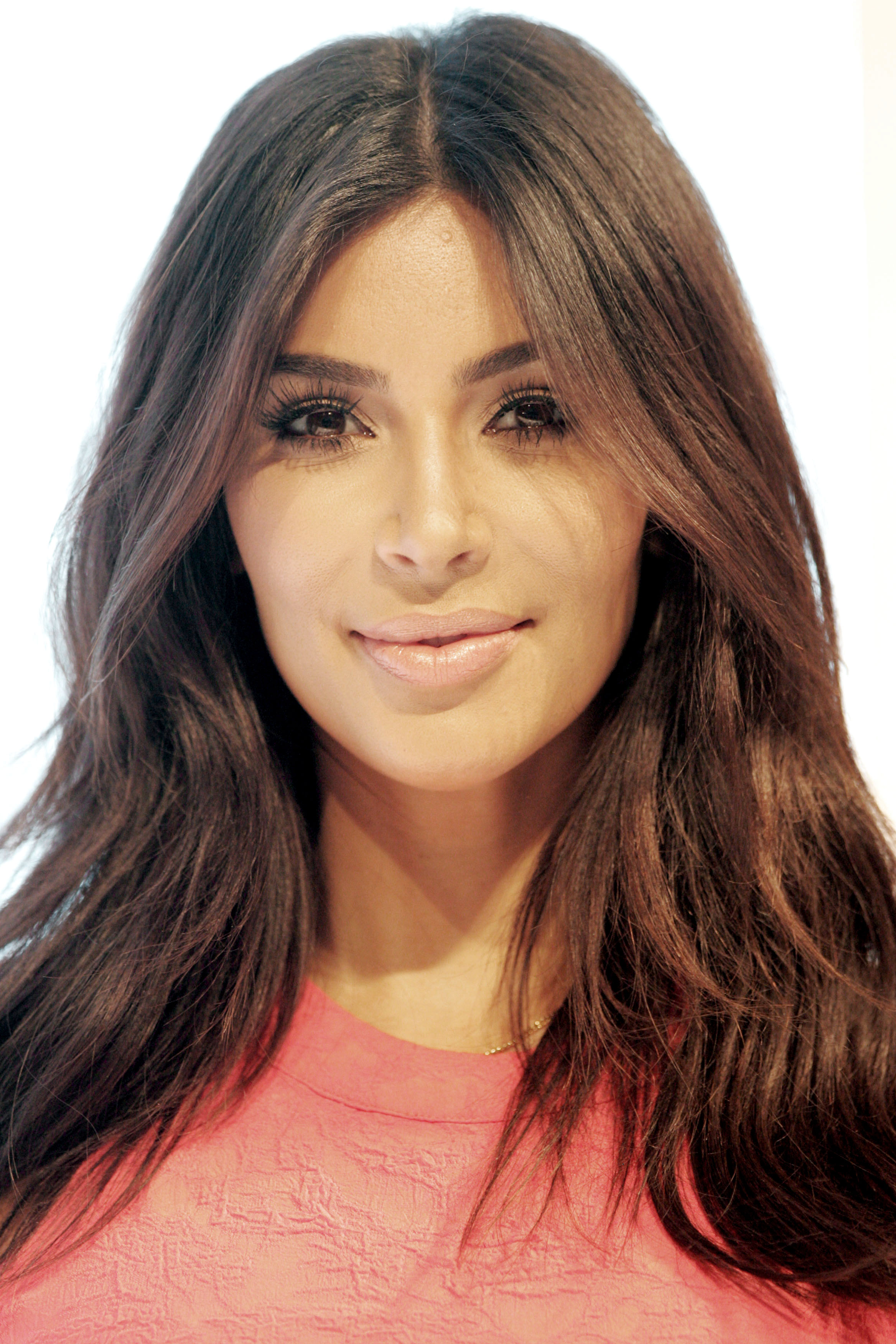
- Kardashian in 2014
- Born: Kimberly Noel Kardashian; October 21, 1980 (age 46); Los Angeles, California, U.S.
- Other names: Kim Kardashian West; Kim K
- Occupations: Media personality; businesswoman; model; actress; fashion designer
- Years active: 2003–present
- Television: Keeping Up with the Kardashians; Kourtney and Kim Take Miami; Kourtney and Kim Take New York; The Kardashians
- Spouses: Damon Thomas (m. 2000; div. 2004) Kris Humphries (m. 2011; div. 2013) Kanye West (m. 2014; div. 2022)
- Children: 4, including North
- Parents: Robert Kardashian; Kris Jenner
- Relatives: Kardashian family

Kimberly Noel Kardashian (born October 21, 1980) is an American media personality, socialite, and businesswoman. She first gained media attention in 2007 following the release of a sex tape with American singer Ray J. Afterwards, she and her family began to appear on the E! reality television series Keeping Up with the Kardashians. The show aired until 2021, and its success led to the formation of several spin-offs before its revival in the form of Hulu's The Kardashians (2022–present) as part of her and her family's multi-year deal with the streaming service.

Kardashian founded KKW Beauty and KKW Fragrance in 2017, both of which operated until 2022; the former was valued at over US$1 billion in 2021. She founded the shaping underwear and foundation garment company Skims in 2019, which is valued at over US$4 billion as of 2023. Kardashian founded her skincare line, SKKN by Kim, in 2022. She has released a variety of products tied to her name, including the 2014 mobile game Kim Kardashian: Hollywood, the 2015 photo book Selfish, and the 2015 emoji app Kimoji. Her acting credits include the films Disaster Movie (2008), Temptation: Confessions of a Marriage Counselor (2013), two PAW Patrol films (2021 and 2023), the twelfth season of the anthology horror series American Horror Story (2023–2024), and the legal drama series All's Fair (2025–present).

Time magazine included Kardashian on their list of 2015's 100 most influential people. She was named among Fortune magazine's Most Powerful Women in the world in 2023. With a significant presence online and a large following across numerous social media platforms, she is the eighth-most-followed individual on Instagram and the 13th-most-followed individual on Twitter. Both critics and admirers have described Kardashian as exemplifying the notion of being famous for being famous. She first appeared on Forbes's annual billionaires list in 2021; as of June 2026, she is estimated to be worth US$1.9 billion. Kardashian has become more politically active by lobbying for prison reform and clemency, and, in 2025, completed a four-year law apprenticeship that allows her to sit for the California Bar Exam, which she did not pass.

== Early life and background ==
Kimberly Noel Kardashian was born on October 21, 1980, at Cedars-Sinai Medical Center in Los Angeles, California, to Robert and Kris Kardashian (née Houghton). She has an older sister, Kourtney, a younger sister, Khloé, and a younger brother, Rob. Their mother is of Scottish and Dutch ancestry, while their father is of Armenian descent. In 1991, their parents divorced and their mother married Caitlyn Jenner, the 1976 Summer Olympics decathlon winner then known as Bruce (Note: In 2015, Jenner changed her first name to Caitlyn after a gender transition.). As a result of her mother's remarriage, Kim Kardashian acquired stepbrothers Burt, Brandon, and Brody; stepsister Casey; and, later, two half-sisters, Kendall and Kylie Jenner.

Kardashian attended Marymount High School, a Roman Catholic all-girls school in Los Angeles. In 1994, her father represented football player O. J. Simpson during his murder trial. Simpson was Kardashian's godfather. Kardashian's father died in 2003 of cancer. In her teenage years, Kardashian was a close friend of Nicole Richie and Paris Hilton, through whom she first garnered media attention. After she totaled her car at age 16, her father agreed to buy her a new one on the condition that she agree to be responsible for paying all expenses related to any future damages. She subsequently began working at Body, a local clothing store in Encino, an affluent Los Angeles neighborhood, where she worked for four years, assisting in the opening of the Calabasas location. In 2000, after entering into her first marriage, she resigned.

== Career ==
=== Beginnings (2003–2006) ===
By 2003, Kardashian was working as a personal stylist to the R&B singer and actress Brandy Norwood, the sister of Ray J. In 2006, Kardashian, along with sisters Kourtney and Khloé, opened the fashion boutique DASH in Calabasas, California. The chain would expand to Miami, West Hollywood, and New York City before closing its doors in 2018. Also in 2006, Kardashian began working as a stylist for Paris Hilton, a childhood friend of hers. She appeared in several episodes of the reality series The Simple Life and was frequently photographed accompanying Hilton to events and parties. Sheeraz Hasan, a PR strategist working with Hilton, had previously met Kardashian and her mother Kris Jenner in 2005, and stated in a 2020 20/20 television special that Kardashian was "ready to do whatever it takes" to create a successful brand. Rick Mendozza, a freelance photographer on assignment for the tabloid TMZ, remarked in the same interview that, when Kardashian accompanied Hilton to nightclub Hyde, which was a Hollywood hotspot at the time, he continued to get assignments from tabloids to get photographs of Kardashian for the next three years. In 2021, Kardashian said that Hilton "literally gave me a career. And I totally acknowledge that."

=== Breakthrough (2007–2010) ===
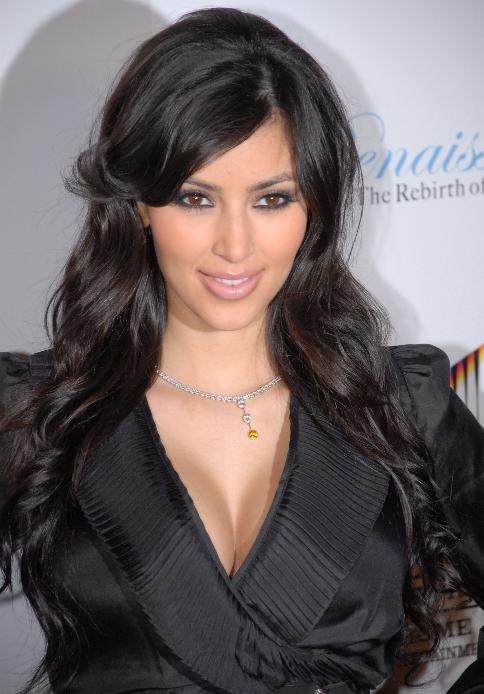
Kardashian at the Seventh Annual Hollywood Life Magazine Awards in 2007

In February 2007, a sex tape made by Kardashian and singer Ray J in 2003 was leaked on the internet and gained national attention. Kardashian filed a lawsuit against Vivid Entertainment for distributing the film as Kim Kardashian, Superstar. She dropped the suit 3 months later and settled for a reported US$5 million, giving Vivid permission to market and sell copies of the tape. Sales from the film reportedly generated nearly US$1.5 million in revenue in the first six weeks. Several media outlets later criticized her and her family for using the sex tape's release as a publicity stunt to promote their forthcoming reality show.

In October 2007, Kardashian and her mother Kris Jenner, her step-parent Caitlyn Jenner (then Bruce Jenner), her siblings Kourtney, Khloé, and Rob Kardashian, and half-sisters Kendall and Kylie Jenner, began to appear in the reality television series Keeping Up with the Kardashians. The series proved successful for E!, and led to the creation of a number of spin-offs, including Kourtney and Kim Take New York and Kourtney and Kim Take Miami. The flagship series concluded in June 2021 after 294 episodes.

Kardashian posed in a nude pictorial for the December 2007 issue of Playboy, and appeared on the cover of the November 2010 issue of Romanian Playboy, promoting a pictorial titled "Poezia Unui Fund Bombat" (The Poetry of a Bulging Ass). In 2008, Kardashian made her feature film debut in the disaster film spoof Disaster Movie, in which she appeared as a character named Lisa. The same year, she was a participant on season seven of Dancing with the Stars, where she was partnered with Mark Ballas. She was the third contestant to be eliminated. In 2009, Kardashian posed for the cover of Maxim for the magazines April/May issue. In September 2009, Fusion Beauty and Seven Bar Foundation launched "Kiss Away Poverty", with Kardashian as the face of the campaign. For each LipFusion lipgloss sold, US$1 went to the Foundation to fund female entrepreneurs in the United States. In October, she launched her first fragrance, self-titled "Kim Kardashian". That year, she also released a workout DVD series, became a guest host–judge of WrestleMania XXIV on America's Next Top Model, and guest-starred in How I Met Your Mother, Beyond the Break, and CBS's CSI: NY.

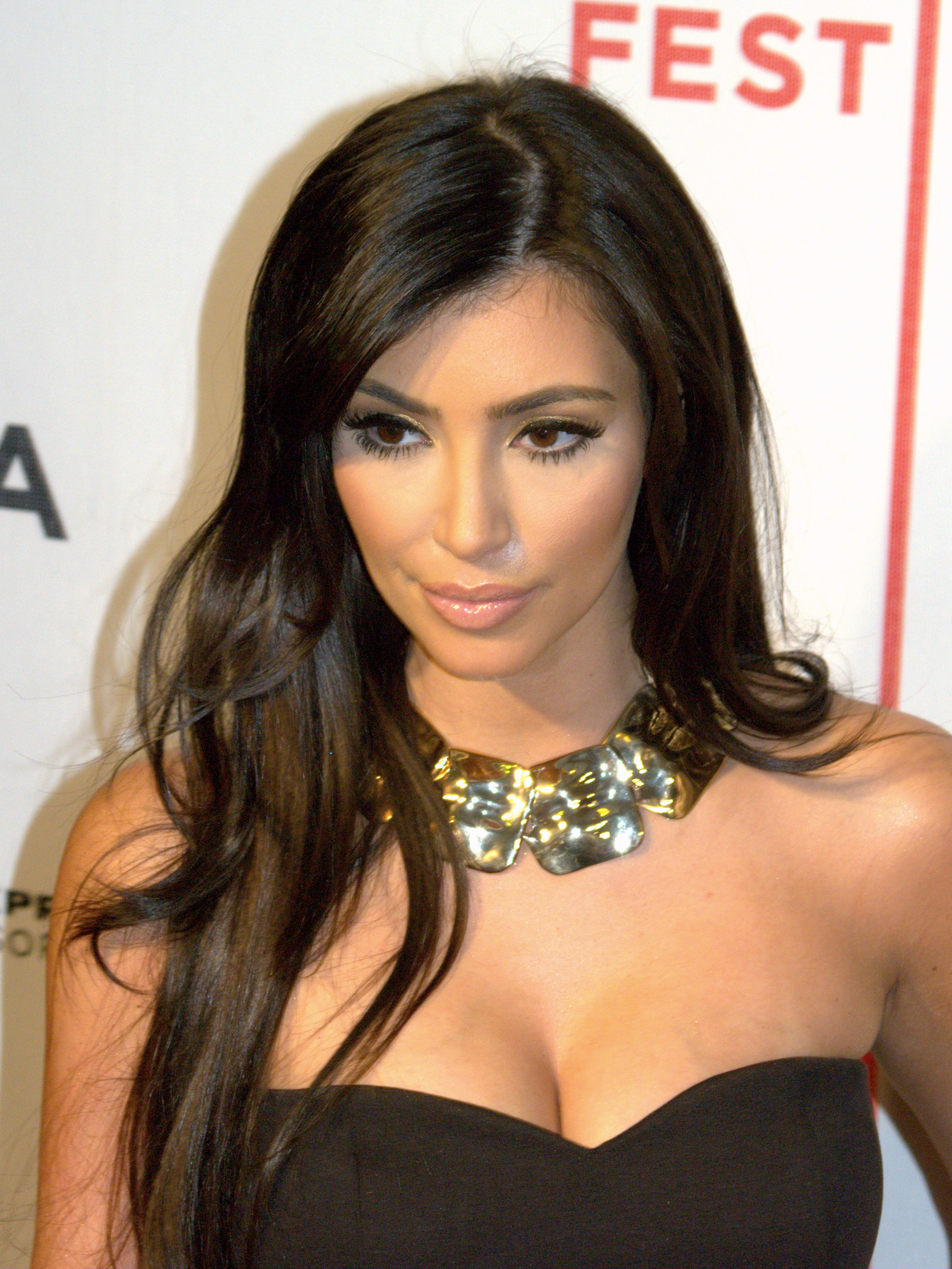
Kardashian at the Tribeca Film Festival in 2009

By 2010, Kardashian had ventured into several new endorsement deals, including endorsing various food products for Carl's Jr. On July 1, 2010, the New York City branch of Madame Tussauds revealed a wax figure of Kardashian. Kim, Kourtney, and Khloé wrote an autobiography titled Kardashian Konfidential, which was released in stores on November 23, 2010, and appeared on New York Times Best Seller List. Kardashian also served as producer for The Spin Crowd, a reality television show about a New York City public relations firm run by Jonathan Cheban and Simon Huck, appeared on season ten of The Apprentice, and guest starred with Khloé and Kourtney as themselves on the season three premiere episode of the series 90210.

In December 2010, Kardashian worked with The Dream and Tricky Stewart to produce her first musical single "Jam (Turn It Up)". The music video was directed by Hype Williams; Kanye West makes a cameo in the video. Kardashian premiered the song during a New Year's Eve party at TAO Las Vegas on December 31, 2010. When asked if an album was in the works, Kardashian replied, "There's no album in the works or anything—just one song we did for Kourtney and Kim Take New York, and a video Hype Williams directed, half of the proceeds we're giving away to a cancer foundation, because The-Dream's and one of my parents passed away from cancer. It's just all having fun—with a good cause". Jim Farber, writing for the Daily News, called the song a "dead-brained piece of generic dance music, without a single distinguishing feature", and suggested that the single made Kardashian the "worst singer in the reality TV universe".

=== Business ventures (2011–2016) ===
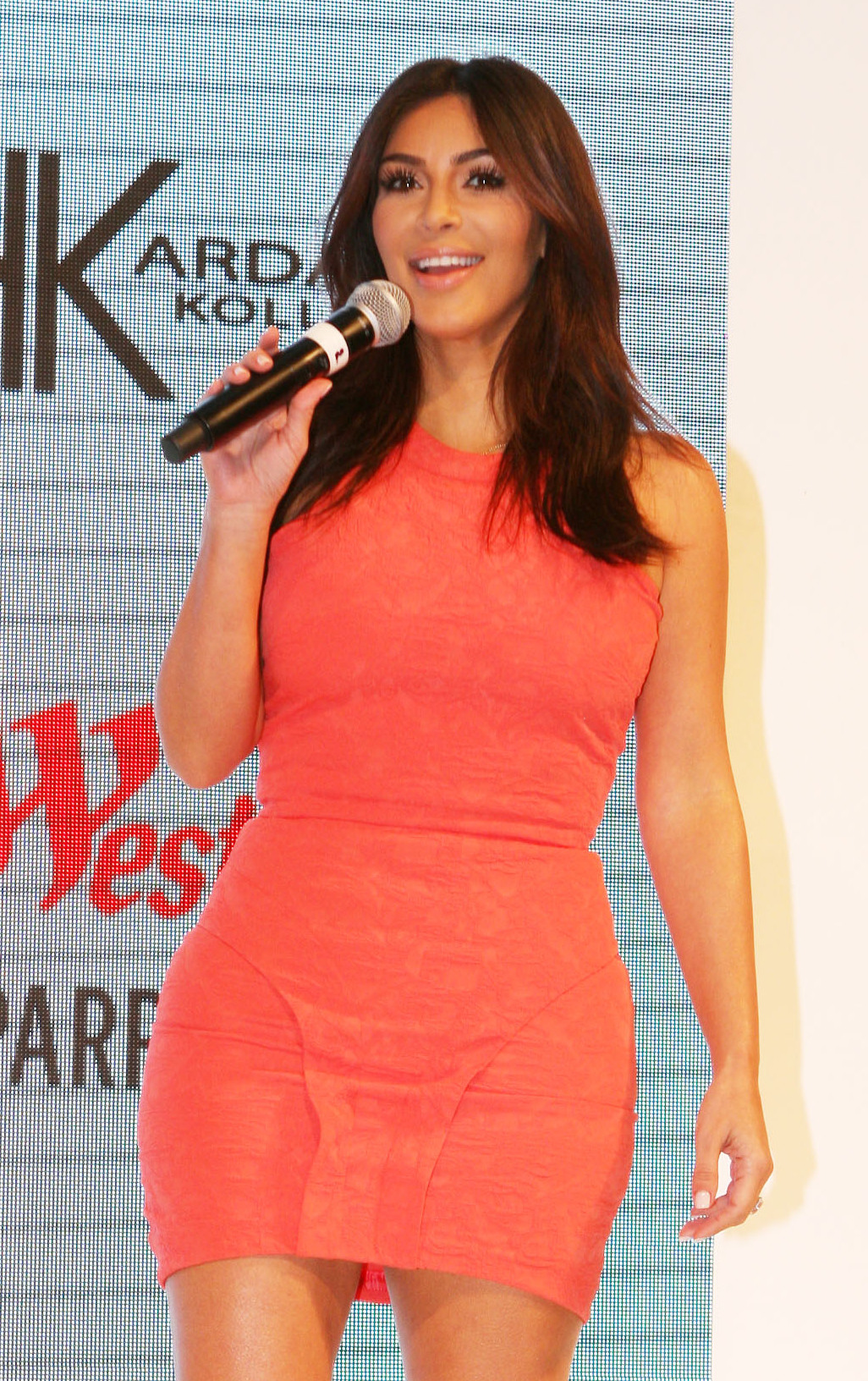
Kardashian introducing the Kardashian Kollection in Sydney, Australia, in September 2014

In 2011, the Kardashian sisters partnered with department store Sears to launch the Kardashian Kollection. The line launched in September in 700 Sears locations and consisted of apparel, accessories, footwear, jewelry, and lingerie. The sisters would only receive a split 6% of the lines proceeds despite sales of $600 million in 2013. Sears confirmed the lines discontinuance in May 2015. Kardashian would release her third fragrance, "Gold", in September 2011 as well as a novel, Dollhouse, along with sisters Kourtney and Khloé in November. In 2012, E! renewed Keeping Up with the Kardashians for two additional seasons, in a deal reported to be worth $50 million. That year, Kardashian released her fourth fragrance, "True Reflection", which she worked with the company Dress for Success to promote, and her fifth fragrance, "Glam", which was made available through Debenhams. In Temptation: Confessions of a Marriage Counselor (2013), a romantic drama produced, written, and directed by Tyler Perry, Kardashian obtained the role of the co-worker of an ambitious therapist. While the film was a moderate box office success, with a worldwide gross of US$53.1 million, critical response was negative and Kardashian won the Razzie Award for Worst Supporting Actress.

Kardashian released Kim Kardashian: Hollywood, a mobile game for iPhone and Android, in June 2014. The objective of the game is to become a Hollywood star or starlet. The game supports a free-to-play model, meaning the game is free to download, but charges for in-game items. It was a hit, earning US$1.6 million in its first five days of release. In July, developer Glu Mobile announced that the game was the fifth highest earning game in Apple's App Store. She voiced an alien in the September 21, 2014, episode of the adult animated series American Dad!.

Kardashian appeared on the cover and in a pictorial in Paper's winter 2014 issue, photographed by Jean-Paul Goude. On the cover, her nude buttocks are featured above the caption: "Break the Internet", which generated considerable comment in both social and traditional media. A Time magazine writer commented that, unlike previous celebrities' nudes that represented the women's rebellion against repressed society and "trying to tear down" barriers, Kardashian's exhibition was "just provocation and bluster, repeated images that seem to offer us some sort of truth or insight but are really just self serving. We want there to be something more, some reason or context, some great explanation that tells us what it is like to live in this very day and age, but there is not. Kim Kardashian's ass is nothing but an empty promise." However, the stunt "set a new benchmark" in social media response, and Paper's website received 15.9 million views in one day, compared with 25,000 views on an average day.

Kardashian released a portfolio book called Selfish, a 325-page collection of self-taken photos of herself, in May 2015. It received positive reviews from critics, with Kat Brown of The Telegraph describing it as "unexpectedly revealing" and "oddly moving". That year, she was also the cover model for the August issue of Vogue Spain, and released an emoji pack for iOS devices called Kimoji. The app was a best-seller, becoming one of the top 5 most bought apps in its first week of release.

By November 2016, as per CBC Marketplace and interviews with celebrity endorsement experts, Kardashian was reportedly paid at least US$300,000 for each post that she made on Instagram, Facebook and Twitter, endorsing beauty products like waist trainers, teeth whiteners as well as Coca-Cola and well-known charities. Business Insider later estimated her fee to be around US$720,000 per Instagram post. Even though engagement data indicates that her posts are worth slightly less, her regular features in the news allow her to demand a premium above any calculated Instagram sponsored post price.

=== KKW Beauty, KKW Fragrances, and Skims (2017–2019) ===
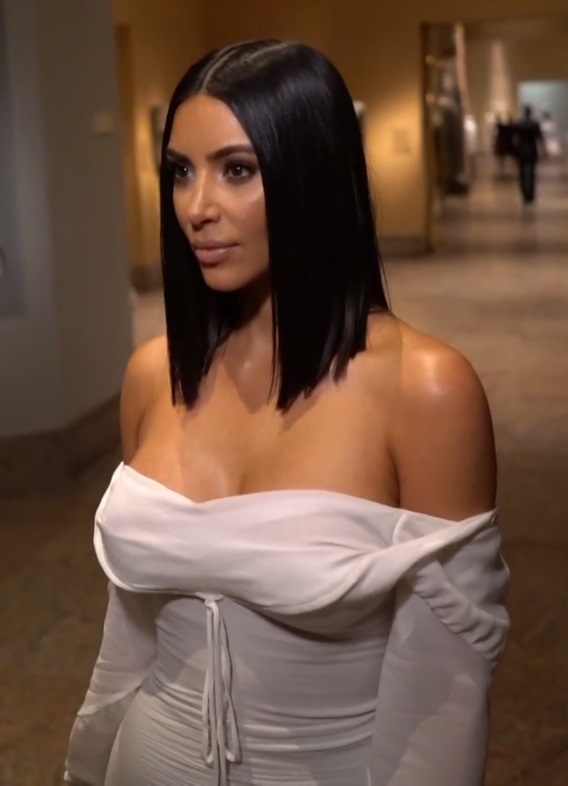
Kardashian at the Met Gala in 2017

In 2017, Kardashian and then-husband Kanye West launched their online children's clothing line, Kids Supply, in May. After a 20% off site-wide sale in July 2018, the line was discontinued sometime after. Kardashian launched both her beauty and fragrance lines, KKW Beauty and KKW Fragrance, in June and November 2017, respectively. Kardashian and Laverne Cox co-executive produced the Lifetime reality competition series, Glam Masters, which premiered in February 2018. The eight-episode series revolved around aspiring beauty bloggers who competed for the title of "Glam Master"; prizes for the winner included collaborating with Kardashian on a makeup line for KKW Beauty and the opportunity to join her "glam squad". Kardashian and the series' winner, Argenis Pinal teamed up on an eyeshadow sticks line for KKW Beauty, named "Créme Color Sticks". She made a cameo appearance in the heist film Ocean's 8, which was released on June 8, 2018. Kardashian's next project was the hidden camera-prank reality series, You Kiddin' Me. Co-executive produced by Kardashian and Lionsgate Television, the web series premiered on Facebook Watch in September 2018. She appeared alongside her sisters and mother Kris Jenner in the premiere episode of the series. In November, Kardashian and Kris appeared in the NBC special, A Legendary Christmas with John and Chrissy.

In May 2019, Kardashian appeared in the music video for DJ duo Dimitri Vegas & Like Mike and Paris Hilton's single, "B.F.A. (Best Friend's Ass)". After announcing a new range of shapewear called Kimono in June, Kardashian was heavily criticized over the name of the brand, which critics argued disrespected Japanese culture and ignored the significance behind the traditional outfit. Following the launch of the range, the hashtag #KimOhNo began trending on Twitter and the mayor of Kyoto wrote to Kardashian to ask her to reconsider the trademark on Kimono. In response to public pressure, she announced that she would change the name. However, Japanese trade minister Hiroshige Seko stated that he would still be dispatching patent officials for a meeting at the U.S. Patent and Trademark Office, and that Japan would keep an eye on the situation. In August 2019, she rebranded the shapewear company to the name "Skims". Co-founded by Kardashian, Swedish entrepreneur Jens Grede, and British businesswoman Emma Grede, Skims launched the following month as a DTC operation via its webstore and shortly after, was made available via multiple retail websites. The brand has been recognized and praised for its inclusive sizing and apparel shades; its celebrity branding—including musicians, actors, and athletes—has received significant media attention and achieved prominence in popular culture. Since its launch, Skims has expanded to a variety of loungewear, swimwear, activewear, women's apparel, menswear, and unisex clothing.

In February 2020, the brand entered its first retail partnership with luxury store chain Nordstrom. Starting in 2021, it has opened various pop-up stores in the United States, Europe and Asia. Beginning in 2024, Skims has opened several retail stores across the US and the UK, with 22 outlets in the former. Under a deal, it provided Team USA-branded athleisure to the US Olympics team's female athletes at the 2020 Summer Olympics and Paralympics. This partnership continued with multiple iterations of the Winter Olympics, the Summer Olympics, and the Paralympics throughout the 2020s decade. 2022 Winter Olympics, the 2024 Summer Olympics and Paralympics, and the 2026 Winter Olympics and four capsule collections released in collaboration with the US Winter and Summer Olympics delegations. Skims has released collaborations with various brands and fashion houses including Fendi, Dolce & Gabbana, Roberto Cavalli, Swarovski, and The North Face. In 2023, it entered a multiyear partnership as the official underwear partner of the NBA, WNBA, and USA Basketball. In 2025, the company and Nike introduced an activewear brand named NikeSkims—a joint operation. For her work on Skims, Kardashian received the Brand Innovator award at the 2021 WSJ. Innovator Awards and the Innovation Award at the 2023 CFDA Awards. The company appeared in Time's list of 100 Most Influential Companies of 2022, and as of November 2025, is valued at US$5 billion. As of 2024, Skims has generated "around $1 billion" in net sales.

=== The Kardashians and acting presence (2020–present) ===
On April 5, 2020, the documentary Kim Kardashian West: The Justice Project premiered on Oxygen, starring and executive produced by Kardashian. It follows her journey advocating for criminal justice reform and highlights mass incarceration in the US. In September, she made a cameo appearance in the YouTube Originals documentary, This is Paris. In December 2020, it was announced that Kim, the Kardashian–Jenner sisters, and their mother Kris Jenner had signed a multi-year exclusive global content deal with Disney-owned Hulu. A reality television series titled The Kardashians premiered in April 2022, co-produced by the sisters and Kris with British production company Fulwell 73. Described as a "premium version" of Keeping Up with the Kardashians, the program had the most-watched series premiere for Hulu in its first three days in the US, and was the most-watched Star Originals series on Disney+ and Star+ across global markets. As of November 2023, it is the most watched unscripted series in Hulu history.

Kardashian appeared in the Van Jones–led documentary, The First Step, which focuses on criminal justice reform; it premiered at the Tribeca Film Festival in June 2021. In July and August, she appeared in the premiere episodes of Martha Stewart's reality series, Martha Gets Down and Dirty; and Paris Hilton's cooking show Cooking with Paris, on Discovery+ and Netflix. Kardashian voiced Delores, a poodle, in the Canadian animated film PAW Patrol: The Movie, released on August 20, 2021. Courtney Howard of Variety stated that Kardashian and the supporting cast handled the film's "sillier moments". She reprised her voice role in the film's sequel, PAW Patrol: The Mighty Movie, released on September 29, 2023. In October 2021, Kardashian hosted Saturday Night Live and in her monologue, she made fun of her estranged-husband Kanye West, her mother's ex-husband Caitlyn Jenner, her sisters, O. J. Simpson, and many others.

In January 2022, in a class-action lawsuit filed against the cryptocurrency company EthereumMax that alleged the company is a pump and dump scheme, Kardashian was named as a defendant, along with former professional boxer Floyd Mayweather Jr., former NBA player Paul Pierce, and other celebrities, for promoting the EthereumMax token on their various social media accounts. In October 2022, the U.S. Securities and Exchange Commission announced that Kardashian had agreed to pay a $1.26 million fine, to not promote cryptocurrency assets for three years, and to cooperate with an ongoing investigation without admitting or denying wrongdoing for failing to report receiving a $250,000 payment to promote the EthereumMax token. In December 2022, Central California U.S. District Court Judge Michael W. Fitzgerald dismissed the lawsuit on the basis that the claims were insufficiently supported given heightened pleading standards for fraud.

In April 2022, Kardashian founded Skky Partners, a private equity firm, with a former partner of the Carlyle Group. Her mother, Kris Jenner, is also a partner at the firm. In December 2024, Kardashian stepped down as a managing partner and took on the role of senior operating advisor, whilst Jenner exited the firm. In July 2022, she made her Paris Fashion Week modeling debut on the catwalk for fashion house Balenciaga. The following month, Kardashian and Beats Electronics launched a collaborative range of true wireless earbuds in an earth tone palette inspired by her "signature minimalist style". In September, Dolce & Gabbana debuted its spring-summer 2023 collection, which Kardashian creative directed—taking after the fashion house's archive "with a retrospective of [the years 1987–2007]"—by leaning into an alter ego of "a sensual Italian mob wife". Under an exclusive deal with Spotify, she hosted and co-produced the eight-episode podcast The System: The Case of Kevin Keith with network Parcast. Premiering in October 2022, it outlines the discrepancies of Keith's case, in which he was convicted of triple homicide in 1994 in Ohio.

Kardashian co-led the twelfth season of American Horror Story, subtitled Delicate, alongside Emma Roberts. Her first scripted television role, she played Siobhan Corbyn, the protagonist's best friend and publicist. The season is based on Danielle Valentine's novel Delicate Condition; it was divided into two parts, which premiered in September 2023 and April 2024 on FX. Production for the season temporarily halted due to the 2023 Hollywood strikes. Kardashian's performance received positive reviews from critics. Anthony D'Alessandro of Deadline Hollywood called her "perfect" for the role of Siobhan Corbyn; whilst Coleman Spilde of The Daily Beast found Kardashian to be "the best part" of the season. In August 2024, Kardashian signed a first-look TV deal with 20th Television to develop and produce scripted programming content. The first project under this deal is the series Group Chat, based on La La Anthony's 2014 book The Love Playbook: Rules for Love, Sex and Happiness. Intended for Hulu, Kardashian will executive produce the series alongside Kenya Barris and Anthony, the latter who will star in the project. She again collaborated with Beats Electronics to release the "Beats x Kim" collection, a trio of Beats Studio Pro headphones in nude tones. On December 23, 2024, Kardashian released a cover version of "Santa Baby", produced by her brother-in-law Travis Barker, the husband of her sister Kourtney. Her first new music release since her 2011 debut single "Jam (Turn It Up)", its accompanying music video featured a cameo appearance by Macaulay Culkin.

Kardashian co-executive produced and led the legal drama series, All's Fair, created by Ryan Murphy; it premiered on November 4, 2025, on Hulu in the US and Disney+ elsewhere. She starred as Allura Grant, a divorce attorney and owner of an all-female law firm, alongside Naomi Watts, Niecy Nash-Betts, Teyana Taylor, Sarah Paulson, and Glenn Close. The series received overwhelmingly negative reviews from critics. Angie Han of The Hollywood Reporter wrote that the series was "brain dead" and described Kardashian's performance as "stiff and affectless without a single authentic note" while Ed Power of The Telegraph called the program "a crime against television". All's Fair had the most-watched scripted Hulu series premiere of the past three years prior to its debut. It was renewed for a second season. In December 2025, Kardashian and battle royale game Fortnite launched her in-game bundle of cosmetics and outfits ("skins") as part of its Icon Series.

Kardashian will co-produce and star in the eponymous role—among a female ensemble cast—in the Netflix comedy film The Fifth Wheel, directed by Eva Longoria and written by Paula Pell and Janine Brito. She has committed to co-produce and star in an untitled Amazon MGM Studios thriller movie written by Natalie Krinsky "with [her] in mind". Kardashian will also co-produce Amazon MGM's untitled live-action Bratz film; she is in talks to play the film's antagonist, as of June 2025.

== Public image ==
=== Reception ===
Since rising to prominence in the late 2000s, Kardashian has remained a highly polarizing public figure. While critics have often dismissed her as being "famous for being famous", others have credited her with reshaping the nature of modern celebrity and the influence of reality television and social media on fame.

In 2010, Barbara Walters included her in her annual special of the "10 Most Fascinating People". A 2011 Nielsen poll ranked her among the most searched-for personalities on the Internet. In 2015, Time included her on its list of the 100 most influential people in the world, while Forbes has featured her multiple times in its Celebrity 100 list, citing her earnings from television, endorsements, and businesses. She ranked 17th, 13th, and 10th in FHM's 100 Sexiest Women poll in 2008, 2015, and 2016, respectively.

Despite this recognition, she has also faced criticism. A 2012 British survey named her among the "most annoying celebrities", while cultural commentators have accused her of promoting materialism and unrealistic beauty standards.

=== Persona ===
Kardashian in 2011

Much of Kardashian's public persona has been linked to her image as a glamorous socialite, fashion icon, and entrepreneur. She has often been described as embodying the archetype of the "celebutante", a celebrity known primarily for lifestyle, appearances, and media ubiquity rather than artistic output.

Her image has been shaped around carefully curated aesthetics: bodycon dresses, contour makeup, high-fashion collaborations, and viral photoshoots, such as her 2014 nude Paper magazine cover, which popularized the phrase "break the internet".

Writers have noted that Kardashian has used her reality show persona—at times perceived as vain or superficial—to build a multifaceted brand spanning cosmetics, shapewear, mobile apps, and fragrances.

=== Media presence ===
Kardashian has consistently been a fixture of global media since the 2007 debut of Keeping Up with the Kardashians. Tabloids, entertainment outlets, and online platforms have documented her relationships, fashion, and personal life, making her one of the most photographed women of the 21st century.

By the mid-2010s, she was one of the most followed personalities on Instagram, with over 350 million followers as of 2025. Her online visibility has fueled the rise of influencer culture, with commentators crediting her for transforming how celebrities monetize fame.

Throughout her career, Kardashian has appeared on the covers of numerous international magazines, including Vogue, Harper's Bazaar, Elle, GQ, Cosmopolitan, Adweek, C Magazine, and Paper in the United States; Glamour, and ES Magazine in the United Kingdom; Vogue in France, Italy, Turkey, and India; Vanity Fair in Spain; L'Officiel in Germany; Remix in New Zealand; and The New York Times Style Magazine in Singapore.

== Personal life ==
=== Relationships ===
In 2000, at 19 years old, Kardashian eloped with music producer Damon Thomas. Thomas filed for divorce in 2003. Kardashian later blamed their separation on physical and emotional abuse on his part and said she was high on ecstasy during their wedding ceremony. Before her divorce was finalized, Kardashian began dating singer Ray J.

Kardashian then dated Reggie Bush. Their relationship began after Matt Leinart introduced them at the 2007 ESPY Awards. They split on July 27, 2009 and got back together on September 28, 2009. Kardashian also briefly dated NFL player Miles Austin in 2010.

In May 2011, Kardashian became engaged to NBA player Kris Humphries, then of the New Jersey Nets, whom she had been dating since October 2010. They were married in a wedding ceremony on August 20 in Montecito, California. Earlier that month, she had released her "wedding fragrance" called "Kim Kardashian Love" which coincided with her own wedding. A two-part TV special showing the preparations and the wedding itself aired on E! in early October 2011, amidst what The Washington Post called a "media blitz" related to the wedding. After 72 days of marriage, she filed for divorce from Humphries on October 31, citing irreconcilable differences. Several news outlets surmised that Kardashian's marriage to Humphries was merely a publicity stunt to promote the Kardashian family's brand and their subsequent television ventures. A man professing to be her former publicist, Jonathan Jaxson, also claimed that her short-lived marriage was indeed staged and a ploy to generate money. Kardashian filed a suit against Jaxson, saying his claims were untrue, and later settled the case that included an apology from Jaxson. A widely circulated petition asking to remove all Kardashian-related programming from the air followed the split. The divorce was subject to widespread media attention.

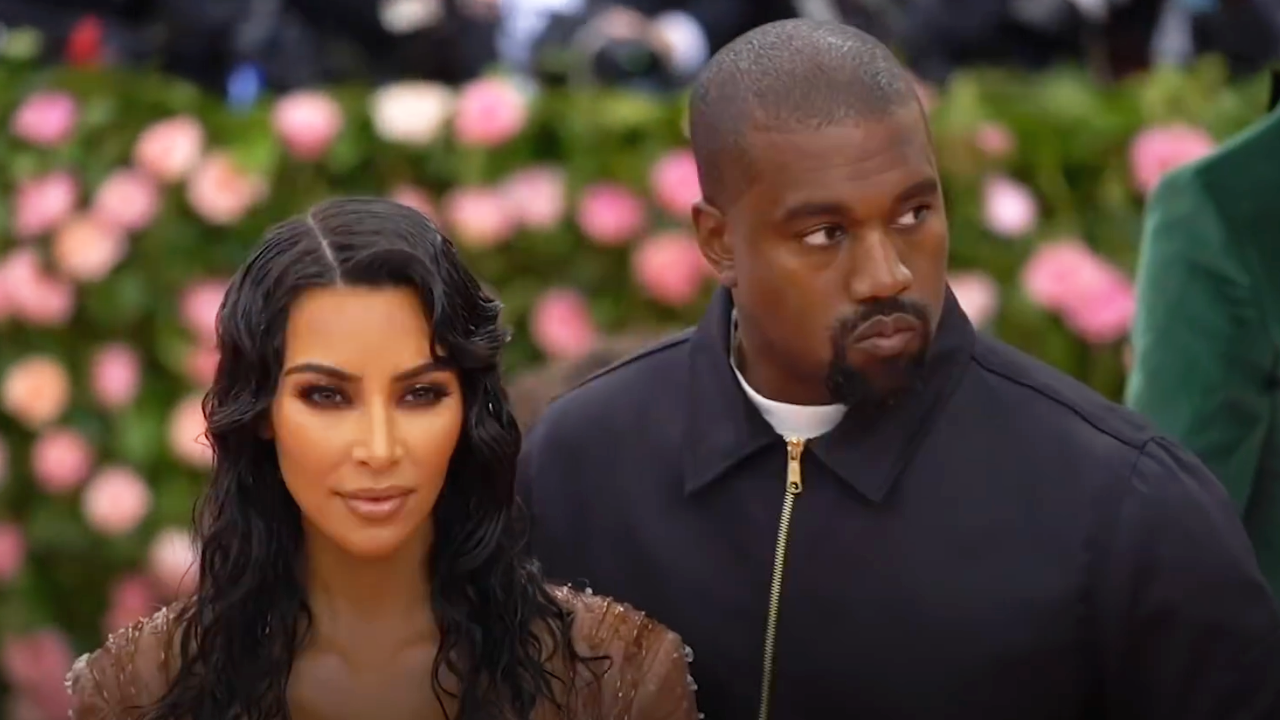
Kardashian with then-husband Kanye West at the Met Gala in 2019

Kardashian began dating rapper and longtime friend Kanye West in April 2012, while still legally married to Humphries. Her divorce was finalized on June 3, 2013, Kardashian and West became engaged on October 21, Kardashian's 33rd birthday, and married on May 24, 2014, at Forte di Belvedere in Florence, Italy. Her wedding dress was designed by Riccardo Tisci of Givenchy with some guests' dresses designed by designer Michael Costello. The couple's high status and respective careers have resulted in their relationship becoming subject to heavy media coverage; The New York Times referred to their marriage as "a historic blizzard of celebrity". West said Kardashian was his muse.

In January 2021, CNN reported that the couple were discussing divorce and on February 19, 2021, Kardashian officially filed for divorce. In April 2021, they both agreed before court that they would end their marriage due to "irreconcilable differences" and agreed to joint custody of their four children. They also agreed that neither of them need spousal support. In February 2022, Kardashian filed a complaint to the Los Angeles Superior Court, asking for a quicker proceedings in the divorce from West, saying that West was trying to delay it and saying that "Mr. West, by his actions, has made it clear that he does not accept that the parties' marital relationship is over." Kardashian was declared legally single on March 2, 2022. She subsequently dropped "West" as her legal last name and ended their marriage. A post-divorce settlement was reached on November 29, 2022.

Kardashian was in a relationship with actor and comedian Pete Davidson from November 2021 to August 2022. From September 2023 to March 2024, Kardashian was reportedly in a relationship with NFL wide receiver Odell Beckham Jr.

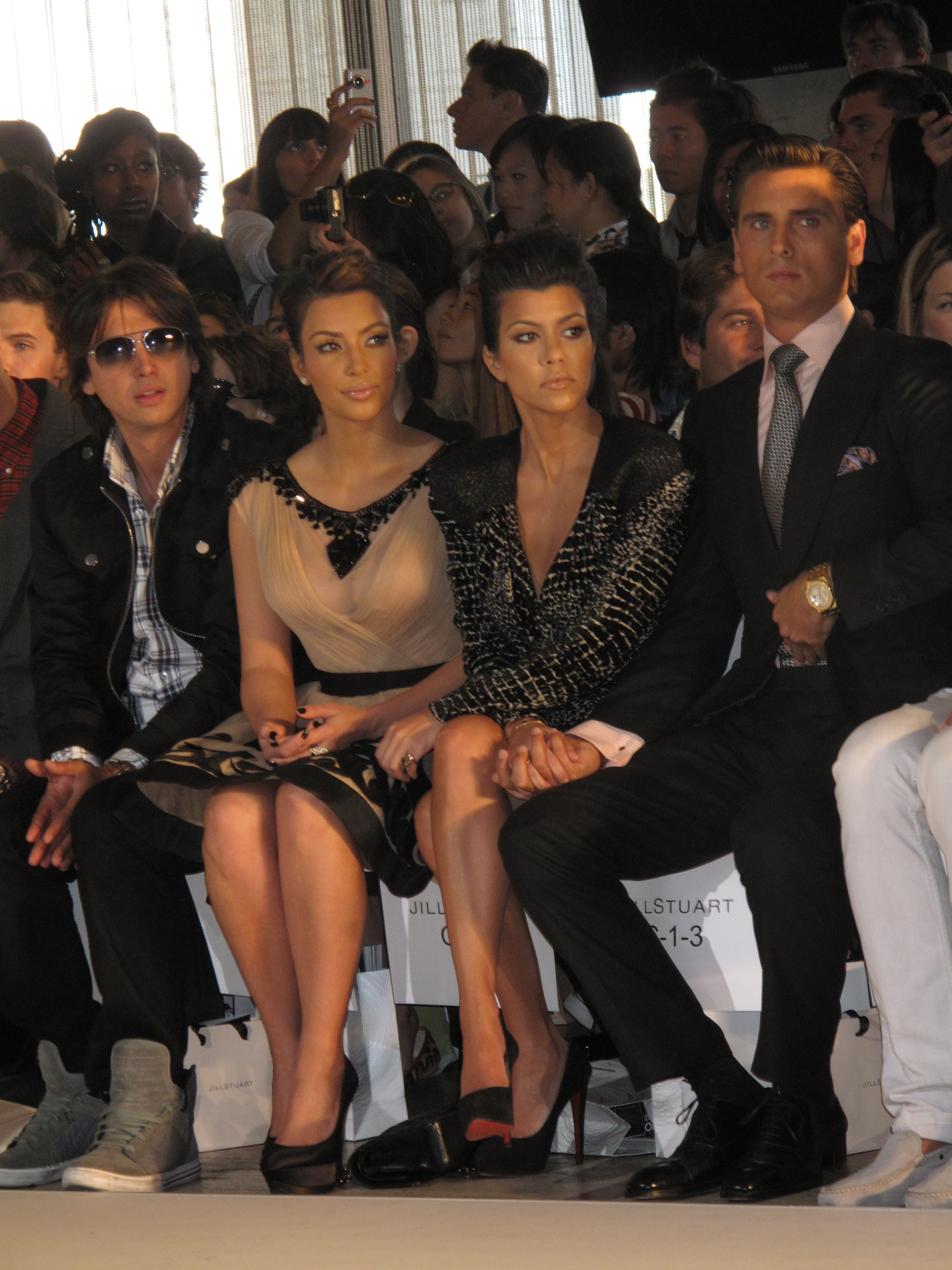
At the Mercedes-Benz Fashion Week 2010. Left to right: fellow cast member Jonathan Cheban, Kim Kardashian, sister Kourtney, and Scott Disick (Kourtney's then partner)

Since 2026, she has been in a relationship with British Formula One driver Lewis Hamilton.

=== Religion ===
Kim Kardashian is a Christian and has described herself as "really religious". She was educated in Christian schools of both the Presbyterian and Roman Catholic traditions.

In April 2015, Kardashian and West traveled to the Armenian Quarter of the Old City in Jerusalem to have their daughter baptized in the Armenian Apostolic Church, one of the oldest jurisdictions of Oriental Orthodox Christianity. The ceremony took place at the Cathedral of St. James. Khloé Kardashian was appointed as the godmother. In October 2019, Kardashian and her three younger children were baptized at the baptistery in the Etchmiadzin Cathedral complex, Armenia's mother church. Kardashian was given the Armenian name Heghine (Հեղինէ) at her baptism.

=== Health and pregnancies ===
Kardashian has four children with Kanye West: two daughters (born 2013 and 2018) and two sons (born 2015 and 2019).

Kardashian has publicly discussed difficulties during her first two pregnancies. She experienced pre-eclampsia during her first, which forced her to deliver at 34 weeks. With both pregnancies, she developed placenta accreta after delivery, eventually undergoing surgery to remove the placenta and scar tissue. After her second pregnancy, doctors advised her not to become pregnant again; her third and fourth children were born via surrogacy.

Kardashian has also spoken about her psoriasis. In May 2021, it was reported that Kardashian had tested positive for COVID-19 in November 2020. She confirmed this report but denied reports that she caught the disease after hosting a party at a private island.

In October 2025, Kardashian revealed that she received a brain aneurysm diagnosis and suggested the condition was due to the ongoing stress in dealing with splitting from West.

=== Wealth ===
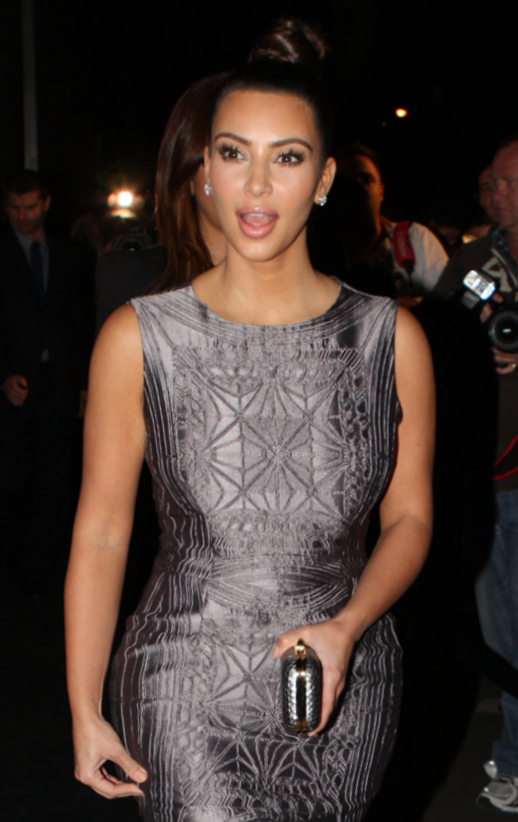
Kardashian in Australia for an E! News event in 2012

In May 2014, Kardashian was estimated to be worth US$45 million. In 2015, Forbes reported she had "made more this year than ever as her earnings nearly doubled to $53 million from 2014's $28 million", and reported that she "has monetized fame better than any other". Much of her income in the early-to-mid 2010s included wholesale earnings of the Sears line, the Kardashian Kollection, which brought in $600 million in 2013 and the Kardashian Beauty cosmetics line, Kardashian-branded tanning products, the boutique-line Dash, as well as sponsored social media posts which are collectively worth $300,000–500,000 per post. As of July 2018, Kardashian was worth US$350 million. She does not receive alimony payments from either of her first two marriages. Kardashian became a billionaire in April 2021 thanks to her shapewear company Skims, KKW Beauty, reality television, endorsements, and investments. Forbes has estimated her net worth at $1.7 billion as of December 2024, making her one of the world's wealthiest celebrities.

Kardashian has been included in the Forbes Celebrity 100 multiple times, which ranks the highest-earning celebrities annually. She first appeared on the list in 2012 as the seventh-highest-paid celebrity that year, with earnings of $18 million. In 2016, Kardashian was the 42nd-highest-paid celebrity with $51 million; 40 percent of her earnings that year were from her mobile game Kim Kardashian: Hollywood. In 2017, 2018, and 2019, she was ranked number 47, 30, and 26 with $45.5 million, $67 million, and $72 million; the last of which is her highest reported annual earnings. She was ranked the 48th-highest-paid celebrity of 2020, with $49.5 million in earnings, majorly from her cosmetics line KKW Beauty, which generated $100 million in sales the previous year. Kardashian is among the ten highest-paid individuals on Instagram. As of 2023, she earns over $1.68 million per sponsored Instagram post. She was the twelfth-highest-paid celebrity on Instagram in 2024, with earnings of over $4.37 million across sponsored posts.

=== Legal controversy ===
After working as a stylist for Brandi Norwood, Norwood's mother (and manager) Sonja Norwood, alleged that in 2004 she had authorized Kardashian to make "one and only one" purchase on her American Express credit card and that nevertheless Kardashian and her sisters Khloé and Kourtney had incurred over $120,000 in unauthorized charges to that card. Norwood also alleged that the bulk of the charges were attributable to purchases made at Kardashian's family-owned boutique in 2006 and 2007, after Kardashian was no longer employed by Norwood's daughter. Norwood further alleged that, at the request of her children, she did not file criminal charges, instead presenting her allegations personally to Kardashian, and that Kardashian apologized and promised to repay the debt. In 2008, when no payments had been made, Norwood filed a lawsuit. Kardashian has denied all these allegations. In 2009, the parties reportedly reached a confidential settlement and the lawsuit was dismissed.

In 2011, Kardashian filed a $20 million lawsuit against clothing retailer Old Navy after it aired an advertisement starring Melissa Molinaro. Kardashian alleged that Old Navy had misappropriated her likeness by featuring Molinaro, who looks like Kardashian, in the advertisement. Kardashian and Gap, Old Navy's parent company, settled for an undisclosed amount by August 2012.

=== Paris robbery ===
On October 2, 2016, while attending Paris Fashion Week, Kardashian was robbed at gunpoint in the apartment where she was staying. Five individuals, dressed as police officers, bound and gagged her, then stole $10 million worth of jewelry. The thieves got in her residence by threatening the concierge. Once they accessed Kardashian's room, they held a gun to her head and ordered her to give them her ring, then bound her wrists and legs with zip ties and wrapped duct tape around her eyes and mouth. Kardashian, who was placed in the bathtub, was physically unharmed and reportedly begged for her life. She managed to wriggle her hands free from the zip ties on her wrists and scream for help. The thieves, after finding her jewelry box, promptly escaped. On October 6, 2016, it was revealed that filming for the next season of Keeping Up with the Kardashians had been placed "on hold indefinitely" after the robbery.

Following the robbery, Media Take Out published a series of stories alleging that the crime was staged; however, the website later removed these articles. On October 10, 2016, a video was released showing Kardashian immediately after the robbery, as police began conducting their investigation. In the video, she is seen using the cell phone that she had reported stolen, and did not have any of the markings she claimed from being bound by her captors, prompting more questions as to whether or not the events were staged. In response, Kardashian filed lawsuits against several media outlets the following day, and secured a gag order to get the video removed from any articles due to it being part of an active police investigation. On October 25, 2016, Kardashian dropped the lawsuit. Production resumed on Keeping Up with the Kardashians on October 26.

On January 9, 2017, French police detained 17 persons of interest for questioning in the robbery case. Later in 2017, 16 people were arrested for their alleged involvement. It was revealed in 2020 that French prosecutors would seek trial for 12 of the suspects. The suspects who allegedly entered her room were of, or near, senior age and were named the 'Grandpa Robbers' by the press.

The trial began in April 2025, with Kardashian giving evidence in person. Eight of the defendants were convicted and two were acquitted.

== Activism ==
During an interview with Caity Weaver of GQ for the July 2016 issue, Kardashian described herself as a Democrat, and declared her support for Hillary Clinton in the 2016 U.S. presidential election.

In January 2017, she tweeted a table of statistics that went viral, highlighting statistics that show that gun violence in the United States kills 11,737 people annually while terrorism in the United States kills 14 people annually. In December 2017, the tweet was mentioned by the Royal Statistical Society in the announcement of its "International Statistic of the Year" for 2017. On a trip to Uganda in October 2018, she and her husband met with President Yoweri Museveni. They had a press conference, and Kanye talked about tourism in Uganda. They were criticized for meeting Museveni due to his then-recent crackdown on the opposition and the Ugandan LGBT community.

In April 2019, Vogue reported that Kardashian was studying to pass the bar exam; instead of attending law school, she is reading law. In 2021, Kardashian said she had failed her first-year law exam (the baby bar) for a second time, performing "slightly worse" than her first attempt earlier in the year. In December 2021, she passed the "baby bar" law exam on her fourth attempt. She completed her law reader program in 2025, but in November 2025, announced she failed her first attempt at the bar exam.

In 2020, Kardashian condemned the actions of Azerbaijan in the 2020 Nagorno-Karabakh conflict, and expressed her support for Armenia and the Republic of Artsakh. On November 20, 2021, it was reported that Kardashian and the English soccer club Leeds United F.C., with the help of Rabbi Moshe Margertten of the Tzedek Association, had financially helped female Afghan soccer players to make their way safely to England. The women and girls had escaped Afghanistan following the Taliban takeover, but were stranded in Pakistan.

=== Armenian genocide recognition ===
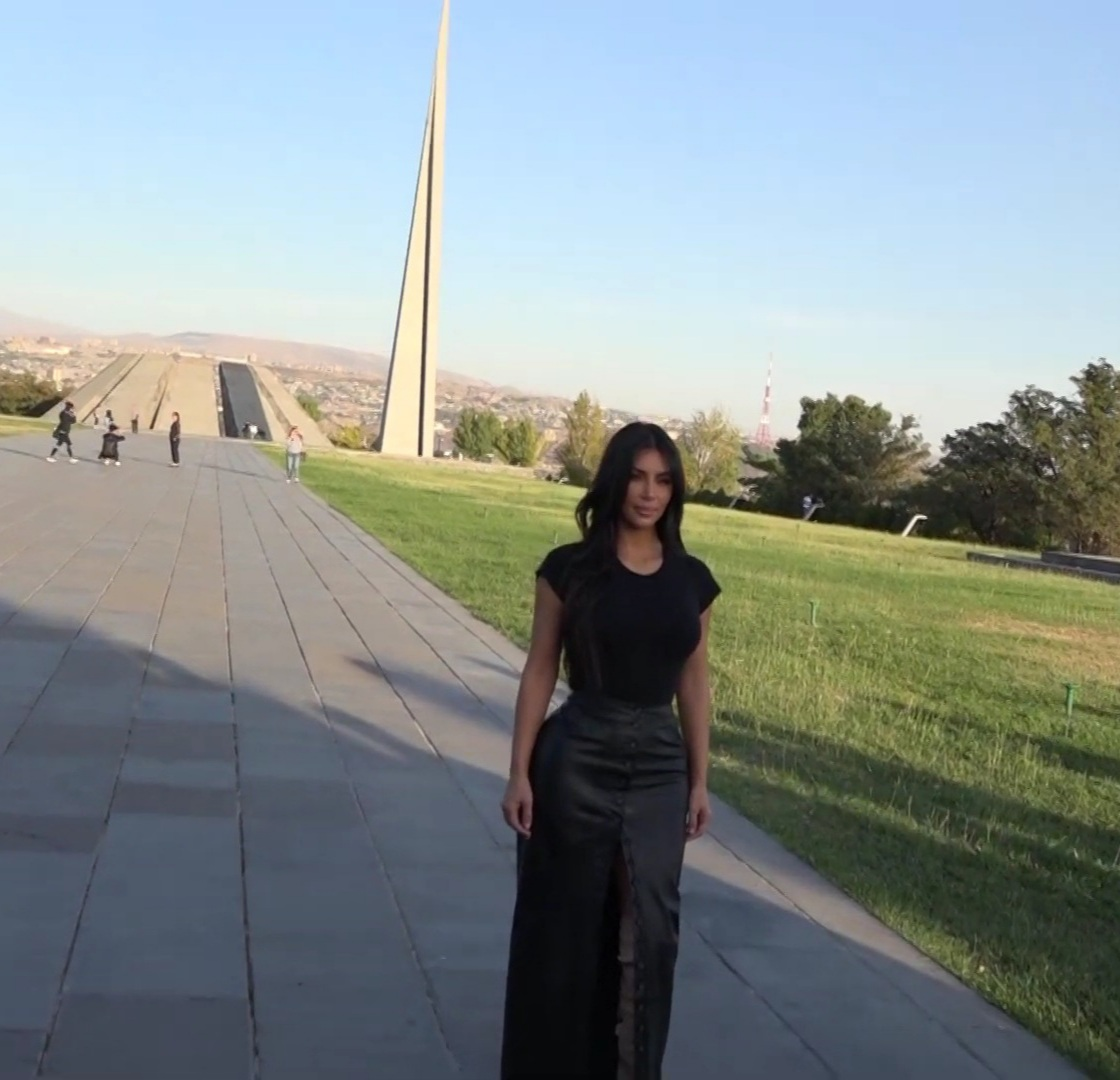
Kardashian at the Armenian genocide memorial in Yerevan, Armenia in October 2019

Kardashian has expressed pride in her Armenian and Scottish ancestry. She is not a citizen of either Armenia or the United Kingdom, and does not speak Armenian. She has advocated for the recognition of the Armenian genocide on numerous occasions and encouraged President Barack Obama and the United States government to consider its acknowledgement. In April 2016, Kardashian wrote an article on her website condemning The Wall Street Journal for running an advertisement by FactCheckArmenia.com denying the Armenian genocide. In April 2021, Kardashian wrote a letter to President Joe Biden thanking him for officially recognizing the Armenian genocide and becoming the first United States president ever to do so.

In April 2015, Kardashian traveled to Armenia with her husband, her sister Khloé, and her eldest daughter and visited the Armenian Genocide Memorial Tsitsernakaberd in Yerevan. On October 10, 2020, Kardashian announced she donated $1 million to Armenia Fund, a humanitarian organization that supports Armenia's development.

=== Prison reform and clemency advocacy ===
Kardashian has worked in the area of prison reform, advocating for the commutation of the sentence of Chris Young and also of Alice Marie Johnson, a woman who received a life sentence for a first-time drug offense as the leader of a major cocaine ring in Tennessee which was granted by President Donald Trump in June 2018. Along with Van Jones and Jared Kushner, she was instrumental in persuading President Trump to support the First Step Act, which enacted major reforms in the US prison system. Van Jones later stated that without Kardashian, the act would have never passed because it would not have received the president's support. It was later passed by a great majority in the US Senate.

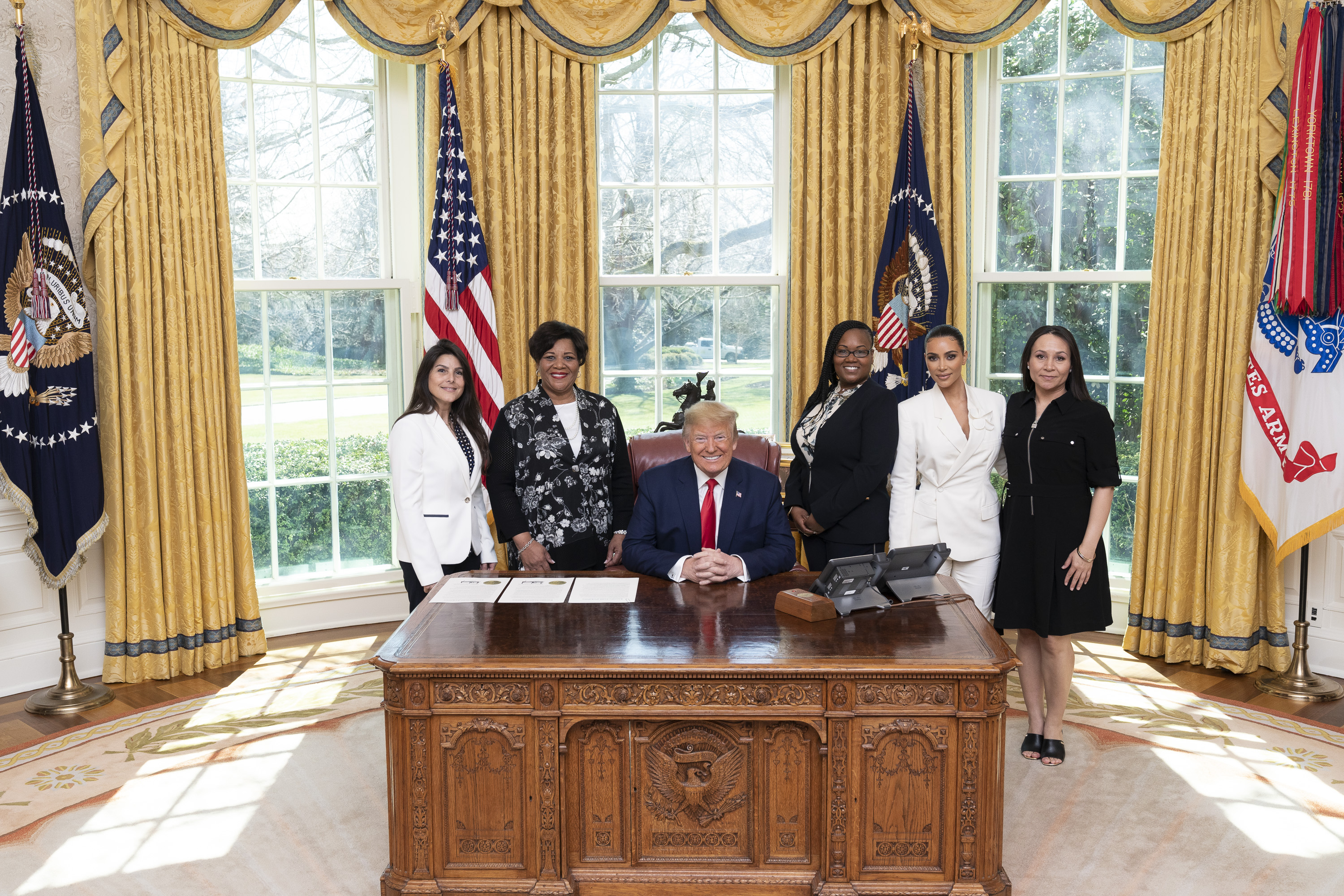
Kardashian (second from right) welcomes sentence commutation recipients with President Donald Trump, 2018

In 2019, Kardashian largely funded the 90 Days to Freedom campaign, an initiative to release nonviolent drug offenders from life sentences by attorneys Brittany K. Barnett and MiAngel Cody. The effort resulted in 17 persons being released under provisions of the First Step Act. Kardashian was widely credited for the success of the campaign in media headlines. Commentary on her involvement ranged from praise, to assertions that it was a public relations stunt, to accusations that she was taking the credit for work she did not do. In a Facebook post from May 7 of that year, Barnett commented on the divisive and underfunded nature of the "criminal justice reform space", adding, "Kim linked arms with us to support us when foundations turned us down. We and our clients and their families have a lot of love for her and are deeply grateful for her."

In April 2022, Kardashian advocated for the clemency of Melissa Lucio, the only woman of Hispanic descent on Texas' death row, in a series of tweets. She tweeted, "I recently just read about the case of Melissa Lucio and wanted to share her story with you. She has been on death row for over 14 years for her daughter's death that was a tragic accident." Lucio is on death row for the abuse and death of her daughter, who was two years old. Kardashian deleted the series of tweets the same day. When Lucio was granted a stay of execution on April 25, Kardashian celebrated on her social media channels.

In July 2022, Kardashian expressed support and petitioned for the release of rapper Gunna, who was imprisoned without bond, charged with one count of violating the Racketeer Influenced and Corrupt Organizations Act. However, in October of the same year, Gunna was again denied release from jail ahead of his January trial. In December, Gunna pled guilty to a single charge of racketeering and was sentenced to five years in prison, with one year commuted to time served and the rest of the sentence suspended subject to probation conditions. He was soon released from jail, and instead was ordered to serve 500 hours of community service.

In December 2023, Kardashian publicly expressed her belief in the innocence of Alabama prisoner Toforest Johnson, who has been on death row for more than 25 years despite calls for his conviction to be overturned from the original trial prosecutor in his case and the current District Attorney, Danny Carr. Kardashian posted about Johnson's case on her Instagram account, asking "Who is Toforest Johnson? And why does the state of Alabama have an innocent man on death row?" She added a link to Earwitness, a serial podcast about Johnson's case, to an advocacy website that contains more information about Johnson's case. Kardashian spoke out about Johnson's case again in spring 2024, when she posted a video of Johnson's daughter Akeriya Terry on her Instagram account. Johnson remains on Alabama's death row and no execution date has yet been set.

In September 2024, Kardashian visited convicted murderers Lyle and Erik Menendez, along with more than 30 other inmates, at the Richard J. Donovan Correctional Facility as part of a meeting on prison reform. Accompanying Kardashian during the visit were her sister Khloé, mother Kris, film producer Scott Budnick, actor Cooper Koch—who portrayed Erik in the Netflix limited series Monsters: The Lyle and Erik Menendez Story—and Koch's partner, filmmaker Stuart McClave. The following month, Kardashian published an essay for NBC News advocating for the brothers' release, arguing that they were "not monsters" and had been failed by a justice system that did not adequately account for their alleged abuse or their subsequent rehabilitation. Her essay coincided with a renewed legal review of the case by the Los Angeles County District Attorney's office. In May 2025, the brothers were resentenced to 50 years to life, making them eligible for parole under California law because they were under 26 years old at the time of the murders. They were denied parole in August 2025 but are scheduled for another hearing in March 2027.

== Filmography ==
Films

- Kim Kardashian, Superstar (2007)
- Disaster Movie (2008)
- Deep in the Valley (2009)
- Temptation: Confessions of a Marriage Counselor (2013)
- Zoolander: Super Model (2016)
- Paw Patrol: The Movie (2021)
- Paw Patrol: The Mighty Movie (2023)

Television

- Keeping Up with the Kardashians (2007–2021)
- WrestleMania XXIV (2008)
- Kourtney and Kim Take Miami (2009–2013)
- Kourtney and Kim Take New York (2011–2012)
- Dash Dolls (2015)
- Kim Kardashian West: The Justice Project (2020)
- The Kardashians (2022–present)
- American Horror Story: Delicate (2023–2024)
- All's Fair (2025–present)

== Awards and nominations ==
Teen Choice Awards

Year	Category	Nominated work / Nominee	Result	Ref.
2008	Choice TV Female Reality/Variety Star	Keeping Up with the Kardashians	Nominated	
2009	Choice TV: Female Reality/Variety Star	Keeping Up with the Kardashians	Nominated	
2010	Choice Female Reality/Variety Star (Note: With Kourtney, Khloé, Rob and Kris.)	Keeping Up with the Kardashians	Won	
2010	Choice Female Hottie	Kim Kardashian	Nominated	
2010	Choice Twit	Kim Kardashian	Nominated	
2011	Choice TV: Female Reality/Variety Star	Keeping Up with the Kardashians	Won	
2011	Choice Female Hottie	Kim Kardashian	Nominated	
2012	Choice TV: Female Reality/Variety Star	Keeping Up with the Kardashians	Won	
2013	Choice TV: Female Reality/Variety Star (Note: With Kourtney, Khloé, Rob, Kris, Kendall, Kylie and Bruce. (Note: Prior to her gender transition, Caitlyn went by her birth middle name Bruce.))	Keeping Up with the Kardashians	Won	
2016	Choice TV Show: Reality	Keeping Up with the Kardashians	Won	
2016	Choice Selfie Taker	Kim Kardashian	Nominated	
2016	Choice Instagramer	Kim Kardashian	Nominated	
2016	Choice Social Media Queen	Kim Kardashian	Nominated	

People's Choice Awards

Year	Category	Nominated work / Nominee	Result	Ref.
2011	Favorite TV Celeb Reality Star	Herself	Won	
2017	Favorite Social Media Star	Herself	Nominated	
2019	Social Celebrity	Herself	Nominated	
2019	Style Star	Herself	Nominated	
2020	Reality TV Star	Keeping Up With The Kardashians	Nominated	
2020	Social Celebrity	Herself	Nominated	
2020	Style Star	Herself	Nominated	
2021	Reality TV Star	Keeping Up With The Kardashians	Nominated	
2021	Social Star	Herself	Nominated	
2021	Fashion Icon Award	Herself	Nominated	
2022	Reality TV Star	The Kardashians	Nominated	
2024	Reality TV Star of the Year	The Kardashians	Nominated	
2024	Social Celebrity of the Year	Herself	Nominated	

Other awards

Year	Association	Category	Nominated work / Nominee	Result	Ref.
2008	Golden Raspberry Awards	Worst Supporting Actress	Disaster Movie	Nominated	
2014	Golden Raspberry Awards	Worst Supporting Actress	Temptation: Confessions of a Marriage Counselor	Won	
2011	Glamour Award	Entrepreneur of the Year	Kim Kardashian	Won	
2018	CFDA	Influencer Award	Kim Kardashian	Won	
2016	Webby Awards	Break the Internet Award	Kim Kardashian	Won	

== Bibliography ==
- Kardashian, Kim; Kardashian, Kourtney; Kardashian, Khloé (2010). Kardashian Konfidential. St. Martin's Press. ISBN 9780312628079.
- Kardashian, Kim; Kardashian, Kourtney; Kardashian, Khloé (2011). Dollhouse. William Morrow and Company. ISBN 9780062063847.
- Kardashian, Kim (2015). Selfish. Universe Publishing. ISBN 9780789329202.

== See also ==
- Famous for being famous
- List of most-followed Instagram accounts
- List of most-followed Twitter accounts
