= Purple Clover =

English-language news and lifestyle online magazine

- Website type: Online magazine
- Available in: English
- Owner: Whalerock Industries
- Editor: Larry Carlat
- Website: purpleclover.com
- Launched: 2013
- Current status: Non Active - redirects to LittleThings.com

Purple Clover was an English language news and lifestyle online magazine aimed at an audience 50 years and older. It was owned and launched by Whalerock Industries in 2013. In September 2018, RockYou Media acquired Purple Clover from Whalerock Industries. The deal also included Mom.me, another digital property developed by Whalerock. The financial details of the sale were not disclosed, according to Variety.

The Purple Clover website now redirects to LittleThings.com, bought by RockYou Media at the same time as the Purple Clover acquisition.

== Background ==
Purple Clover was launched in July 2013. It was owned and launched by Whalerock Industries, formerly BermanBraun. The site featured content tailored to the interests of people aged 50 and above, especially younger Baby Boomers and older members of Generation X. The sites aim was to provide content that is more fun, inspirational, and edgy than is usually pitched at this demographic.

Purple Clover described itself as being for people who are "...still cool, still curious, and still crazy after all these years."

== Format ==
A feature of Purple Clover was "What's Goin' On," a short take on current news and popular stories, published throughout the day. Major content is divided into these sections: Relationships, Entertainment, Lifestyle, Health, Work, Money, and Life Reimagined.

Purple Clover sought active engagement with readers on its Facebook page, which at one time was approaching 8 million fans.
