= Selfish (book) =

Book by Kim Kardashian

- The cover of Selfish, inspired by Kardashian's then-husband Kanye West and his creative agency Donda
- Author: Kim Kardashian
- Language: English
- Publisher: Universe Publishing
- Publication date: May 5, 2015
- Media type: Print (hardback)
- Pages: 448
- ISBN: 978-0789329202

Selfish is a coffee table book written by television personality Kim Kardashian. It was released on May 5, 2015, by the Universe imprint of the art bookseller Rizzoli. The book features Kardashian's personal selfies, collecting various images previously posted on Kardashian's social media accounts. The photobook received positive reviews from critics.

== Background ==
Kim Kardashian has grown an influential online and social media presence, and has always been known for taking selfies, and was called "queen of selfies" by The New York Times. In an interview with Adweek, Kardashian mentioned that she has been taking pictures of herself for decades, and said:

[I took] my first selfie in 1984 and that opens up the book. [...] For a decade, I've carried a big digital camera, and I think it's just fascinating to see the process of what types of photos evolve. Mine started off on digital cameras, then they went to a BlackBerry and then a smartphone. There's just such an evolution of the selfie. And I captured that, I think, really well.

The photobook was announced in August 2014; the idea to assemble a book from selfies first came to Kardashian when she was thinking of what to give to her husband Kanye West as a Valentine's Day gift. "I couldn't think of what to get Kanye [for Valentine's Day] and so I was like, 'All guys love it when a girl sends them sexy pics.' So I had Stephanie [Kim's assistant] get a Polaroid, and we were taking photos around the entire house…making this cool book," Kardashian commented on an idea during an episode of Keeping Up with the Kardashians. "It ended up turning out so cool we came up with this idea to do a selfie book. So I'm going to make some super racy," she continued.

== Concept ==
The book features various selfies of Kardashian, including travel pictures, family photos, and swimsuit shots. The book also features various nude photographs, including pictures that were leaked during the celebrity photo hack in September 2014. Kardashian explained the reasoning of including the pictures: "I wasn't intending to put these in the book but saw them online during the iCloud hack. I'm not mad at them. [...] They are taken with a Blackberry and I don't have iCloud... It's all a mystery!". The book contains pictures with her then-husband Kanye West and daughter North West. The book also includes selfies with her celebrity friends, such as Ciara, Faye Resnick, La La Anthony, Jennifer Lopez, Jonathan Cheban, Paris Hilton, among others, as well as her family members: Kourtney Kardashian, Khloe Kardashian, Kendall Jenner, Kylie Jenner and Rob Kardashian.

== Release ==
The photobook was released on May 5, 2015. Prior to the official date, Kardashian released a limited-edition version of the book on April 16, 2015. It featured an alternative cover with a selfie of Kardashian wearing a red bikini. The version became available on Gilt.com with a limited availability of 500 copies of numbered and signed version of the book, which reportedly were sold out in a minute. The new and updated volume of Selfish was scheduled to be released on October 11, 2016. The revised and expanded edition would contain 64 additional pages featuring Kardashian's selfies, including many never-seen-before images.

== Reception ==
"As a physical object, the book is surprisingly elegant: a compact white bible, a thing beckoning to be held. The suggested interpretation of its cover photo — exquisite little head perched atop exquisite massive breasts — is implied by the resonant word that sits beneath it: Rizzoli. This is the post-Calabasas Kim, the Kanye West Kim, the Kim who must be deferred to by the world’s greatest photographers and designers. But it’s still our Kim, taking picture after picture of herself in full makeup or full monte, sticking out her tongue or her naked bottom, the mysteries of her arresting beauty undercut."

— Caitlin Flanagan from The New York Times

The photobook received positive reviews from critics. Kat Brown of The Telegraph described the book as "unexpectedly revealing" and "oddly moving", also adding that "by the time you get to her photobombing another friend mid-selfie [...] or making faces with her family [...], you think that she'd actually be quite a laugh to go out with". Madeline Roth of MTV News noted the book's significance by saying that it is "the first of its kind on the book market today: a literal book of selfies by one of the most famous human beings in the world." Megan Garber of The Atlantic said the book "takes [Kardashian's] (in)famous love of her own image to a logical, and also absurdist, extreme," comparing the book to "Kramer's coffee table book about coffee tables". Gregory Babcock, a writer for the Complex magazine, wrote a very positive review of the book, and said: "Selfish reveals that what may seem insipid and overblown initially is actually a far smarter, more calculated window into the life and times of one of our culture’s most relevant public figures through the simple, albeit absurd, art of documenting herself."

Jillian Mapes of Flavorwire commented that the book "occupies a place somewhere between a Marina Abramović stunt and your Facebook friend who splices together brief video clips every day for year". Mapes further said: "But because she looks less than perfect in many of these photos, [...] it’s hard for me to flip through Selfish and feel like it’s as wildly vain as it appears at first glance. Madonna’s Sex, Selfish is not, at least with regard to art direction and styling". Sarah Begley, writing for Time, appreciated Kardashian giving credit to her make-up artists and stylists in the captions under the pictures. Begley quips, "The architecture of the Sistine Chapel may be exemplary, but it’s Michelangelo’s paint job that packs in the crowds".

Laura Bennett wrote a positive review of the book for Slate and described the book as "insane project, a document of mind-blowing vanity and deranged perseverance". Bennett further accentuated the book's format, and said: "You could call Selfish a sneakily feminist document, an act of reclamation by one of the world's most photographed women". Leah Bourne of StyleCaster said that "Kardashian has ushered in a new kind of fame—one in which you can be famous for seemingly being nothing more than yourself—with this book she might also be ushering in a new form of autobiography". Bourne also noted that the book "takes a lot of cues" from other photobooks such as Sex featuring shots of Madonna by Fabien Baron or Kate Moss' portrait collection composed by Mario Testino. Haley Mlotek from the National Post called the book "a welcome reprieve" and noted that "the images collected in Selfish will be a crucial part of how we know and understand Kardashian West as a person, a public figure, and a global phenomenon".

Writing for The Guardian, Jonathan Jones wrote that the photobook is "the ultimate slap in the face for anyone who ever pointed a camera with high hopes of being the new Henri Cartier-Bresson or Don McCullin" and suggested that "Kardashian’s selfie-taking is, in reality, a sustained act of self-exploitation in which she sells herself as commodified, leered-at flesh."
