= Crown Maple Syrup =

American maple syrup company

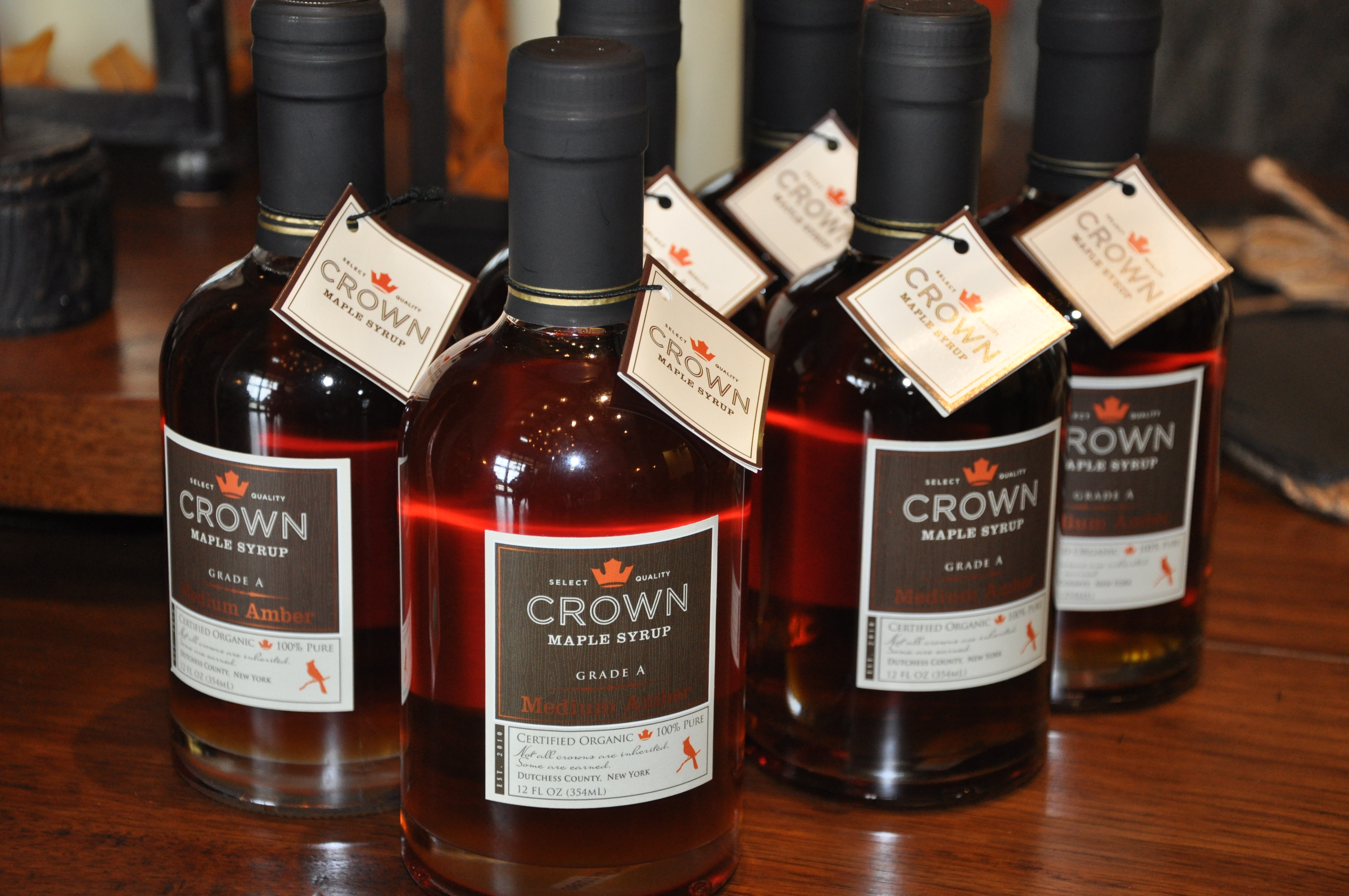
A selection of Crown Maple Syrup

Crown Maple Syrup is a certified organic maple syrup company based in Dover Plains, NY. The company was established by Robb Turner in 2010. The sap used to make maple syrup comes from tapped maple trees in regions spanning from the Hudson Valley to Western Vermont. The syrup is processed and bottled at Madava Farms on an 800-acre site. The farm is considered to be the largest maple syrup production facility in North America.

== History ==
The 800-acre piece of land, located on the town borders of Unionvale, Millbrook, and Dover Plains, was farmland during the Civil War. Afterwards, farming on the property came to a halt, and an unusually high concentration of maples sprung up. Initially purchased for vacation purposes in 2006, Turner was informed by neighbors that the 800 acre property contained approximately 20,000 maple trees. Having no prior knowledge of maple syrup production, Turner consulted the Cornell Cooperative Extension and learned methods for sustainable syrup production. The area was left untouched until 2007, when the property was bought by Robb Turner, a former Wall Street banker, and his wife, Lydia. The couple decided to use the land to found a maple syrup company. The company was called "Crown Maple," and the farm was named Madava Farms, after the Turners' daughters, Ava and Maddie. The Turners tapped their first trees in 2011 and opened the farm to the public in 2012. The property has at least 40,000 maple trees and a 27,000-square-foot sugarhouse.

In January 2013, Madava Farms received state grant award money for the purpose of creating a "tourist destination" in the Mid-Hudson Valley. Lincoln Ristorante chef Jonathan Benno designed a kitchen for Madava Farms' cafe.

== Syrup Production ==
The 27,000-square foot sugar house on Madava Farms houses the equipment for syrup production, a café and special events dining room, and a store selling crown maple products and other goods. Like many modern maple producers, Crown Maple uses a reverse osmosis filtration system, which removes 80% of the water content from the sap and filters out impurities. The facility also contains one of the largest maple syrup evaporators ever built. In an effort to ensure that the syrup production process has a minimized environmental impact, the equipment is cleaned using steam from the evaporation process. This reduces the amount of water used, which is both ecologically and financially beneficial The finished syrup rates a 67 on the Brix scale, higher than the standard 66%, but below the legal limit of 68%.

== Sales and Expansion ==
Crown Maple's current machinery can handle the sap from up to 400,000 tapped trees. With approximately 100,000 trees currently tapped, the planned expansion to tap up to 400,000 trees would make Crown Maple the world's largest single producer of maple syrup.

Crown Maple’s syrup is categorized based on color and flavor: Golden, Amber, Dark, Very Dark, and Bourbon Barrel-Aged. The flavor of a particular batch of maple syrup is determined entirely by the condition of the sap as it flows from the trees. This is based on a variety of climatic factors. In addition to maple syrup, the company also sells maple sugar.

Its products are now used at restaurants like Le Bernadin, Eleven Madison Park, and Lincoln Ristorante. Crown Maple syrup is also an ingredient in a Mast Brothers chocolate bar, Early Bird granola, Nuts & Bolts Brooklyn Gluten-free Granola, and Steve’s and Blue Marble ice creams. The syrup is also available at West Elm, Dean & DeLuca, and limited Whole Foods retailers.

== Equipment ==
Turner received consultation from the Cornell Cooperative Extension when buying technology and equipment for the operation. The farm prides itself in its technology and environmental sustainability. To reduce the likeliness of tree infection, thin polymer plastic tubes are used to carry sap to the collection house. The farm also aims to save fuel by not boiling the syrup initially and instead using osmosis machines. As well as eliminating bacteria and cellulose material, the reverse osmosis machines remove up to 75% of the water from the sap. Extracted water is used for watering the property and cleaning the machinery.
