= Spotify Kids =

Spotify mobile app for children

- Logo used since 2019
- Developer: Spotify
- Initial release: February 11, 2020; 6 years ago
- Operating system: iOS, Android
- Included with: Spotify Premium Family
- Website: www.spotify.com/kids

Spotify Kids is a Swedish kid-friendly Music streaming service developed by Spotify. It offers curated content for children, including music, audiobooks, lullabies, and bedtime stories, while providing their parents with parental controls. The service is only available to subscribers to Spotify's Premium Family subscription plan.

== Function ==
Spotify Kids is a Swedish Kid-friendly Music Streaming Service that allows children to browse Spotify with parental controls. Using the app, parents can view their children's listening history, block specific songs, and share playlists with their children. The app also includes sing-along songs, playlists designed for young children, and curated audiobooks, lullabies, and bedtime stories. Access is included in Spotify's Premium Family subscription plan, and is exclusive to subscribers to the plan. Users can configure the app for a specific age group upon first launch.

The playlists on Spotify Kids are curated by groups including Discovery Kids, Nickelodeon, Universal Pictures, and The Walt Disney Company. All content on the Spotify Kids app is curated by editors. As of March 2021, there were roughly 8,000 songs available on the platform.

The design of the Spotify Kids app is colorful, and user interface varies depending on the age group for which the app is configured.

Spotify Kids is designed to comply with consent and data collection regulations for apps used by children. TechCrunch explains that it is "designed on a grand scale to drive subscriptions to Spotify's top-tier $14.99-per-month Premium Family Plan."

== Release ==
After being beta tested in Ireland in October 2019, it was released as a beta across the United Kingdom on February 11, 2020. It was later released in Sweden, Denmark, Australia, New Zealand, Mexico, Argentina, and Brazil. On March 31, 2021, it was made available in France, Canada, and the United States.
