= Kimoji =

Smartphone app

Kimoji was a smartphone app with Kim Kardashian-themed emojis. It was top seller on the Apple App Store and spawned a cottage industry of celebrity emoji apps.

== Content ==
The Kimoji app gave users a custom selection of over 250 Kim Kardashian-themed emojis and animated GIFs to use in messaging apps. Many of the icons are sexual in nature, depicting Kardashian's breasts and butt, but others include Kardashian crying, hearts, doughnuts, and kisses. Later additions included sexualized images such as an animated handprint slapped on a butt and an intimate couple in a shower.

== Development ==
Kardashian promoted the app on Instagram and Twitter the day of its launch, December 21, 2015. Kardashian said the project was in development for almost two years.

== Reception and legacy ==
At its launch, the app had 9,000 downloads each second. The app earned $1 million per minute despite having mediocre initial App Store ratings. The Kimoji trademark led to a merchandise campaign selling products including pool floats, Post-it notes shaped like Kardashian's butt, fragrances, and smartphone accessories.

Kimoji spawned a cottage industry of celebrity emoji apps in 2016, including Steph Curry's StephMoji, Justin Bieber's Justmoji, Amber Rose's MuvaMoji, and Hillary Clinton's Hillarymoji. Like Kimoji, StephMoji was a top-selling app on the Apple App Store. A web developer who considered Kimoji a societal ill created parody emoji based on North Korean dictator Kim Jong-un. Some of its illustrations mock Kimoji.
