= Kelly McGillis filmography =

Cataloging of performances by the American actress

Kelly McGillis is an American actress. She has appeared in several films since the 1980s including her role as Rachel Lapp in Witness (1985) with Harrison Ford, for which she received Golden Globe and BAFTA nominations, Charlotte "Charlie" Blackwood in Top Gun (1986) with Tom Cruise, and Kathryn Murphy in The Accused (1988).

== Filmography ==
=== Film ===
Year	Title	Role	Notes
1983	Reuben, Reuben	Geneva Spofford	
1985	Witness	Rachel Lapp	
1986	Top Gun	Charlotte 'Charlie' Blackwood	
1987	Made in Heaven	Annie Packert / Ally Chandler	
1987	Unsettled Land	Anda	
1987	Santabear's High Flying Adventure	Missy Bear	Voice; Short film
1988	The House on Carroll Street	Emily Crane	
1988	The Accused	Kathryn Murphy	
1989	Winter People	Collie Wright	
1989	Cat Chaser	Mary DeBoya	
1989	Rabbit Ears: Thumbelina	Narrator	Voice; Video short
1991	Grand Isle	Edna Pontellier	Also producer
1992	Weather Is Good on Deribasovskaya, It Rains Again on Brighton Beach	Marriott Manager	Cameo
1992	The Babe	Claire Merritt Ruth	
1992	Rabbit Ears: Noah and the Ark	Narrator	Voice; Video short
1994	North	Amish Mother	
1998	Painted Angels	Nettie	
1998	Ground Control	Susan Stratton	
1999	At First Sight	Jennie Adamson	
1999	The Settlement	Fake Barbara / Ellie	
2000	The Monkey's Mask	Diana Maitland	
2001	No One Can Hear You	Trish Burchall	
2001	Morgan's Ferry	Vonnie Carpenter	Direct-to-video
2007	Supergator	Kim Taft	Direct-to-video
2010	Stake Land	Sister	
2010	1 a Minute	Herself / Narrator	Voice; Documentary
2011	The Innkeepers	Leanne Rease-Jones	
2011	What Could Have Been	Margaret	
2013	We Are What We Are	Marge	
2013	Tio Papi	Elizabeth Warden	
2014	Grand Street	Isabelle	
2015	Blue	Ms. Hutcherson	

=== Television ===
Year	Title	Role	Notes
1984	Sweet Revenge	Katherine Dennison Breen	Television film
1984	One Life to Live	Glenda Livingston	Unknown episodes
1985	Private Sessions	Jennifer Coles	Television film
1986	Santabear's First Christmas	Narrator	Voice; Television film
1992	Perry Mason: The Case of the Fatal Framing	Mrs. Joel McKelvey	Television film Uncredited
1993	Bonds of Love	Rose Parks	Television film
1994	In the Best of Families	Susie Lynch	Miniseries
1995	Dark Eyes	Mila McGann	Unsold pilot
1995	Remember Me	Menly Nichols	Television film
1995	Out of Ireland	Narrator	Voice; Documentary
1996	We the Jury	Alyce Bell	Television film
1997	The Third Twin	Dr. Jean 'Jeannie' Ferrami	Television film
1998	Kate Chopin: A Re-Awakening	Narrator	Voice; Documentary
1998	Storm Chasers: Revenge of the Twister	Jamie Marshall	Television film
1998	Perfect Prey	Audrey Macleah	Television film
2000	The Wild Thornberrys	Winema	Voice; Episode: "Pack of Thornberrys"
2000	The Outer Limits	Nicole Whitley	Episodes: "Final Appeal: Parts 1 & 2"
2000	Buzz Lightyear of Star Command	Gorgeous Woman	Voice; Episode: "Planet of the Lost"
2003	Journey To Planet Earth	Narrator	Voice; Documentary series Episodes: "Land Of Plenty, Land Of Want", "Rivers Of Destiny", "The Urban Explosion"
2006	Black Widower	Nancy Westveld	Television film
2008	The L Word	Gillian Davis	Episodes: "Lesbians Gone Wild", "Lay Down the Law"
2014	Love Finds You in Sugarcreek, Ohio	Bertha Troyler	Television film
2014	Z Nation	Helen	Episode: "Sisters of Mercy"
2017	An Uncommon Grace	Elizabeth Conner	Television film
2018	Maternal Secrets	Rose Lewis	Television film
2020	Dirty John	Miriam Saslaw	Episode: "Scream Therapy"; Uncredited

=== Music videos ===
Year	Artist	Title	Role	Notes
1986	Kenny Loggins	"Danger Zone"	Charlotte 'Charlie' Blackwood	Archival footage from Top Gun
1986	Berlin	"Take My Breath Away"	Charlotte 'Charlie' Blackwood	Archival footage from Top Gun
