= Fangoria Chainsaw Award for Best Actor =

Horror movie award

The following is a list of Fangoria Chainsaw Award winners for Best Actor. The award was awarded annually to an actor for his work in a horror or thriller film. It was last awarded in 2020; the following year, leading and supporting performances were each placed into a single category, regardless of gender.

== Winners and nominees ==
=== 1990s ===
Year	Nominees	Film	Ref
1992	Anthony Hopkins	The Silence of the Lambs	
1993	Gary Oldman	Bram Stoker's Dracula	
1994	Bruce Campbell	Army of Darkness	
1995	Brandon Lee	The Crow	
1996	Christopher Walken	The Prophecy	
1997	George Clooney	From Dusk till Dawn	
1997	Corbin Bernsen	The Dentist	
1997	Rupert Everett	Cemetery Man	
1997	Michael J. Fox	The Frighteners	
1997	Richard E. Grant	The Cold Light of Day	
1998	Al Pacino	The Devil's Advocate	
1999	James Woods	Vampires	

=== 2000s ===
Year	Nominees	Film	Ref
2000	Johnny Depp	Sleepy Hollow	
2001	Christian Bale	American Psycho	
2002	Anthony Hopkins	Hannibal	
2002	Johnny Depp	From Hell	
2003	Robin Williams	One Hour Photo	
2003	Anthony Hopkins	Red Dragon	
2003	Mel Gibson	Signs	
2003	Michael Reilly Burke	Ted Bundy	
2003	Jake Weber	Wendigo	
2004	Bruce Campbell	Bubba Ho-Tep	
2004	Robert Englund	Freddy vs. Jason	
2004	Ralph Fiennes	Spider	
2004	Crispin Glover	Willard	
2004	Cillian Murphy	28 Days Later	
2005	Simon Pegg	Shaun of the Dead	
2005	Christian Bale	The Machinist	
2005	Ron Perlman	Hellboy	
2005	Johnny Depp	Secret Window	
2005	Desmond Harrington	Love Object	
2006	Sid Haig	The Devil's Rejects	
2006	John Jarratt	Wolf Creek	
2006	John Leguizamo	Land of the Dead	
2006	Stellan Skarsgård	Dominion: Prequel to the Exorcist	
2006	John Turturro	Fear X	
2007	No award		
2008	No award		
2009	Ron Perlman	Hellboy II: The Golden Army	
2009	Leo Bill	The Living and the Dead	
2009	Kare Hedebrant	Let the Right One In	
2009	Trevor Matthews	Jack Brooks: Monster Slayer	
2009	Marc Senter	The Lost	

=== 2010s ===
Year	Nominees	Film	Ref
2010	Jesse Eisenberg	Zombieland	
2010	Garret Dillahunt	The Last House on the Left	
2010	Viggo Mortensen	The Road	
2010	Stephen McHattie	Pontypool	
2010	Song Kang-ho	Thirst	
2011	Ryan Reynolds	Buried	
2011	Leonardo DiCaprio	Shutter Island	
2011	Kodi Smit-McPhee	Let Me In	
2011	Patrick Fabian	The Last Exorcism	
2011	James Le Gros	Bitter Feast	
2012	Antonio Banderas	The Skin I Live In	
2012	Sean Bean	Black Death	
2012	Nick Damici	Stake Land	
2012	Tyler Labine	Tucker & Dale vs. Evil	
2012	Noah Taylor	Red White & Blue	
2012	Choi Min-sik	I Saw the Devil	
2013	Liam Neeson	The Grey	
2013	Ethan Hawke	Sinister	
2013	Daniel Radcliffe	The Woman in Black	
2013	Luis Tosar	Sleep Tight	
2013	Neil Maskell	Kill List	
2014	Elijah Wood	Maniac	
2014	Patrick Wilson	Insidious: Chapter 2	
2014	Toby Jones	Berberian Sound Studio	
2014	Francisco Barreiro	Here Comes the Devil	
2014	Bill Sage	We Are What We Are	
2015	Daniel Radcliffe	Horns	
2015	Lior Ashkenazi	Big Bad Wolves	
2015	Nick Damici	Late Phases	
2015	Jake Gyllenhaal	Enemy	
2015	Jared Harris	The Quiet Ones	
2016	Kurt Russell	Bone Tomahawk	
2016	Mark Duplass	Creep	
2016	Tom Hiddleston	Crimson Peak	
2016	Lou Taylor Pucci	Spring	
2016	Henry Rollins	He Never Died	
2017	John Goodman	10 Cloverfield Lane	
2017	Anton Yelchin	Green Room	
2017	Gong Yoo	Train to Busan	
2017	Logan Marshall-Green	The Invitation	
2017	Max Records	I Am Not a Serial Killer	
2019	Nicolas Cage	Mandy	
2019	James Jude Courtney / Nick Castle	Halloween	
2019	Anders Danielsen Lie	The Night Eats the World	
2019	Matt Dillon	The House That Jack Built	
2019	Logan Marshall-Green	Upgrade	

=== 2020s ===
Year	Nominees	Film	Ref
2020	Robert Pattinson	The Lighthouse	
2020	Winston Duke	Us	
2020	Leif Edlund Johansson	Koko-di Koko-da	
2020	Ewan McGregor	Doctor Sleep	
2020	Daniel de Oliveria	The Nightshifter	
