= We Are What We Are (2010 film) =

2010 film by Jorge Michel Grau

- Film poster showing the character Sabina (Paulina Gaitán)
- Directed by: Jorge Michel Grau
- Screenplay by: Jorge Michel Grau
- Produced by: Nicolás Celis; Henner Hoffman; Liliana Pardo
- Starring: Carmen Beato, Daniel Giménez Cacho, Paulina Gaitán
- Cinematography: Santiago Sanchez
- Edited by: Rodrigo Ríos
- Music by: Enrico Chapela
- Production company: Centro de Capacitación Cinematográfica
- Distributed by: Canana Films
- Release date: March 15, 2010 (Guadalajara)
- Running time: 90 minutes
- Country: Mexico
- Language: Spanish

We Are What We Are (Spanish: Somos lo que hay) is a 2010 Mexican horror film directed by Jorge Michel Grau. A stand-alone sequel to Cronos (1993), the film is about a family who, after the death of the father, try to continue on with a disturbing, ritualistic tradition. The film stars Paulina Gaitán and Daniel Giménez Cacho, the latter of whom reprises his role from Cronos.

== Plot ==
At a shopping mall, a man suddenly dies on the sidewalk. At home, his family is wondering what has become of him. Dad is a watchmaker who repairs watches at the street market, and the family's sole means of support.

As Dad has not appeared for the day's work, Alfredo and Julián head to the market. Julián gets into a fight with a customer who claims that his watch is three weeks overdue. The woman who runs the market appears and tells the boys to get out; the rent for their booth at the market is three weeks in arrears.

When the boys arrive at home, their sister Sabina enters in a state of shock and announces that their father has died. Their mother, Patricia, locks herself in her room; the children wonder who is going to provide for the family now—specifically, their meals: this family performs cannibalistic rituals.

In a morgue, Tito the coroner and the director of the funeral home bring in Octavio and Owen, two police detectives. The coroner shows them a finger in a jar: it was pulled from Dad's stomach. The detectives are asked to solve this cold case. Initially, they resist, but as the film continues, they become more interested in the fame that will come with solving it.

Alfredo and Julián attempt to kidnap a homeless child from under a bridge, but are chased off by the other children. Next, they attempt to kidnap a prostitute, who also resists; Julián punches and stuffs her into the back seat of their car.

Back at home, the boys tie the prostitute to the kitchen table. Patricia comes in and beats the woman to death with a shovel, claiming that Alfredo does not know what he is doing, and that prostitutes are not appropriate for the ritual. Alfredo runs out while Julián and Sabina wrap the dead woman in a sheet. Julián and Patricia take the prostitute back to the corner where the boys picked her up and dump her in front of the other street workers. Patricia tells the women to leave her sons alone. The prostitutes report the incident to detectives Octavio and Owen.

Alfredo goes looking for another potential meal; he follows a group of young men to a gay bar, and begins to seduce one of them. At the same time, Patricia is having sex with a cab driver, in his car, in order to entice him to her home. Alfredo brings the young man from the bar home with him, but Julián says he will not eat a homosexual man. As Alfredo and Julián argue the point, the cab driver comes down from their mother's room. Alfredo's prey escapes while Patricia beats the older man over the head with a shovel and the family later kills him.

As Sabina and Patricia prepare the man for eating, Alfredo and Julián chase after the gay boy. The boy runs to a fast food stand and asks the police to protect him. Detectives Octavio and Owen hear the call over their police radio and head to the scene. They decline to call for backup, as they want to keep the glory of the collar for themselves.

Detective Octavio stops Alfredo and Julián in an alley, holding them at gunpoint, but is shot by a uniformed officer who mistakes Octavio for a criminal. Detective Owen discovers Sabina and Patricia preparing their meal in a ritualistic fashion, but the women kill him. Alfredo and Julián arrive home; Patricia insists on completing the ritual, but Alfredo drags her away to escape over the rooftops.

The police break into the family's home and Julián shoots several of them before the family manages to hide upstairs. Their mother says that one must survive to carry on the ritual and flees to the rooftop. The prostitutes shown earlier in the film see her escaping and pursue her.

Meanwhile, Alfredo bites Sabina's neck. Julián, thinking Alfredo's attempting to eat Sabina, shoots Alfredo. The police kill Julián and take Sabina away in an ambulance, believing that she is a surviving victim. The next morning Patricia's body is discovered in a playground, beaten to death.

After escaping from the hospital, Sabina watches a young man in the market, intent on her next meal.

== Cast ==
- Humberto Yáñez as Dad
- Carmen Beato as Patricia the Mother
- Francisco Barreiro as Alfredo the Older Brother
- Alan Chávez as Julián the Younger Brother
- Paulina Gaitán as Sabina the Sister
- Daniel Giménez Cacho as Tito the Coroner, a character that previously appeared in the horror film Cronos (1993)
- Juan Carlos Colombo as Director of the funeral home
- Jorge Zárate as Detective Owen
- Esteban Soberanes as Detective Octavio
- Octavio Michel as Teniente
- Miguel Ángel Hoppe as Gustavo
- Raúl Kennedy as Adán
- Adrián Aguirre as Adriana
- Miriam Balderas as Sheyla

== Production ==
The director Jorge Michel Grau himself narrated his film on the 2010 Cannes Film Festival. We Are What We Are was completely shot in Mexico City. Daniel Giménez Cacho reprised his role as Tito the Coroner, a character from the horror film Cronos from 1993, directed by Guillermo del Toro. Some characters are also played by Paulina Gaitán and Francisco Barreiro who won with his former project Perpetuum Mobile film the Best Mexican Feature award on the Guadalajara International Film Festival.

== Release ==
It featured the Mexico's National Film School and premiered on March 15, 2010, as part of the Guadalajara International Film Festival. The film tells of the violence of the people and their foreclosure and was part of the Cannes Film Market 2010. The Mexican horror film is part of the Fantasia 2010. The film was released in the United States by IFC Films as We Are What We Are. The film had his UK premiere on August 30, 2010, as part of the Film4 FrightFest 2010. IFC Films released the film in the United States in late 2010 as a video on demand title under their genre label IFC Midnight, while Artificial Eye released it in the United Kingdom on November 12, 2010.

== Reception ==
Deborah Young of Reuters said, that We Are What We Are "is perhaps too dark and relentlessly humorless to find wide international audiences." Young stated that "another limiting factor is the difficulty of identifying with any of the characters, who are played expressively but still remain abstract and alien, distant from the viewer."

Rotten Tomatoes gives the film a 72% based on 47 reviews from critics, with an average rating of 5.78/10. The site's critics consensus reads, "We Are What We Are is elevated horror that combines family drama and social politics, with plenty of gore on top."

== Awards ==
Fantastic Fest

- Best Film
- Best Screenplay

Fantasia International Film Festival

- Séquences Ex-Aequo Award

Expresión en Corto International Film Festival

- Best First Film

Chicago International Film Festival

- Silver Hugo-Special Jury Prize

Festival international du film fantastique de Gérardmer

- Jury Prize

== Remake ==
Memento Films International optioned the rights for an English-language remake starring Julia Garner and Ambyr Childers, directed by Jim Mickle and written by Mickle and Nick Damici, who previously worked together on Mulberry Street and Stake Land.
