= Kelly McGillis =

American actress (born 1957)

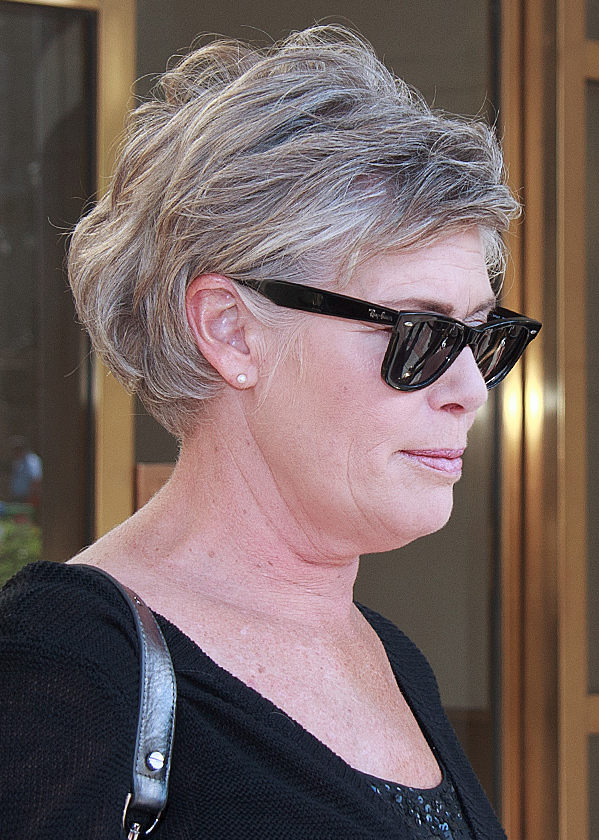
- McGillis at 2010 Toronto International Film Festival
- Born: Kelly Ann McGillis; July 9, 1957 (age 69); Newport Beach, California, U.S.
- Education: Juilliard School (BFA)
- Occupation: Actress
- Years active: 1976–present
- Notable work: Filmography
- Spouses: Boyd Black (m. 1979; div. 1981) Fred Tillman (m. 1989; div. 2002)
- Partner: Melanie Leis (2010–2011)
- Children: 2

Kelly Ann McGillis (born July 9, 1957) is an American actress. She is known for her film roles such as Rachel Lapp in Witness (1985), for which she received Golden Globe and BAFTA nominations; Charlotte 'Charlie' Blackwood in Top Gun (1986); Made in Heaven (1987); The House on Carroll Street (1988); and as Kathryn Murphy in The Accused (1988). In her later career, she has starred in horror films such as Stake Land (2010), The Innkeepers (2011), and We Are What We Are (2013).

== Early life ==
Kelly Ann McGillis was born on July 9, 1957, in the Southern California suburb of Newport Beach, California, the eldest of three daughters born to Virginia Joan (née Snell), a homemaker, and Donald Manson McGillis, a physician. Her direct paternal descent is Scots-Irish, including German and Welsh ancestry. She attended Newport Harbor High School.

McGillis attended the Pacific Conservatory of the Performing Arts at Allan Hancock College in Santa Maria, California. After dropping out of high school in 1975, she obtained her GED and then moved to New York City to study acting at the Juilliard School, where she graduated in 1983, Group 12.

== Career ==
=== Film ===
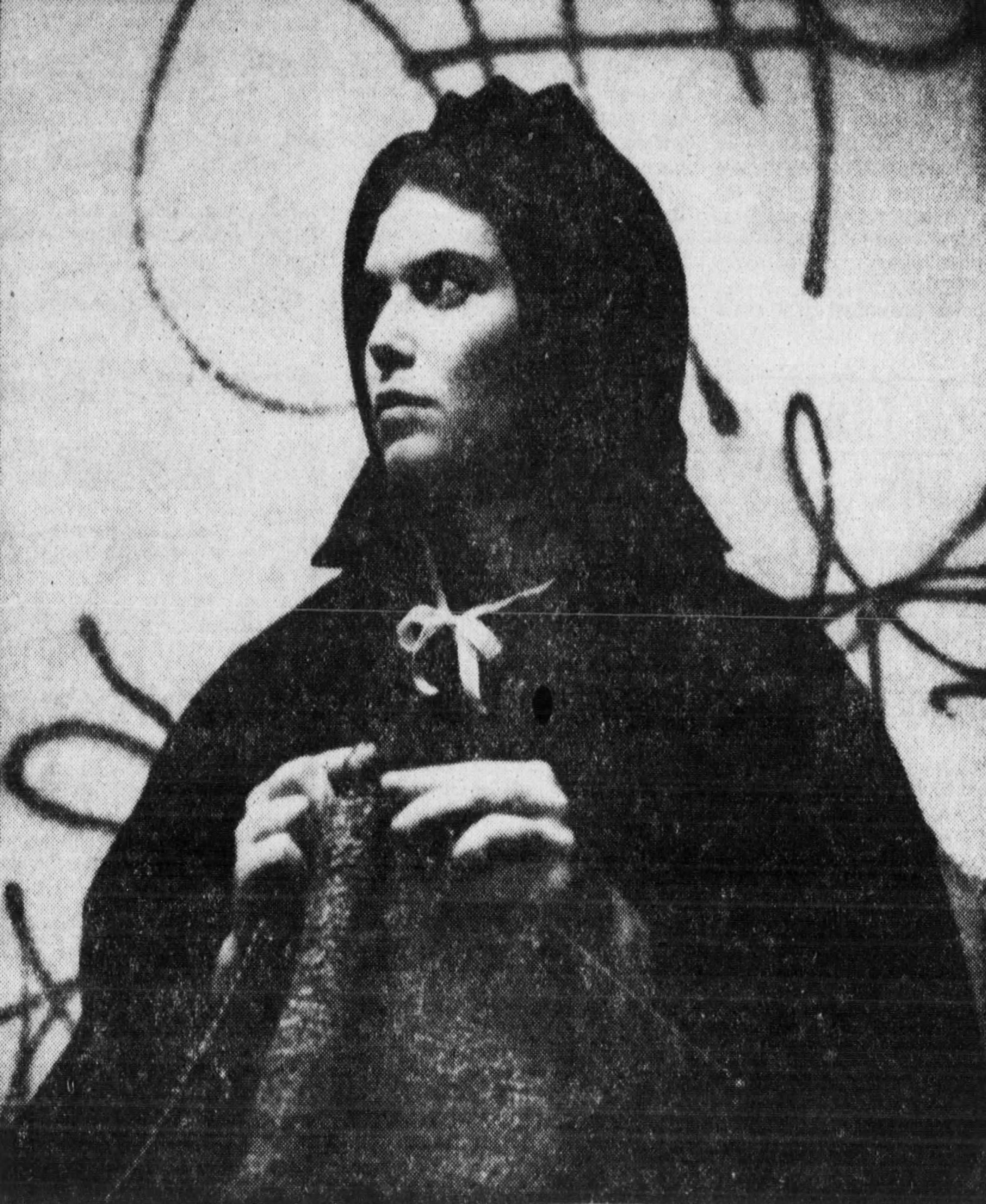
McGillis on the set of Witness (1984)

After making her film debut in Reuben, Reuben in 1983, McGillis's breakout role was that of an Amish mother in Witness (1985), for which she received Golden Globe and BAFTA award nominations. Her next high-profile role was that of flight instructor Charlotte Blackwood (call sign "Charlie") in the 1986 fighter-pilot film Top Gun, starring alongside Tom Cruise. In 1987, McGillis acted in the romance film Made in Heaven alongside Timothy Hutton, which was produced by Lorimar Productions.

McGillis played the part of caretaker for Miss Venable (Jessica Tandy) in 1988's The House on Carroll Street, which also starred Jeff Daniels. At the same year, she also appeared in The Accused, where she played the role of Kathryn Murphy opposite Jodie Foster. After The Accused, she appeared in Cat Chaser with Peter Weller, a film which she despised and discouraged her from pursuing an acting career. McGillis later appeared in dozens of film and television roles throughout the 1990s before taking a break from acting for a few years.

McGillis played the part of Babe Ruth's second wife, Claire Merritt Ruth, in The Babe (1992). From the late-1980s to the mid-1990s, McGillis appeared in Winter People (1989) and North (1994), her second Amish part in film or television, as well as several made-for-TV movies.

In 1999, McGillis co-starred with Val Kilmer (who plays Virgil, a blind man) for the second time as his over protective sister in At First Sight. She played the suspect in the disappearance of a young woman in The Monkey's Mask (2000), an international lesbian cult film starring Susie Porter. The film is based on the novel of the same name by Australian poet Dorothy Porter.

=== Television ===
McGillis's early television roles included a part on the daytime soap One Life to Live in 1984.

She starred in the 1984 television movie Sweet Revenge (also known as Bittersweet Revenge) with Alec Baldwin. Other television films during the 1980s included Private Sessions in 1985, and as a narrator in Santabear's First Christmas. She also narrated the documentary Out of Ireland for PBS in 1995.

=== Stage ===
While at Juilliard she performed in William Congreve's Love for Love, directed by John Bletchley. She appeared in a couple of off-broadway and Broadway productions during the 1980s in New York City.

During the late-1980s and through the mid-2000s, McGillis was a featured actress at the prestigious Shakespeare Theatre Company in Washington, D.C. In 2002, she appeared in production of John Webber's play The Duchess of Malfi at the Shakespeare Theatre, Washington, DC.

In 2004, she appeared in the stage play The Graduate as Mrs. Robinson, touring the United States. McGillis starred in a Pasadena Playhouse stage production of The Little Foxes by Lillian Hellman in May 2009, co-starring with Julia Duffy.

Her stage work includes: Don Juan (1982), The Seagull (1985), Peccadillo (1985), The Merchant of Venice (1988), Twelfth Night (1989), Mary Stuart (1990), The Merry Wives of Windsor (1990), Hedda Gabler (1994), Mourning Becomes Electra (1997), A Midsummer Night's Dream (1999), Measure for Measure (1999) and The Graduate (2004), together with additional roles in Love for Love, Six Characters in Search of an Author, Three Sisters and The Winter's Tale. She also appeared in a production of Frankie and Johnny in the Clair de Lune by Terrence McNally, which toured the United Kingdom in 2010.

=== Return to film and TV ===
McGillis began working in television again in 2006, then in 2007 joined the cast of Showtime's The L Word for its fifth season. She had a role in the 2010 vampire film Stake Land, directed by Jim Mickle, starring alongside Nick Damici, Connor Paolo and Danielle Harris. McGillis was featured in a breast cancer docu-drama titled 1 a Minute, also released in 2010. She starred in Ti West's 2011 thriller The Innkeepers and later appeared in We Are What We Are and Tio Papi (both were released in 2013). Her subsequent roles include Grand Street, Love Finds You in Sugarcreek, Ohio and An Uncommon Grace (both were McGillis's third and fourth Amish-themed films), an episode of Z Nation, Blue, and Maternal Secrets.

== Personal life ==
McGillis married fellow Juilliard student Boyd Black in 1979; the couple divorced in 1981.

In 1982, while studying at Juilliard, McGillis was raped at knifepoint in her Manhattan apartment by two young men, one of whom was a teenager named Leroy Johnson. The attackers threatened to kill her before fleeing when police arrived. McGillis later described the trauma in a 1988 People magazine interview, saying it left her with severe nightmares, self-blame, and substance issues; she cited the experience as a reason for declining the victim role and instead playing the prosecutor in The Accused.

In the mid-1980s, she dated Warren Beatty. She married Fred Tillman in 1989, and they have two daughters. The couple divorced in 2002.

The Centurion, a 110-foot schooner valued at $1.5 million owned by McGillis and her then-husband Tillman, was destroyed by fire in April 1996 at a marina in Dania, Florida. The fire started on an adjacent boat at the Port LauDania marina on a Dania Cutoff Canal and spread to the schooner. Tillman had brought the boat from the couple's home in Key West in hopes of selling it at the Fort Lauderdale Boat Show.

McGillis came out as a lesbian in 2009 during an interview with SheWired. In 2010, she entered into a civil union with Melanie Leis, a Philadelphia sales executive. They had met in 2000 when Leis was a bartender at the Caribbean Bar Grill & Brewery in Key West, Florida, which McGillis owned with her then-husband.

McGillis worked full-time with drug addicts and alcoholics at Seabrook House Drug Alcohol Rehab Center, a rehabilitation center in Bridgeton, New Jersey, when she and Leis shared a home in Collingswood.

McGillis currently lives in Hendersonville, North Carolina. As of 2013, she has taught acting at the New York Studio for Stage and Screen (NYS3) in Asheville, North Carolina.

=== 2016 home invasion ===
McGillis was left scratched and bruised after she was assaulted by a woman who broke into her home on June 17, 2016. She said the attack, as well as others which she has been a victim of in the past, led her to apply for a concealed carry permit to protect herself. Following the incident, a 38-year-old woman, Laurence Marie Dorn, was charged with second-degree burglary, misdemeanor larceny, misdemeanor stalking, assault and battery, and interfering with emergency communication. Later, Dorn was convicted of misdemeanor breaking and entering and sentenced to probation.

== Awards and nominations ==
Year	Association	Category	Nominated work	Result
1986	Golden Globe Awards	Best Supporting Actress	Witness	Nominated
1986	BAFTA Awards	Best Actress	Witness	Nominated
1986	Jupiter Award	Best International Actress	Witness	Nominated
1986	Bravo Otto	Best Actress	Top Gun	Won
1987	Jupiter Award	Best International Actress	Top Gun	Nominated
1987	Bravo Otto	Best Actress	Made in Heaven	Won
1987	Golden Ciak	Best Actress	Made in Heaven	Won
1988	Bravo Otto	Best Actress	The Accused	Bronze
1989	Jupiter Award	Best International Actress	The Accused	Nominated
2018	California Women's Film Festival	Best Supporting Actress	Maternal Secrets	Nominated
2018	Southampton International Film Festival	Supporting Actress in a Feature	Maternal Secrets	Nominated
