= Lanny Flaherty =

American film and television actor (1942–2024)

- Born: July 27, 1942; Pontotoc, Mississippi, U.S.
- Died: February 18, 2024 (aged 81); New York City, U.S.
- Education: University of Southern Mississippi
- Occupation: Actor
- Years active: 1984–2020

Lanny Flaherty (July 27, 1942 – February 18, 2024) was an American actor.

== Life and career ==
Flaherty had roles in films and miniseries such as Lonesome Dove, Natural Born Killers, Book of Shadows: Blair Witch 2 and Signs. He also had a brief role in Men in Black 3, and appeared as Jack Crow in Jim Mickles 2014 adaptation of Cold in July. Other film appearances include Winter People, Millers Crossing, Blood In Blood Out, Tom and Huck and Home Fries while television roles include guest appearances on The Equalizer, New York News and White Collar as well as a two-episode stint on The Education of Max Bickford as Whammo.

Flaherty was a graduate of Pontotoc High School, and attended University of Southern Mississippi after high school. He resided in New York City. Flaherty died following surgery in February 2024, at the age of 81.

== Filmography ==
=== Film ===
Year	Title	Role	Notes
1989	Winter People	Gudger Wright	
1990	Miller's Crossing	Terry	
1991	The Ballad of the Sad Café	Merlie Ryan	
1993	Sommersby	Buck	
1993	Blood In Blood Out	Big Al	
1994	Natural Born Killers	Earl	
1995	Someone Else's America	Guide	
1995	Waterworld	Trader	
1995	Tom and Huck	Emmett	
1997	A Simple Wish	Duane	
1998	Home Fries	Red Jackson	
2000	Double Parked	Louie	
2000	Maze	Drunk	
2000	Book of Shadows: Blair Witch 2	Sheriff Cravens	
2002	Signs	Mr. Nathan	
2010	Forged	Tom	
2010	All Good Things	Rooming House Landlord	
2012	Men in Black 3	Obadiah Price	
2014	Cold in July	Jack Crow	

=== Television ===
Year	Title	Role	Notes
1984	The Edge of Night	Sheriff Mungard	Episode #1.7213
1986	The Equalizer	Policeman #2	Episode: "The Cup"
1988	The Dirty Dozen: The Fatal Mission	Sgt. Butts	Episode: "Danko's Dozen"
1988	The Days and Nights of Molly Dodd	Guard	Episode: "Here's a Reason to Keep Your Goats in the Barn"
1988	Home at Last	Slater	Television film
1989	Lonesome Dove	Soupy Jones	4 episodes
1989	The Cosby Show	George	Episode: "The Day the Spores Landed"
1991	Mathnet	Kaboom Pickens	Episode: "The Case of the Calpurnian Kugel Caper"
1995	New York News	Techie	Episode: "You Thought the Pope Was Something"
1999, 2000	Third Watch	Wink / Drunk #1	2 episodes
2000	Homicide: The Movie	Homeless Man	Television film
2001, 2002	The Education of Max Bickford	Whammo	2 episodes
2005	The Exonerated	Southern Cop #1	Television film
2009	White Collar	Motel Clerk	Episode: "Pilot"
2013	Alpha House	Man #2	Episode: "Zingers"
2020	Little America	Cowboy Hat Customer	Episode: "The Cowboy"
