= Cold in July =

Cold in July may refer to:

- Cold in July (novel), a 1989 crime novel
- Cold in July (film), a 2014 American crime drama
