= Izzie's Way Home =

- DVD cover
- Directed by: Sasha Burrow
- Written by: Camille Licate; Hank Woon, Jr.
- Produced by: Paul Bales; David Michael Latt; David Rimawi; Ron Thornton; Dylan Vox
- Starring: Bonnie Dennison; Tori Spelling; Zack Ward; Joey Fatone
- Production company: The Asylum
- Distributed by: The Asylum
- Release date: May 17, 2016
- Running time: 75 minutes
- Country: United States
- Language: English

Izzie's Way Home is a 2016 American animated fantasy adventure film produced by The Asylum. It is The Asylum's first animated feature and is considered a knockoff of the 2016 Pixar Animation Studios film Finding Dory and the 2003 prequel Finding Nemo.

== Plot ==
Izzie is a fish who lives with her father Harold in an aquarium, and is frequently bullied by the other fish in the vicinity. Harold tries to protect Izzie from being returned to the ocean by the human who maintains the aquarium, as that very event is what separated them from Izzie's mother. Izzie and Harold do end up being returned to the sea, and are separated during the eruption of an underwater volcano. A boat holding the aquarium tips over, causing the other fish to spill into the waters. Izzie befriends the other fish as she and her father search for one another.

== Cast ==
- Bonnie Dennison as Izzie, a young female purple queen anthias
- Tom Virtue as Harold, Izzie's father, and Jimmy, an octopus
- Tori Spelling as April, a canary rockfish
- Zack Ward as Thurston, a British-accented silver moonfish
- Joey Fatone as Carl, a sea cucumber
- Dawn Richard as Ginger, Carmel and Marcie, a trio of goldfish
- Lynne Marie Stewart as Clara, Izzie's mother, and Beatrice, a goblin shark
- Camille Licate as June, a pot-bellied seahorse, and Mona, an elderly green moray
- Paul M. Walker as Seymour, a blobfish
- Kim Little as Kristin, a sunset anthias

== Reception ==
Donna Rolfe of Dove.org gave the film a positive review, describing it as a family film with a message about being true to oneself and awarded it the Dove "Family-Approved" Seal for all ages.

CG Animated Review found that while the film was not great, it was better than expected and represented a good effort for The Asylum's first animated feature.

Andrea Beach of Common Sense Media gave the film one star out of five. She criticized its low-budget animation, repetitive story and dialogue, confusing backgrounds, poor mouth animation, and resemblance to Finding Nemo, describing the film as boring and lifeless.
