= Bonnie Dennison =

American actress

- Occupation: Actress
- Years active: 2001–present

Bonnie Dennison is an American actress. From 2002 to 2005, she played Emily Yokas on the NBC television show Third Watch. In 2007, she joined the cast of the long-running CBS daytime drama Guiding Light in the role of Susan "Daisy" Lemay, a role she continued to portray until the end of Guiding Light's broadcast run in 2009.

In 2009, she made a guest appearance in the Ugly Betty episode "Backseat Betty", portraying Ava, a cheerleader at school with Justin. In 2010, she appeared in the movie Stake Land. She has also appeared in commercials for Dannon DanActive, Losethezits.com, and Verizon Wireless.

In 2014, she was cast as one of the leads in a Fox comedy pilot executive produced by Matt Hubbard and Tina Fey, portraying the role of Thena; but the series was later scrapped after a change in management at Fox.

In early 2019, Dennison was cast as Jenny Kenney, the protagonist's daughter in the pilot of the hit CBS series Carol's Second Act starring Patricia Heaton. Following the pilot, Ashley Tisdale replaced Dennison in the role of Jenny.

== Filmography ==
Year	Title	Role	Notes
2001	100 Center Street	Jessica Hoffman	Episode: "Bottlecaps"
2002	Law & Order: Special Victims Unit	Heather Porter	Episode: "Justice"
2002	Law & Order	Katie Zwybel	Episode: "Slaughter"
2002	The Education of Max Bickford	Hannah Grunwald	
2002–05	Third Watch	Emily Yokas	Recurring cast (season 4), Main cast (seasons 5–6): 45 episodes
2006	Love/Death/Cobain	Brett Ashley	Short film
2007	Black Irish	Maria	Film
2007–09	Guiding Light	Daisy Lemay	Main cast
2009	Ugly Betty	Ava	Episode: "Backseat Betty"
2010	Stake Land	Peggy	Film
2011	Criminal Minds: Suspect Behavior	Reagan	Episode: "Smother"
2011	Born Bad	Brooke	Direct-to-DVD film
2011	NCIS	Lindsay	Episode: "Restless"
2012	Built for Two	Sadie	Short film
2013	Beneath	Kitty	Film
2013	The Maid's Room	Alice	Film
2014	Cabot College	Thena	TV pilot
2014	Break Up Call	Bonnie(?)	Short film; also writer and director (with Alison Barton)
2014	The Tangled Webs We Type	Bonnie	Short film; also writer and director (with Alison Barton)
2015	Landon Rob Sketch Show	various	Episode: "The Dad Bod"
2015	Ken Jeong Made Me Do It	Molly	MTV TV pilot
2016	Izzie's Way Home	Izzie (voice)	Animated film
2017	Stake Land II: The Stakelander	Peggy	
2017	Training Day	Lara	Episode: "Trigger Time"
2017	The Ranch	Rachel	Episode: "Much Too Young (To Feel This Damn Old)"
2019	Bombshell	Mercede	Film
2020	Brown Bagger	Ashley	Short film; also writer and director (with Alison Barton)
2020	Manifest	—N/a	Short film; writer and director (with Alison Barton)
2022	Pull Out	—N/a	Short film; director
2026	Ride or Die	—N/a	Wrote episode: "Moonlight on the Bosphorus" (with Alison Barton and Katherine Kearns)
