= Connor Paolo =

American actor (born 1990)

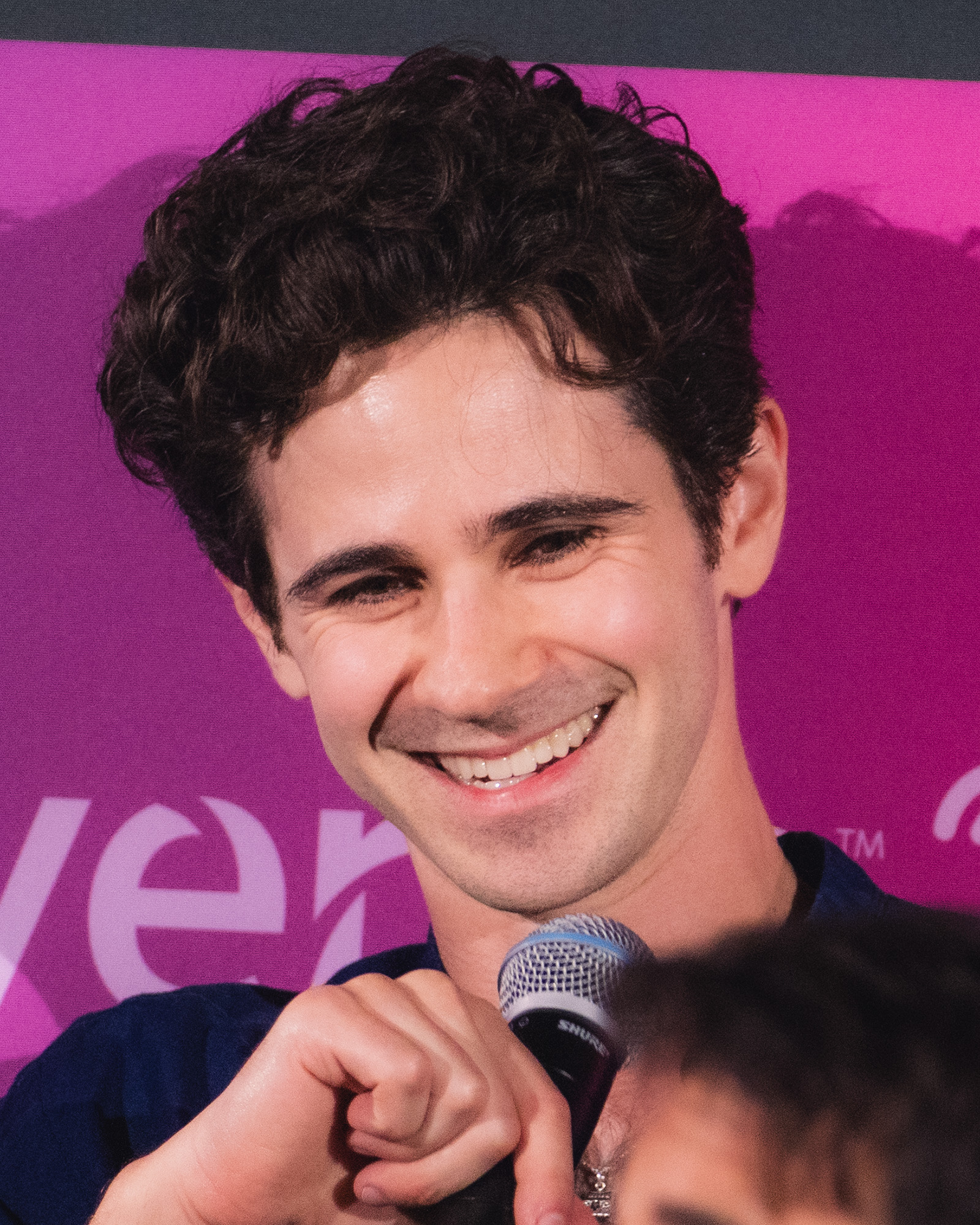
- Paolo in 2026
- Born: July 11, 1990 (age 36); New York City, U.S.
- Occupation: Actor
- Years active: 2002–present

Connor Paolo (born July 11, 1990) is an American actor. He is known for his roles as Eric van der Woodsen on the CW's teen drama series Gossip Girl and Declan Porter on the ABC drama series Revenge. He has also appeared in two Oliver Stone films, Alexander (2004) and World Trade Center (2006).

== Personal life ==
Paolo was born in New York City, the son of Julia Mendelsohn, a vocal coach and classical pianist, and Colin Paolo, a writer and screenwriter.

He attended, beginning in 2006, the Professional Performing Arts School alongside Sarah Hyland, Paul Iacono and Taylor Momsen. He took acting classes at the Lee Strasberg Theatre and Film Institute. Paolo also attended Appel Farm Arts and Music Center Summer Arts Camp located in Elmer, New Jersey for several summers. He attended New York University for one semester in fall 2008.

== Career ==
Paolo played a preteen murderer-rapist in an episode of Law & Order: Special Victims Unit. In 2004, he was on One Life to Live as Travis O'Connell, a recurring character. Paolo also made a return appearance on Law & Order: Special Victims Unit, playing a disturbed teenager based on the real case of Justin Berry.

He made his motion picture debut in Clint Eastwood's Oscar-nominated Mystic River (2003), playing young Sean. Other films include World Trade Center for Oliver Stone in 2006; Snow Angels (2007), directed by David Gordon Green; and Favorite Son (2008), his first leading role.

Paolo has a background in theatre and commercials. He has appeared on the Broadway stage in the hit musical The Full Monty.

In 2010, he starred in the vampire apocalypse film Stake Land directed by Jim Mickle.

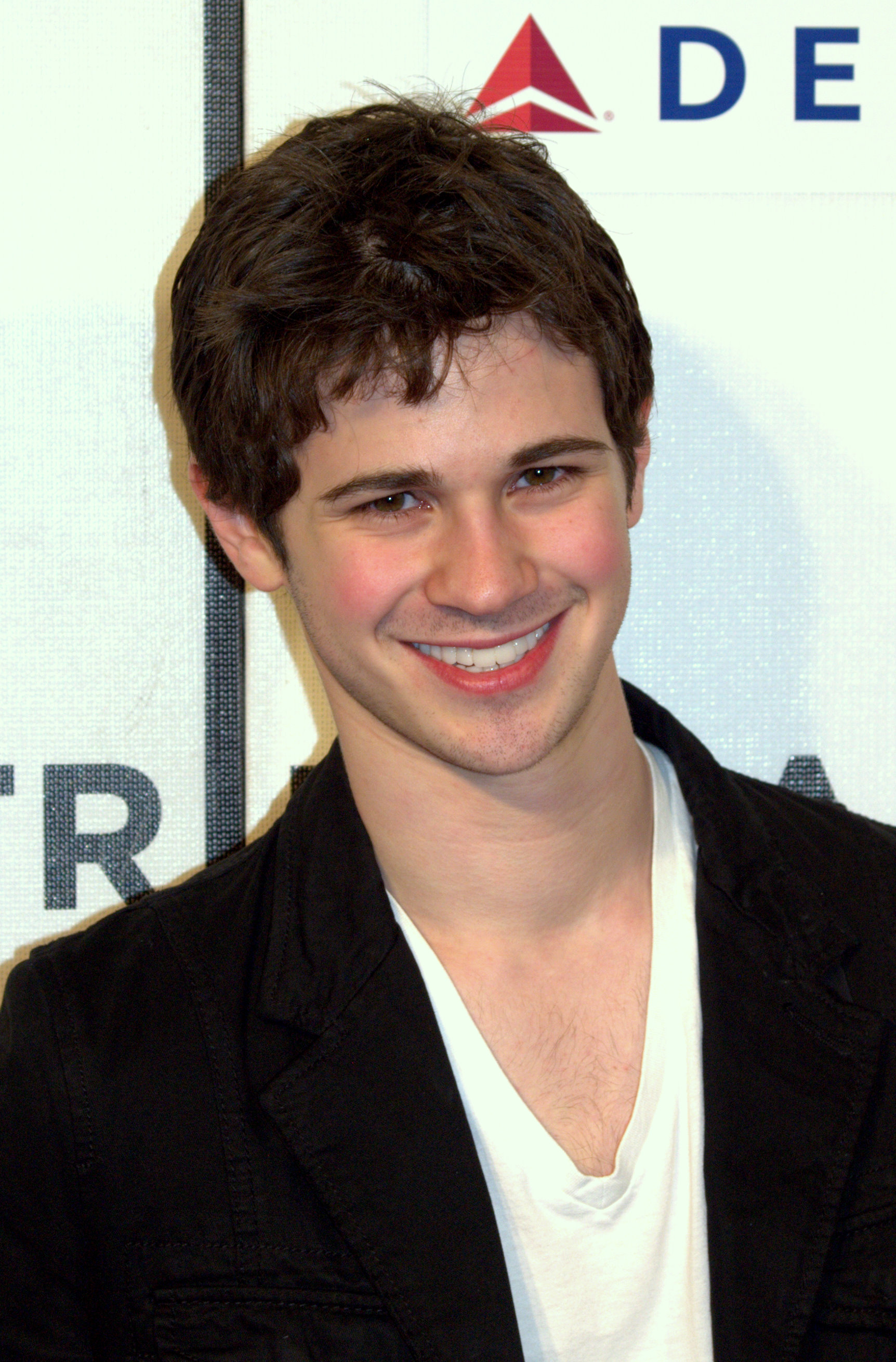
Connor Paolo in 2009.

From 2007 to 2011, Paolo had a supporting role on the CW television series Gossip Girl, where he played Eric van der Woodsen, the brother of lead character Serena van der Woodsen. His last regular appearance was in the sixth season.

In April 2011, Paolo joined the cast of ABC's dramatic series Revenge. In August 2011, Paolo stated that he would be taking on the new series Revenge full-time and his character Eric van der Woodsen on Gossip Girl would no longer appear on the show. He, however, returned to Gossip Girl for a brief appearance during the series finale. Paolo exited Revenge in May 2013, after his character was written off the second season finale.

In 2020, Variety announced Paolo was joining the cast of the Chris Blake quarantine comedy Distancing Socially. The film was shot at the height of the COVID-19 pandemic in 2020, using remote technologies and the iPhone 11. The film was acquired and released by Cinedigm in October 2021.

== Filmography ==
=== Film ===
Year	Title	Role	Notes
2003	Mystic River	Young Sean Devine	
2004	Alexander	Young Alexander	
2006	World Trade Center	Steven McLoughlin	Nominated—Best Performance in a Feature Film – Supporting Young Actor
2007	Snow Angels	Warren Hardesky	
2008	Favorite Son	Ross	
2009	The Winning Season	Damon	
2010	Camp Hell	Jack	
2010	Stake Land	Martin	
2016	Friend Request	Kobe	
2016	Like Lambs	Mick Springfield	
2016	Outlaw	Connor	
2016	Stake Land II: The Stakelander	Martin	
2017	Flock of Four	Tony Pacarelli	
2021	Distancing Socially	Paul	
2023	Fire Island	Troy	
2023	Ambush	Ackerman	
2023	The Young Wife	Geoffrey	
2025	Chapter 51	The Critic	
TBA	Viral		Post-production
TBA	Better Half		Post-production

=== Television ===
Year	Title	Role	Notes
2002	Law & Order: Special Victims Unit	Zachary Connor	Episode: "Juvenile"
2004	One Life to Live	Travis O'Connell	16 episodes
2006	Law & Order: Special Victims Unit	Teddy Winnock	Episode: "Web"
2007–2012	Gossip Girl	Eric van der Woodsen	Recurring (seasons 1–4); special guest (season 6 episode 10: "New York, I Love You XOXO")
2010	Mercy	Everett Cone	Episode: "I Did Kill You, Didn't I?"
2011	Stake Land: Origins	Martin	Episode: "Martin"
2011–2013	Revenge	Declan Porter	Main cast (seasons 1–2)
2016	Rush Hour	Henry	Episode: "Welcome Back, Carter"
2016	Swedish Dicks	Tim	Episode: "When Ingmar Met Axel"
2017	The Brave	Nate	Episode: "Break Out"
2017	Business Doing Pleasure	Jason	Season 1 episodes 1-6
2018	Electric Dreams	Ethan	Episode: "Safe & Sound"
2020	The Resident	Isaac Morgan	Episode: "Support System"
2025	Tracker	Gunther Becker	Season 3, episode 6: "Angel"

=== Video games ===
Year	Title	Role	Notes
2006	Bully	Tom Gurney	

=== Music videos ===
Year	Artist	Song
2012	The Pretty Reckless	"My Medicine"
2026	The Pretty Reckless	"When I Wake Up"
