= The Basics of Philosophy =

2026 American drama film

- Directed by: Paul Schrader
- Written by: Paul Schrader
- Produced by: Braxton Pope; David M. Wulf
- Starring: Jack Huston; Sofia Boutella; Daniel Zovatto; Bill Pullman; Dana Delany; Shiloh Fernandez; Karl Glusman
- Cinematography: Sean Price Williams
- Music by: Eli Keszler
- Production companies: Paul Schrader Productions; Redline Entertainment; Sodium Fox
- Release date: September 4, 2026 (Venice)
- Running time: 94 minutes
- Country: United States
- Language: English

The Basics of Philosophy is a 2026 American drama film written and directed by Paul Schrader. It stars Jack Huston, Sofia Boutella, Daniel Zovatto, Bill Pullman, and Dana Delany.

The film had its world premiere out of competition at the 83rd Venice International Film Festival on September 4, 2026.

== Cast ==
- Jack Huston as Dr. John Jorrisen
- Sofia Boutella as Rebecca Richards
- Daniel Zovatto as Miguel Vasque
- Bill Pullman as Melvyn Jorrisen
- Dana Delany as Gloria
- Shiloh Fernandez as Claude
- Karl Glusman as Baruch Spinoza
- Elizabeth Petruso as Chloe
- Richard Gere

== Production ==
In August 2024, it was announced that Paul Schrader would be writing and directing a drama film titled The Basics of Philosophy. Principal photography had wrapped in June 2025, when Jack Huston and Sofia Boutella were revealed to have joined the cast. In August 2025, more cast members were revealed including Daniel Zovatto, Bill Pullman, Dana Delany, Shiloh Fernandez, Karl Glusman, and Elizabeth Petruso. In August 2026, Martin Scorsese joined the film as executive producer.

Cast and crew at the 83rd Venice International Film Festival

== Release ==
The Basics of Philosophy premiered out of competition of the 83rd Venice International Film Festival on September 4, 2026.

== Reception ==
On review aggregator Rotten Tomatoes, the film holds an approval rating of 56% based on 16 reviews, with an average rating of 5/10. On Metacritic, the film has a weighted average score of 54 out of 100, based on 7 critics, indicating "mixed or average reviews".
