= Cold in July (film) =

- Theatrical release poster
- Directed by: Jim Mickle
- Written by: Nick Damici; Jim Mickle
- Based on: Cold in July by Joe R. Lansdale
- Produced by: Linda Moran; Rene Bastian; Adam Folk; Marie Savare
- Starring: Michael C. Hall; Sam Shepard; Vinessa Shaw; Nick Damici; Wyatt Russell; Don Johnson
- Cinematography: Ryan Samul
- Edited by: John Paul Horstmann; Jim Mickle
- Music by: Jeff Grace
- Production companies: BSM Studio; Belladonna Production; Backup Media; Paradise City
- Distributed by: IFC Films
- Release dates: January 18, 2014 (Sundance); May 23, 2014 (United States)
- Running time: 110 minutes
- Country: United States
- Language: English
- Box office: $427,418 (US)

Cold in July is a 2014 American independent Southern Gothic crime thriller film directed by Jim Mickle, written by Mickle and Nick Damici, and starring Michael C. Hall, Sam Shepard and Don Johnson. The film takes place in 1980s Texas and is based on the novel Cold in July by author Joe R. Lansdale. Hall plays a man who kills a burglar, whose father (Shepard) subsequently seeks revenge. The plot is further complicated when a private investigator (Johnson) shows up.

The project had a long gestation, and production did not begin until seven years after Mickle read the novel. Mickle and Damici had previously written about feminist themes in We Are What We Are (2013) and wanted to cover more masculine themes. Filming took place over 25 days in the Hudson Valley area of New York. It premiered at the 2014 Sundance Film Festival. IFC Films theatrically released the film in North America on May 23, 2014, where it grossed $427,418. It was released on DVD on September 30, 2014.

== Plot ==
In 1989 Laborde, Texas, Ann Dane, startled by the sound of a door window breaking, wakes her husband, Richard. He accidentally shoots the intruder, identified as Freddy Russel, a wanted felon. Richard is shaken by the experience. Richard visits the cemetery on the day of Freddy's burial where Freddy's father, Ben—a paroled convict—accosts Richard in his car, making a veiled reference to Richard's son, Jordan. Alarmed, Richard picks up Jordan from school and arranges for Ann to meet them at the police station. Though Ben follows him to his son's school, the police decline Richard's request for help. However, when the Danes arrive home to find their front door broken in, the family is put under police protection.

Police are posted around the house, including one guard inside, hoping to catch Ben when he returns. It turns out that Ben never left and has been hiding in the house's crawlspace since the initial break-in. He emerges and knocks out the guard, goes into Jordan's room, and locks the door. When Richard is alerted to Ben's presence inside the house by the sound of water dripping from the open crawlspace hatch, he alerts the observing police and breaks down Jordan's bedroom door. Ben has already escaped out the window and to a nearby river, however, and is tracked to Mexico—where he is apprehended. The police invite Richard to the station to close the case, and, while there, Richard notices a wanted poster for "Frederick Russel", who looks different from the man he shot. Richard repeatedly attempts to point out the contradiction to officer Ray Price, but Ray dismisses this as a trick of memory due to shock and refuses to discuss the issue.

Richard sees Ben taken away in an unmarked police car, which he follows. He sees the police forcibly remove Ben from the car, and inject him with an unknown substance, splash him with alcohol, and leave him on train tracks to die. Richard saves Ben from an approaching train. Ben at first does not believe Richard's claims that the man he shot was not Freddy. The two exhume Freddy's grave and Ben confirms that the body in the coffin is not his son. Ben notes that the man's finger tips have been cut off to prevent identification.

Ray visits Richard at work and claims that Freddy changed his appearance to avoid capture, explaining the discrepancy in the wanted poster. Richard is visited by Jim Bob Luke—a private investigator known by Ben—who says the name Fred Russell is tied to several widely circulated news stories about the killing of a burglar. Jim theorizes that after Freddy became involved with the Dixie Mafia, he was caught by Federal investigators, who faked Freddy's death and placed him in Witness Protection in exchange for information.

Jim, Richard, and Ben learn that Freddy might be living in Houston under the name "Frank Miller". When they attempt to meet him at his new home, they instead find a number of home videos which turn out to be snuff films, one of which features Freddy Russel beating a woman to death with a baseball bat. Richard wants to take the tape to the police. Jim believes the police already know about the videos but are unconcerned because Freddy is far more valuable as an informant against the Dixie Mafia while the victims are illegal immigrant prostitutes whom few will miss. Ben is so enraged by his son's actions that he is resolved to kill him at any cost.

They track Freddy to a remote mansion where he and his associates are making another snuff film. They infiltrate the mansion and begin killing everyone they encounter. When Freddy is the last survivor, Ben hesitates to kill him, and Jim is shot. Freddy shoots both Richard and Ben before Ben finally wounds him. Ben declares himself as Freddy's father, shoots his son in the head, and dies from his own wounds shortly after. Jim and Richard set the mansion ablaze and escape with the hostage. The next morning Richard returns home to his family.

== Cast ==
- Michael C. Hall as Richard Dane
- Sam Shepard as Ben Russel
- Don Johnson as Jim Bob Luke
- Vinessa Shaw as Ann Dane
- Nick Damici as Ray Price
- Wyatt Russell as Freddy Russel
- Lanny Flaherty as Jack Crow
- Rachel Zeiger-Haag as Valerie
- Brogan Hall as Jordan Dane

== Production ==
=== Development ===
Producers Linda Moran and Rene Bastian had an easier time of funding the film than Mickle's earlier work, as his reputation had grown; Moran said that they "worked on raising the money for this film for quite some time in every way we thought possible." B Media Global, a division of French company, Backup Media, fully financed Cold in July. It is the first film to be fully financed by Backup Media. Already a fan of Lansdale, Mickle turned to reading through his stack of Lansdale novels for pleasure. When he read through Cold in July in just a few hours, he excitedly realized that he had not seen these elements in a film before and looked to adapt it. Mickle said the film was difficult to pitch due to how it constantly evolves and re-invents itself. In order to reassure financiers, Mickle described Korean thrillers that had succeeded with similar shifts in tone, but he says that he doubts that he convinced anyone.

Mickle stated that he had difficulty getting the film made—it took seven years from when he first read the novel. The first draft of the script, a verbatim copy of the novel, was 220 pages long; from there, Mickle and Damici edited the script down to a more manageable size. The final script was also the furthest from the novel, but they felt it was closest in spirit. Lansdale said that he saw all the revisions of the script except for the last and "felt respected through the entire process." Although the original book was not designed to be filmed, Lansdale said films had been a secondary influence on the story, and the story "certainly fits with film."

As they adapted the novella, they realized that their faithful scripts were much too long, which did not do justice to the novella's pacing and length. Eventually, they were able to edit it down by removing unnecessary dialog that could be replaced through body language. Changing the time period was never considered, as Mickle considered the themes of masculinity and manhood to come from a previous era that would not work in a more modern setting. Shepard also contributed to the script. Mickle and Damici had struggled with one particularly difficult scene and debated removing it entirely. When Shepard offered to rewrite it, Mickle gratefully accepted. Shepard returned with a single typewritten page and offered to run it by Damici, but Mickle said it was not necessary and accepted it as-is.

Mickle and Damici were drawn to Lansdale's cross-genre style, as their own films were also cross-genre. Although primarily known for their work in horror films, Damici and Mickle said that they were more interested in storytelling and making good films, and Damici said that they can return to making horror films at any time. Mickle used Hall's character to ground the film so that audiences would not feel lost as the film crossed genres. Mickle wanted to avoid obvious genre categorization and predictability, as he felt that genre films needed to be shaken up. Buyers had previously encouraged him to re-cut one of his films so that audiences could easily identify the genre, limited to six subgenres, in the first ten minutes. Mickle said their advice "blew [his] mind".

=== Pre-production ===
In September 2013, Sam Shepard, Don Johnson, and Vinessa Shaw joined Michael C. Hall, who had already been cast. Because he played a killer on Dexter, Hall said that the script quieted any concerns he had about being typecast. Cold in July was filmed after Dexter ended, and Hall was drawn to the role based on his desire to play a more normal character; Hall called the role therapeutic, as it allowed him to move on from playing the iconic serial killer Dexter Morgan. The role further appealed to Hall for his character's lack of control over his own life, which contrasted strongly with the self-assured and in-control Dexter.

Mickle cast Hall after having been a fan of both Six Feet Under and Dexter. Although Mickle had concerns that audiences would find Hall difficult to accept as an uncomplicated everyman, he believed Hall to be one of the best working actors. Hall further impressed Mickle with his off-screen personality, which was surprisingly normal and completely unlike his TV characters. Once Hall had been cast, Mickle said that the rest of the casting "fell in place from there." Mickle had reached out to Shepard seven years earlier but heard that Shepard was retiring from acting. After Hall had been cast, however, Mickle once again contacted Shepard. Shepard expressed interest in the script, and Moran suggested casting Don Johnson, who had impressed Mickle with his recent film roles. When he read the script, Johnson said he was "taken by how it had different rhythms and tempos", and he "didn't know what the hell was going to happen by page ten."

=== Filming and post-production ===
Mickle was influenced by Road House and the Korean drama Memories of Murder. After exploring feminist themes in We Are What We Are, Mickle wanted to explore more masculine themes in Cold in July. Mickle called Cold in July "the other side of the coin" to We Are What We Are; and a film about being "sucked into your own kind of action movie." Mickle tried to work in many 1980s themes and references to John Carpenter's work from that period. After his previous films, Mickle had tired of city-based productions and was looking for something less urban. Shooting began in Kingston, New York on July 29, 2013. Locations included Esopus, Woodstock, and other Hudson Valley settings. It was shot using a Red Epic camera. Lansdale spent two weeks on the set and said he "loved it". Filming took 25 days, which Hall called "refreshing" compared to his long run on a TV series.

Johnson based his character on a composite of people he knew. He did not read the source novel, as he wanted his performance to be based on the screenplay and untainted by echoes from the novel. Of Mickle, Johnson said that he was quickly impressed with the director's skill and enjoyed working with him. Hall finished his run on Dexter a week before filming began on Cold in July. Hall did not base his performance on Dexter, and he did not consciously think of parallels between Cold in July and Dexter during filming. Hall said that Mickle had a "welcoming, fun vibe" and was a "great leader", and he said that he would enjoy working with Mickle again.

Long-time collaborator Ryan Samul worked closely with Mickle on the cinematography. They planned out the scenes in advance and used 3D graphics to visualize difficult shots. Cold in July was the first time Mickle worked with an editor instead of performing the job by himself. In an interview, he said that tight deadlines forced him to delegate the duties to a like-minded collaborator. He described it as "a weird experience" and an experiment. Mickle said that he never before had to cut scenes from his films during editing, but Cold in July was "a constant balance of shifting things, removing sub plots, and putting them back in different places." The score was composed by Jeff Grace. Mickle and Grace had collaborated on several films previously, and they had earlier planned what kind of score they wanted for Cold in July. It was influenced by John Carpenter's scores. Samuel Zimmerman of Fangoria also describes an influence from Sam Peckinpah's 1980s work. Lansdale's daughter, musician Kasey Lansdale, appears on the soundtrack.

== Release ==
This film made its premiere and competed in the 2014 Sundance Film Festival. IFC Films announced that they acquired North American rights to the film in a deal estimated at $2 million, and they released the theatrical and video on demand through IFC "movies on the same day as theatrical release" May 23, 2014. It grossed $40,317 on its opening weekend and $427,418 total in North America. Icon Productions released it in the UK, where it grossed another $682,258. The film was selected to be screened as part of the Directors' Fortnight section of the 2014 Cannes Film Festival. MPI Home Video released it on home video in the United States on September 30, 2014. Video sales grossed $525,260 in North America.

== Reception ==
Rotten Tomatoes, a review aggregator, reports that Cold in July received positive reviews from 84% of 116 critics surveyed; the average rating was 7/10. The consensus is: "Boasting plenty of twists, a suitably seedy tone, and a memorable supporting turn from Don Johnson, Cold in July proves an uncommonly rewarding thriller." Metacritic rated it 73/100 based on 30 reviews.

David Rooney of The Hollywood Reporter wrote, "Jim Mickle continues to show that he's among the most distinctive genre filmmakers on the indie scene with this cracked but flavorful thriller." Film Threat's Brian Tallerico rated it 3.5/5 and wrote, "Any issues with the actual narrative fall away when one considers the risk-taking here." Andrew O'Hehir of Salon.com called it "tense, gripping, gruesome, often hilarious, brilliantly engineered and highly satisfying". At Twitch Film, Todd Brown called it "a remarkable bit of work from one of the brightest lights on the American indie scene". Rodrigo Perez of Indiewire wrote that the film is initially irritating and contrived, but it becomes "far better than it has any right to be and perhaps, more significantly, is unusually absorbing and memorable". Scott Foundas of Variety described it as "a modest, unpretentious exercise in old-fashioned thrills and chills, made with a level of care and craft that elevates it well above the fray". Stephen Holden of The New York Times called it a "pulpy neo-noir" film that "goes gleefully haywire". Betsy Sharkey of the Los Angeles Times wrote, "Tense and violent, it grabs you from the first moments and rarely loosens its hold until the last body drops." Writing in Slant Magazine, Ed Gonzalez rated it 2.5/4 stars and called it a "compulsively watchable" film that eventually "falls into a rabbit hole of tiresome plot machinations". A. A. Dowd of The A.V. Club rated it B− and wrote that it "thrillingly shuffles genres, before settling on a dumb one". Although he criticized the frequent shifts in tone, Mark Kermode of The Guardian rated it 3/5 stars and praised the film's attention to detail. Noel Murray of The Dissolve rated it 3.5/5 and wrote that though the film is unpredictable, it has little new to say.
