= Beneath (2013 film) =

- Theatrical release poster
- Directed by: Larry Fessenden
- Written by: Tony Daniel; Brian D. Smith
- Produced by: Larry Fessenden; Peter Phok
- Starring: Daniel Zovatto; Bonnie Dennison; Chris Conroy; Jonny Orsini; Griffin Newman; Mackenzie Rosman; Mark Margolis
- Cinematography: Gordon Arkenberg
- Edited by: Lois J. Drabkin
- Music by: Will Bates
- Production companies: Chiller Films; Glass Eye Pix
- Distributed by: Chiller; Shout! Factory
- Release date: May 3, 2013 (Stanley Film Festival)
- Running time: 90 minutes
- Country: United States
- Language: English
- Budget: $1 million

Beneath is a 2013 horror film directed by Larry Fessenden. The film had its world premiere at the Stanley Film Festival on May 3, 2013, and later aired on the Chiller channel. Beneath stars Daniel Zovatto, Bonnie Dennison, and Chris Conroy as teenagers who must fight for their lives against a giant man-eating catfish.

A digital comic based upon the movie was released in later the same year in July. The comic, also titled Beneath, explores the backstory behind the catfish and details people it attacked, including another group that the giant fish attacked in the 1960s.

== Plot ==
Six high school seniors head out to a secluded lake for a last day together. The group consists of Johnny, Zeke, Kitty, her friend Deb, Kitty's boyfriend Matt, and Simon, Matt's brother. While at the lake, Johnny meets up with Mr. Parks, a friend of his grandfather, who warns him to be careful while in the lake. Although Johnny assures him that he will show respect, he fails to convince the others as they cause disturbances while in the boat.

Eventually, they begin to feel an unknown object touching them underwater. They attempt to row back to shore but lose an oar in the water. As Deb reaches out to retrieve it, a giant fish bites her, causing her to bleed to death. The group frantically tries to row to shore with one oar but the giant fish bites and destroys their remaining oar. In desperation, they throw Deb's body overboard to distract the fish, but this fails, leaving the group stranded on the lake.

Kitty accuses Johnny of knowing about the fish because he tried earlier to give her a necklace for protection. After Zeke attempts to persuade the group to throw Johnny overboard, Johnny jumps in the lake and disappears with the fish following him. Hysterical and desperate, Zeke is thrown overboard by an enraged Matt after Zeke accuses Kitty of sleeping with both brothers. He is soon eaten alive by the fish with his GoPro recording the ordeal. Johnny, having made it to shore, sets off in a motor boat to rescue the group. He attempts to tie a rope to tow the boat to safety, but the fish bumps the boat causing it to spin with the rope tying around Johnny's neck. Kitty tries to cut the rope, but he dies.

Kitty, Matt and Simon throw Johnny's body into the water as a distraction, but surprisingly, the fish refuses to eat him. The trio argue about Zeke's earlier insinuations regarding Kitty, and Matt angrily throws her into the lake. Kitty is denied entry on the boat, and she swims off. In a fit of madness, the brothers fight, and both end up falling into the water. Simon suffers a head injury, leaving drops of blood that attracts the fish. Matt tries to help his brother, but is kicked by Simon into the fishes path and is eaten while Simon swims to shore.

Meanwhile, Kitty observes Johnny's body floating nearby as she sits on the overturned motorboat. She takes the necklace off him and the fish immediately attacks Johnny's corpse. Believing the necklace will protect her, Kitty manages to swim back to the shore. However, she is confronted by a psychotic Simon, who drowns her in the shallows despite her pleas.

As night descends, a bloodied Simon is met by Mr. Parks. Inquiring about Johnny, Simon replies that everyone is dead. Mr. Parks laments Johnny’s death and demands that Simon go back in the lake. When Simon refuses, he is shocked to see Mr. Parks holding a gun as well as Zeke's GoPro and says he knows what happened. He shoots at Simon several times until he goes back into the water. Simon tries to escape but is dragged underwater and devoured by the fish. Johnny's tooth necklace is seen on the shore of the lake bed, disappearing as the lake is covered with blood.

== Cast ==
- Bonnie Dennison as Kitty
- Daniel Zovatto as Johnny
- Jonny Orsini as Simon
- Chris Conroy as Matt
- Griffin Newman as Zeke
- Mackenzie Rosman as Deb
- Mark Margolis as Mr. Parks

== Production ==
Plans for Beneath were first officially announced in 2012, with Daniel Zovatto named as one of the film's lead roles. Filming took place during an 18-day period and Fessenden designed the fish himself, as he wanted it to resemble "a real fish and not like an evil creature". Fessenden experienced some difficulties shooting, as he and the other crew members only had small boats to shoot upon and that "any kind of company move took forever". He also greatly revised the script, removing several flashback scenes, in an attempt to "keep the drama within the claustrophobic boat".

== Reception ==
Critical reception for Beneath was predominantly negative, and Film School Rejects remarked that the movie was "what happens when indie directors have bills to pay". Dread Central compared Beneath to the 2003 movie The Room, saying that "both are seemingly oblivious in their outright terribleness". The Hollywood Reporter and RogerEbert.com gave more mixed reviews, with The Hollywood Reporter commenting that the movie was "efficiently shot, edited and scored" but that "otherwise it’s another of those depressing examples of bad movies happening to interesting directors."

On Rotten Tomatoes the film holds an approval rating of 35% based on 17 reviews, with an average rating of 4.9/10. On Metacritic, the film has a rating of 40 out of 100 based on 8 critics, indicating "mixed or average" reviews.
