= Daniel Zovatto =

Costa Rican actor (born 1991)

- Zovato in 2026
- Born: Daniel Zovatto Blanco; June 28, 1991 (age 35); San José, Costa Rica
- Occupation: Actor
- Years active: 2013–present
- Spouse: Tara Holt (m. 2023)
- Children: 2

Daniel Zovatto Blanco (born June 28, 1991) is a Costa Rican and American film and television actor. Since 2012 he has starred in films of the horror genre: Beneath (2013), It Follows (2014), Don't Breathe (2016), The Pope's Exorcist (2023), Woman of the Hour (2023) as well as the romantic comedy Laggies (2014). Zovatto made his television debut in 2014, guest starring in an episode of Agents of S.H.I.E.L.D. He has since held recurring roles as Gideon LeMarchal in Revenge (2014), and Jack in Fear the Walking Dead (2016). In 2018 he appeared as one of the leads in HBO's Here And Now. He was then cast as the protagonist in Penny Dreadful: City of Angels which premiered in 2020.

== Early life and career ==
Daniel Zovatto Blanco was born on June 28, 1991 in San José, Costa Rica, the son of television personality Sylvia Blanco and named after his father, Daniel Zovatto Garetto, an Argentinian politician. Zovatto's desire to become an actor began early when he joined his mother on a set of her talk shows in Costa Rica. He attributes his fascination with the horror genre to his father, who scared him as a child while he was watching Stanley Kubrick's The Shining. Subsequently, he adopted the nickname 'Danny,' after the child protagonist of the horror film.

After moving to New York City, he pursued theater and was cast in two short films, 55 Days and The Return. He later moved to Los Angeles, where he made his feature film debut in the 2013 horror movie Beneath as Johnny. The independent film, released on May 3, 2013, was directed by Larry Fessenden and marked Zovatto's first leading role in a movie. Later that year, he starred as Neils Hirsch in the horror drama film Innocence, opposite Linus Roache and Stephanie March.

In 2014, Zovatto made his television debut in the season one episode of Agents of S.H.I.E.L.D., "Seeds". From May to October 2014, Zovatto had a 3-episode arc in ABC's soap opera drama series Revenge. His character, Gideon LeMarchal, dates Charlotte Grayson (Christa B. Allen) in the third and fourth seasons of the series. His next film project was the romantic comedy Laggies, in the role of Junior, alongside actors including Chloë Grace Moretz, Keira Knightley, and Mark Webber. This was followed with his breakthrough role in the 2014 supernatural horror film It Follows as Greg Hannigan. The film received critical acclaim.

Zovatto played a leading role in Don't Breathe, a horror film directed by Fede Álvarez, cast as the character Money. The film premiered on March 12, 2016, at the South by Southwest film festival and was released in the USA on August 26, 2016. Although set in Detroit, it was shot primarily in Hungary, with only a few views of the Detroit ruins shot in Detroit. In 2016, Zovatto landed a recurring role on AMC's horror drama series Fear the Walking Dead, during the show's second season. Although he does not appear in the premiere episode of season two, "Monster", Jack (Zovatto) is heard conversing with Alicia Clark (Alycia Debnam-Carey) after the latter responds to his distress calls over the radio. Debnam-Carey and Zovatto's characters share a romance in the succeeding episodes "Blood in the Streets" and "Captive", despite Jack and accomplices of his having kidnapped Clark and her stepfather. The same year, he appeared in an episode of the From Dusk till Dawn TV series as Tommy.

In 2017, Zovatto had smaller roles in film, appearing in Greta Gerwig's critically acclaimed Lady Bird, starring Saoirse Ronan, and Newness, starring Nicholas Hoult. He also appeared in an episode of Dimension 404 "Cinethrax" opposite Sarah Hyland.

Later, he was cast in one of the main roles in HBO's dark comedy-drama series Here And Now opposite Oscar winners Tim Robbins and Holly Hunter as Ramon, one of the adopted siblings of a multiracial family. Ramon was born in Colombia and adopted as a baby. He is in a relationship with free-spirited Henry (Andy Bean). The family begins to struggle as Ramon starts hallucinating and seeing the figures 11:11 constantly. The series premiered in February 2018 and was canceled by HBO after one season.

Zovatto returned to film with two independent movies, Vandal and Heavy. Vandal is the story of Nick Cruz, also known as "Damage," a young, highly talented graffiti writer and artist struggling to justify the world of illegal graffiti as he experiences loss, love, and the consequences he created for himself. The movie premiered on March 7, 2019, at the Miami Film Festival. Although the movie hasn't had a theatrical release, it received positive reviews, and Zovatto was invited to Variety's "10 Latinxs to Watch" brunch, held in partnership with the 36th annual Miami Film Festival, celebrating rising Latino filmmakers and actors.

In 2019, he appeared in revenge thriller Heavy opposite Sophie Turner which was set in New York. It centers on a drug-addicted, codependent couple, Maddie (Turner) and Seven (Zovatto), living it up in the high-end drug scene, leading to unavoidable tragedy. The film premiered at the 2019 Cannes Film Festival. Zovatto could not attend the ceremony because he was in Los Angeles filming John Logan's crime fantasy drama Penny Dreadful: City of Angels, where he plays the series' protagonist, Santiago "Tiago" Vega, a young Chicano detective struggling between two worlds: his love for his job with the LAPD and his love for his family and Mexican heritage in a brutally racist 1938 Los Angeles. Natalie Dormer stars as a demoness making racial violence worse. The series premiered in April 2020 on Showtime, and in August Showtime announced its cancellation.

He starred in the crime movie Flinch, which follows the story of Joe Doyle (played by Zovatto), a young hitman who develops feelings for Mia (played by Tilda Hervey), who witnesses a murder he committed. In 2021, Zovatto returned to the small screen for HBO's miniseries Station Eleven playing the role of a cult leader called “The Prophet”. In 2023, he co-starred opposite Russell Crowe in The Pope's Exorcist as Father Esquibel. The film received mixed reviews but was commercially successful and a sequel is in the works. On the set of The Pope's Exorcist, Crowe convinced Zovatto to accept the role of real life serial killer Rodney Alcala in Anna Kendrick's directorial debut Woman of the Hour. Kendrick was so impressed by his performance on Station Eleven that he was the only actor she wanted to play Alcala. The film received mostly positive reviews praising both Kendrick and Zovatto.

== Personal life ==
Zovatto married Tara Holt in 2023. They have two children, a daughter born in February 27, 2024 and a son born in January 13, 2026.

== Filmography ==
=== Film ===
Year	Title	Role	Notes
2013	Beneath	Johnny	
2013	Innocence	Neils Hirsch	
2014	Laggies	Junior	
2014	It Follows	Greg Hannigan	
2016	Don't Breathe	Money	
2017	Lady Bird	Jonah Ruiz	
2017	Newness	Oren	
2019	Vandal	Nick 'Damage' Cruz	
2020	Heavy	Seven	
2020	Flinch	Joe Doyle	
2023	The Pope's Exorcist	Father Esquibel	
2023	Woman of the Hour	Rodney Alcala	
2026	The Get Out	Rodriguez	
2026	Street Smart	Dillon	
2026	The Basics of Philosophy †	Miguel Vasque	Post-production
2027	The Last Druid †	TBA	Post-production
TBA	Famous †	TBA	Post-production

Key
†	Denotes films that have not yet been released

=== Television ===
Year	Title	Role	Notes
2014	Agents of S.H.I.E.L.D.	Seth Dormer	Guest; episode: "Seeds"
2014	Revenge	Gideon LeMarchal	Recurring; episodes: "Execution", "Renaissance", "Disclosure"
2016	Fear the Walking Dead	Jack	Recurring; episodes: "Monster", "Blood in the Streets", "Captive"
2016	The Deleted	Logan	Recurring
2017	Dimension 404	Zach	Episode: "Cinethrax"
2018	Here and Now	Ramón	Main cast
2019	Penny Dreadful: City of Angels	Detective Tiago Vega	Main cast
2021–2022	Station Eleven	Tyler Leander / The Prophet	Main cast, miniseries
