= Cat Chaser =

1989 film by Abel Ferrara

- DVD cover
- Directed by: Abel Ferrara
- Written by: Elmore Leonard; James Borelli
- Based on: Cat Chase (1982 novel) by Elmore Leonard
- Produced by: Peter S. Davis; William N. Panzer
- Starring: Peter Weller; Kelly McGillis
- Cinematography: Anthony B. Richmond
- Edited by: Anthony Redman
- Music by: Chick Corea
- Production company: Vestron Pictures
- Distributed by: Live Entertainment
- Release dates: October 20, 1989 (Portugal); October 12, 1991 (U.S.)
- Running time: 90 minutes
- Country: United States
- Language: English

Cat Chaser is a 1989 American heist film directed by Abel Ferrara and starring Peter Weller and Kelly McGillis. The screenplay by Elmore Leonard and James Borrelli is based on Leonard's 1982 novel. It follows a veteran of the Dominican Republic intervention who becomes involved with the wife of a corrupt Dominican general, and sets out to steal $2 million from him. The score was composed by jazz fusion musician Chick Corea.

The film was originally planned for a theatrical release, but due to Vestron Pictures' financial troubles it was released direct-to-video in the United States. Ferrara and Weller expressed disappointment with the final film, claiming it was re-edited against their wishes.

== Plot ==
George Moran is a former Marine and veteran of the Dominican Republic intervention who now runs a small beachfront motel in Miami. While searching for a Dominican woman named Luci Palma who saved his life in 1965 (and gave him the nickname "Cat Chaser"), he begins a relationship with Mary DeBoya, the wealthy, unhappy wife of a sadistic former Dominican general. Moran gets involved in a plot by fellow military veteran Nolen Tyner and a former New York policeman, Jiggs Scully, to rip off the general. Moran must elude a number of double-crosses as he and Mary attempt to gain her freedom plus $2 million of the general's money.

== Cast ==
- Peter Weller as George Moran
- Kelly McGillis as Mary DeBoya
- Charles Durning as "Jiggs" Scully
- Frederic Forrest as Nolen Tyner
- Tomás Milián as Andres DeBoya
- Juan Fernández de Alarcon as Rafi
- Kelly Jo Minter as Loret
- Phil Leeds as Jerry Shea
- Tony Bolano as Corky
- Adrianne Sachs as Anita DeBoya
- Roberto Escobar as Mario Prado
- Maria M. Ruperto as Luci Palma
- Victor Rivers as Emiliano Mendoza
- Alexis Arguello as Pepe Mendoza
- Mary-Robin Redd as Felicia

== Production ==
The film was shot in Old San Juan, Puerto Rico and Miami and Coral Gables in Florida, as the crew decided shooting on location in Santo Domingo would be too dangerous and costly after scouting there.

Filming was not a happy experience for McGillis, who didn't make another major film afterwards for almost a decade. She said in 2001: "It was the most hateful experience of my life, and I said, if this is what acting is going to be, I will not do it. On the last day of shooting, I said to Abel 'Are you done with me?' He said, 'Yeah.' I walked in my trailer and shaved my head. I said 'Screw you, I never want to act again.'"

In a 2015 oral history of the making of Cat Chaser, written by Sam Weisberg of Hidden Films, Peter Weller and various crew members acknowledged that Weller and McGillis openly clashed during filming; Weller maintained that he never found out the reason for it. Several crew members confirmed that McGillis stormed off the set after shooting a love scene with Weller, but they differed on the exact cause of her outburst.

Abel Ferrara felt that the rape scene was too physical, so he wanted to have a body double shoot it. According to Ferrara, Kelly McGillis was very upset when she learned she wouldn't be shooting the scene. He said that McGillis accused him of replacing her because he didn't think she was beautiful enough. Eventually, McGillis and Ferrara worked out the scene in a way that she could film it herself. Ferrara claims that the actress essentially wrote the scene herself.

=== Re-editing ===
Ferrara clashed with Vestron executives during post-production over the film's length and content. His initial director's cut ran three-hours long, which was reduced to 90 minutes against his wishes. A voiceover narration, performed by actor Reni Santoni after Weller refused, was added.

The three-hour cut was screened at the Anthology Film Archives in New York City in the summer of 2014 with Ferrara in attendance, and again in 2026.

== Release ==
The film was opened in Portugal on October 20, 1989. Vestron Pictures's financial problems led them to cancel its planned American release.

=== Home media ===
The film was released on VHS tape in the United States in 1991 by Live Entertainment and the UK in 1994 by 4 Front and for the first time on DVD in 2003 by Lion's Gate/Artisan, and issued in the UK in 2004 by Arrow Films.

== Reception ==
=== Critical response ===
The film received mixed reviews. It currently has a 40% approval rating on Rotten Tomatoes, based on 5 reviews, with a weighted average of 4.85/10. Variety wrote: "Despite a fine cast and atmospheric direction by Abel Ferrara, the pic doesn't quite make the grade, though it certainly is worth a look." Entertainment Weekly called the film "baroquely sleazy" and wrote that it failed to make sense. The Roanoke Times described the film: "Despite some serious flaws, Cat Chaser is one of the better screen adaptations of an Elmore Leonard novel". Weller was criticized for his "stiff performance" by Mick Martin and Marsha Porter in The Video Movie Guide 1995.

=== Awards and nominations ===
Cat Chaser was nominated for the Best Film award at Mystfest in 1989.
