= Private Sessions (film) =

- Genre: Drama
- Written by: David Seltzer; Thom Thomas
- Directed by: Michael Pressman
- Starring: Mike Farrell; Kelly McGillis; Tom Bosley
- Music by: Lalo Schifrin
- Country of origin: United States
- Original language: English

Production
- Executive producers: Deanne Barkley; Philip Capice
- Producer: Thom Thomas
- Cinematography: Mike Fash
- Editor: Craig McKay
- Running time: 95 minutes
- Production companies: Raven's Claw Productions; Seltzer-Gimbel Productions; Comworld Productions

Original release
- Network: NBC
- Release: March 18, 1985

Private Sessions is a 1985 American made-for-television drama film directed by Michael Pressman. Starring Mike Farrell as New York therapist Dr. Joe Braden, with Kelly McGillis and Tom Bosley as Jennifer Coles and Harry O'Reilly, two of his patients with different problems, the film was originally a television pilot, that failed to impress the audience and was never picked up.

== Plot ==
Dr. Joe Braden is a therapist living and working in Manhattan, who also gives advice on the radio. His wife Claire has divorced him six months earlier and he still has not processed the emotional impact this has had on him. When their teenaged daughter Millie learns that Claire is dating a new man, a goofy writer named Quentin Byrd, Millie neglects her school work in order to set Joe up with a woman. She encourages him to allow his gym buddy Jerry Sharma to set him up a blind date with a woman named Tippi. Even though they both like each other, Joe soon concludes that he is not ready to date again and cannot keep his mind from Millie. At his work, Joe is eventually bothered by Millie's guidance counselor Susan Prescott, whom he agrees to date; announcing that he is finally ready to move on, going even as far as meeting Quentin.

At his work, Joe meets up with colleague Dr. Liz Bolger regularly to discuss his patients. One of his latest patients Harry O'Reilly, is recently getting hallucinations while driving his cab through the city. His wife Rosemary pushes him to visit Joe for advice, which Harry agrees to reluctantly. Over the next couple of sessions, Harry improves his social tactics and finally becomes a good acquaintance of Joe: most of their sessions take place in his cab during work. Harry even goes as far as inviting Joe to attend his son Johnny's wedding in a few days. Joe cannot figure out why Harry is bothered with such hallucinations and comes up with the most difficult theories; Dr. Bolger eventually advises him not to think so difficult. It is eventually found out that Harry is a normal guy who was behaving strangely due to toxic poison from the new carpeting in his cab.

Joe's main focus is patient Jennifer Coles, the daughter of a wealthy businessman Oliver and his loyal but distant wife. Jennifer is a nymphomaniac who is sleeping with random strangers from the street, despite a serious relationship with struggling actor Rick. Oliver disapproves of Rick, feeling as if he is only going after her wealth and wishes for her to be with someone such as an old friend from Harvard, Paul Rogers. Jennifer is introduced to the married Paul and sleeps with him in a hotel room the next day. Paul offers to meet up again but Jennifer is not interested. Feeling as if she is not worthy of most men she meets, including Rick, and aware that she is destroying her health and personal life by sleeping with a lot of men, she agrees to see Joe.

Initially, Jennifer uses her sexuality to test Dr. Braden but he is unaffected by her seductive behavior. One day, she becomes emotional when Rick reveals that he has been offered a steady acting job in San Diego and wants her to move with him to California; something she is not willing to do. Minutes later, she invites a delivery boy into her bed, though changes her mind as he kisses her. The delivery boy does not listen to her struggling and rapes her. Rick finds Jennifer physically assaulted in their home and she reveals that she has been unfaithful to him.

Simultaneously, Joe finds out that Jennifer is acting out because she has been molested by someone as a child. He invites her parents to a session but they are reluctant to work with Joe. Jennifer reveals that she was molested as a 9-year-old and confided in her parents but they feared that the scandal might hurt their career and told Jennifer that she was lying. During the session, Oliver is unamused with Jennifer digging up the past and speaks of his intentions of putting her in a mental hospital. He eventually leaves the session prematurely, thereby abandoning Jennifer. Mrs. Coles apologizes for everything that has happened in the past and leaves as well. Jennifer bursts out in tears but thanks Joe for having helped her with coming to terms with her past. Following a conversation with Joe, Rick agrees to give his relationship with Jennifer another try.

== Cast ==
- Mike Farrell as Dr. Joe Braden
- Kelly McGillis as Jennifer Coles
  - Eevin Hartsough as Young Jennifer Coles
- Tom Bosley as Harry O'Reilly
- Maureen Stapleton as Dr. Liz Bolger
- Denise Miller as Angie
- Kathryn Walker as Claire Braden
- Mary Tanner as Millie Braden
- David Labiosa as Ramon
- Robert Vaughn as Oliver Coles
- Greg Evigan as Rick
- Hope Lange as Mrs. Coles
- Kim Hunter as Rosemary O'Reilly
- Victor Garber as Jerry Sharma
- John Cunningham as Paul Rogers
- Elias Koteas as Johnny O'Reilly
- Wendie Malick as Tippi
- Paul Land as Delivery Boy
- Davenia McFadden as Gail
- Edmund Genest as Quentin Byrd
- Kathryn Dowling as Susan Prescott
