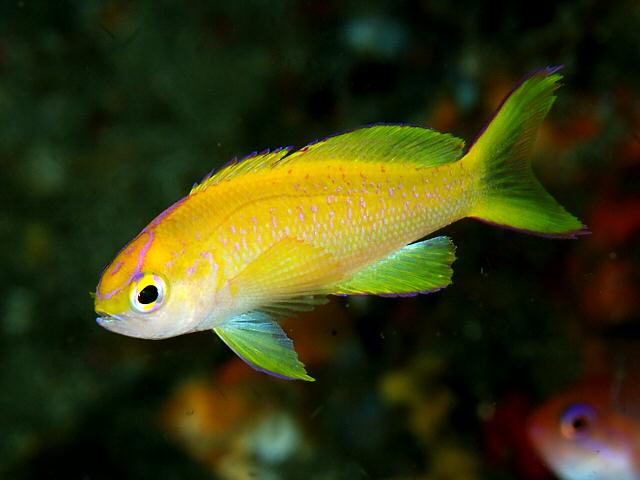

Conservation status
- Least Concern (IUCN 3.1)

Scientific classification
- Kingdom: Animalia
- Phylum: Chordata
- Class: Actinopterygii
- Order: Perciformes
- Family: Anthiadidae
- Genus: Pseudanthias
- Species: P. parvirostris

Binomial name
- Pseudanthias parvirostris (Randall & Lubbock, 1981)

Synonyms
- Anthias parvirostris Randall & Lubbock, 1981

= Pseudanthias parvirostris =

Species of fish

Pseudanthias parvirostris, the sunset anthias is a species of marine ray-finned fish in the subfamily Anthiinae of the family Serranidae, the groupers and sea basses. It is found in the Indo-West Pacific Ocean. It occasionally makes its way into the aquarium trade. It grows to a size of 7.5 cm in length.

== Description ==
Pseudanthias parvirostris has a somewhat elongated, moderately compressed body which is around 3 times as long (in standard length as it is deep. The males have a thickened upper lip which is a little pointed and can be moved up and down, although this is less marked in this species than in related Pseudanthias. It has a moderately large, obliquely angled mouth in which the maxilla extends to the level of or beyond the rear edge of the eye. The lateral line is curved and follows the curve of the dorsal profile. The dorsal fin has 10 spines and 15-16 soft rays and the anal fin has 3 spines and 7 soft rays. The upper third of the body is yellowish in colour in males while the rest of the body is pinkish and there is a magenta stripe which runs between their eyes and from the upper margin of the eyes to the origin of the dorsal fin. The dorsal fin and lobes of the caudal fin are magenta. The females are overall yellow, sometimes a darker yellowish-orange, with a similar magenta stripe between the eyes as the male. It grows to a maximum standard length of 7.5 centimetres (3.0 in).

== Distribution ==
Pseudanthias parvirostris is found in the Indian Ocean and the Western Pacific Ocean. Its range extends from Japan south as far as Australia, west to the Madives and east to the Solomon Islands. In Australia it is found in the Coral Sea and at Rowley Shoals in Western Australia.

== Habitat and biology ==
Pseudanthias parvirostris is found on outer reef slopes at depths between 35 and 65 metres (115 and 213 ft), most commonly at depths of more than 40 metres (130 ft). They are usually found in small aggregations close to the bottom, where there are patch reefs on slopes dominated by sand or rubble. The social grouping is that there is a dominant male which guards a harem made up of a small group of females. They are nonadric protogynous hermaphrodites and when the dominant male is lost the most dominant female changes sex and colour to that of the male. which takes around two weeks, and takes over the harem/ Where they are sympatric P. parvirostris may mix with groups of Pseudanthias smithvanizi.

== Taxonomy ==
Pseudanthias parvirostris was first formally described as Anthias parvirostris by John E. Randall and Roger Lubbock in 1981 with the type locality given as the outer reef slope on the western side of Alite Reef, off Malaita in the Solomon Islands. The specific name parvirostris refers to the relatively small snout developed by the males of this species. Some authorities classify this species within the subgenus Mirolabrichthys, and also that it is intermediate between that subgenus and the subgenus Pseudanthias.

== Utilisation ==
Pseudanthias parvirostris is rare in the aquarium trade, although they are among the easier Pseudanthias species to keep, although as they are relatively deep water fish they require dimly lit aquaria.
