= Cold in July (novel) =

1989 novel by Joe R. Lansdale

- Paperback edition
- Author: Joe R. Lansdale
- Language: English
- Genre: Fiction novel
- Publisher: Mark V. Ziesing
- Publication date: 1989
- Publication place: United States
- Media type: Print hardcover
- Pages: 234 pp.
- ISBN: 0-929-480-20-1
- Preceded by: The Nightrunners (1987)
- Followed by: Tarzan: The Lost Adventure (1995)

Cold in July is a 1989 American crime novel written by Joe R. Lansdale.

A feature film adaptation starring Michael C. Hall was released in 2014.

== Plot summary ==
Richard Dane awakens to find an intruder in his home and has to kill in self-defense. The problem is the intruder's father, Ben Russel, is a murderous ex-con bent on avenging his son's death. Richard, a small-time businessman, is in way over his head. Soon the two find out they're both being misled and manipulated and find themselves drawn into a web of psychopathic sex, violence, and corruption. It turns out that the man Richard killed was not Ben's son. So the two men join forces to learn both the identity of the man Richard shot and the fate of Ben's son.

== Editions ==
Cover of movie tie-in reissue

Originally this book was issued as a stand-alone novel and as a set with the first Hap and Leonard novel Savage Season published by Mark V. Ziesing. It has been re-issued as a paperback by Warner Books in 1995 and by Phoenix Publications in Great Britain in 1996. On May 5, 2014, Tachyon Publications has reissued this novel as a movie tie-in that included a foreword by the director of the film adaptation Jim Mickle.

== Film adaptation ==
B Media Global fully financed the 2014 film adaption of Cold in July, directed by Jim Mickle and with a screenplay written by Mickle and Nick Damici. Actors Michael C. Hall and Sam Shepard star, along with Don Johnson and Nick Damici. Filming began on July 29, 2013, in Kingston, New York.

Cold in July was released to positive reviews at the 2014 Sundance Film Festival, with an average rating of 7.7/10. It was released theatrically on May 23, 2014.
