= Stake Land II =

2016 film directed by Dan Berk & Robert Olsen

- Directed by: Dan Berk; Robert Olsen
- Written by: Nick Damici
- Produced by: Larry Fessenden; Greg Newman; Peter Phok
- Starring: Nick Damici; Connor Paolo; Laura Abramsen; A.C. Peterson; Steven Williams
- Cinematography: Matt Mitchell
- Edited by: Dan Berk; Robert Olsen
- Music by: Redding Hunter
- Release date: October 14, 2016 (Sitges)
- Running time: 81 minutes
- Country: United States
- Language: English

Stake Land II (also known as Stake Land II: The Stakelander or The Stakelander) is a 2016 American vampire horror film directed by Dan Berk and Robert Olsen and starring Nick Damici, who wrote the script. It is a sequel to Stake Land (2010).

== Plot ==
Martin, who had settled down with the woman he met at the climax of the first film, attempts to track down Mister after his wife and daughter are killed in an attack led by a scarred sentient female vampire. Martin eventually finds him after being forced by cannibals into fighting him. Mister recognizes Martin and together they escape from the cannibals while rescuing a feral girl. Mister, Martin and the feral girl find an abandoned house to stay the night but are later attacked by the cult from the first film. It is later revealed that they serve the scarred vampire and that they have been looking for Mister. The scarred vampire had killed Martin's family with the intent of using a vengeful Martin to find Mister. Martin, Mister, and the feral girl manage to escape and capture one of the younger cultists who tells them that he was forced into going along with the cult.

Mister's group bumps into another group, one of whom Mister recognizes as an old friend, they are then taken to their base where another of Mister's old friends helps him heal and recuperate. The cultist is locked in a small room, but later escapes after tricking a woman into thinking he had hanged himself and murders her. The cultist then alerts the rest of the cult and the vampires of the base's whereabouts. The base is attacked and Mister instantly recognizes the scarred vampire as a vampire he had attempted to kill in the past, only succeeding in scarring her. A flashback shows that the scarred vampire had given birth to a child who Mister killed. The base's defense holds, thanks in part to some flood lights powered by a generator, and the scarred vampire signals for her troops to retreat.

Knowing the scarred vampire and her troops will return, Mister and Martin, along with Mister's old friends try to buy time by combating the threat while the civilians evacuate. The feral girl is forced to go with the civilians but later escapes and tries to come back to Mister. The cult and vampires attack that night, this time using a suicide bomber to destroy the generator. Martin and Mister manage to kill the scarred vampire but Mister is wounded. Meanwhile, Mister's old friends get trapped in the kitchen but two of them sacrifice themselves by blowing themselves as well as several attackers up. Later while trying to escape and follow the civilians, a vampire approaches Martin and Mister. The feral girl comes to their aid, having grown attached to Mister. She was bitten by a vampire earlier after leaving the civilians and Mister kills her out of mercy. Saddened and disillusioned, Mister tells Martin he can't do it anymore and makes Martin leave while he stays behind to fight the remaining vampires who had followed them from the base.

== Release ==
Stake Land II debuted on digital platforms on February 7, 2017 with Blu-ray and DVD release on February 14, 2017. Damici has expressed interest in making the series a trilogy but noted that MPI owns the property so it is ultimately up to them.

== Reception ==
Bloody Disgusting gave the film three and a half out of four skulls saying "The film doesn’t capture that same success that the first film had, but it’s still a worthy follow-up for those who enjoyed the original." Nerdist said "While Stake Land II is clearly working on a small budget, the filmmakers do all they can to deliver a fast-moving post-apocalyptic “quest” movie full of gory vampire attacks, colorful stock character archetypes, and a slyly surly attitude." Dread Central found the film mildly disappointing saying "Overall, the film acts as a serviceable addition to the story, but the regrettable element is that it could have been so much more – still is worth a watch for fans who sharpened their fangs on the first movie."

== See also ==
- Vampire film
