= Stake Land =

2010 American horror film

- Theatrical release poster
- Directed by: Jim Mickle
- Written by: Nick Damici; Jim Mickle
- Produced by: Derek Curl; Larry Fessenden
- Starring: Nick Damici; Connor Paolo; Michael Cerveris; Sean Nelson; Kelly McGillis; Danielle Harris
- Cinematography: Ryan Samul
- Edited by: Jim Mickle
- Music by: Jeff Grace
- Production companies: Belladonna Productions; Glass Eye Pix; Off Hollywood Pictures; Scareflix
- Distributed by: Dark Sky Films; IFC Films
- Release dates: September 17, 2010 (Canada); October 1, 2010 (United States)
- Running time: 98 minutes
- Country: United States
- Language: English
- Budget: $625,000
- Box office: $33,245

Stake Land is a 2010 American post apocalyptic vampire horror film directed by Jim Mickle and starring Nick Damici, who cowrote the script with Mickle. It also stars Connor Paolo, Danielle Harris and Kelly McGillis. The plot revolves around an orphaned young man being taken under the wing of a vampire hunter known only as "Mister", and the battle for survival in their quest for a haven.

== Plot ==
When a pandemic of vampirism strikes, humans find themselves on the run from vicious, feral beasts. Large cities are left as tombs and survivors cling together in rural pockets, fearing nightfall. When his family is slaughtered, young Martin (Connor Paolo) is taken under the wing of a grizzled, wayward vampire hunter, called Mister (Nick Damici).

Mister takes Martin on a journey through the locked-down towns of America's heartland, searching for a better place in the famed 'New Eden', up north, while taking down any bloodsuckers that cross their path. Along the way, they are joined by others, the first being a nun known only as Sister (Kelly McGillis), who they rescue from two young rapists who Mister kills without hesitation. They continue to move north, avoiding major thoroughfares that have been seized by The Brotherhood, a fundamentalist militia headed by such fanatics as Jebedia Loven (Michael Cerveris), who interprets the plague as God's will at work.

The group is captured by The Brotherhood and it is revealed that one of the rapists killed by Mister was Loven's son. As punishment, Mister is left at the mercy of a group of vampires. Sister is taken as a sex slave and Martin will be kept as a forced convert to the Brotherhood. Martin promptly escapes the Brotherhood camp and discovers that Mister has survived the vampire attack and they drive off together, unable to help Sister.

Coming across a survivors' roadhouse, they pick up another traveler, the pregnant Belle (Danielle Harris), who hopes to make it to New Eden to have her child. Later, they also pick up Willie (Sean Nelson), a former Marine, who is found hiding in a workmen's toilet having been abandoned as vampire bait by The Brotherhood. Willie informs the group that American military forces were withdrawn from the Middle East to help contain the outbreak and that there is no Middle East to fight over anymore, as it is overrun by vampires. He goes on to say that The Brotherhood was partially responsible for the fall of America, ramming cars filled with vampires through blockades and crashing airplanes filled with vampires into cities. Overwhelmed as the plague spread across the U.S., the armed forces collapsed and no longer exist. The four decide to go after Jebedia, whom they ambush, then tie to a tree and leave for the vampires.

The group next encounters a survivors' settlement and discover that Sister also escaped. The same night, celebrations are interrupted when The Brotherhood, using helicopters, drop vampires into town, killing many residents. Though invited to stay and help rebuild the settlement, the group decides to move on towards the north again.

Midway, their car breaks down and they have to continue their journey on foot. They manage to avoid dangerous areas for some time; while sleeping at an abandoned auto junk yard, they are attacked by 'berserkers', the oldest and strongest kind of vampire. They run into a corn field and Sister diverts the chase away from the others, then shoots herself in the head when overrun.

After several days of walking through the wilderness, they take shelter in a broken-down school bus turned camper and notice in the morning that Willie is missing. The three search for him, first finding his blanket then finding Willie killed and strung up in a tree. Mister notes he has never encountered a thinking vampire before and warns the others to stay alert. Despite their best efforts, Belle is taken from their campsite during the night and Mister and Martin find her in an abandoned silo the following day, wrapped in barbed wire and bitten. Jebedia Loven, now a thinking vampire thanks to having given himself willingly to the vampires that attacked him, reveals himself and attacks Martin and then Mister. Martin manages to impale Jebedia and an injured Mister finishes him off. Martin kills Belle, saving her from becoming a vampire.

The duo head north again, acquiring a pickup truck and they meet Peggy, who lives alone in an abandoned restaurant and who picks off approaching vampires using a crossbow. Martin and Peggy have an instant connection and Martin easily attacks and kills a vampire outside the restaurant that night, with Mister covertly looking on. The next day, Mister is gone and Martin finds his mentor's skull pendant hanging from the truck's mirror. He and Peggy head off by themselves, finally arriving at the border to Canada, the New Eden for which they were searching.

== Cast ==
- Nick Damici as Mister, hunter of the zombie-like vampires who takes Martin under his wing while traveling north.
- Connor Paolo as Martin, in his early to mid-teens when he first meets Mister.
- Michael Cerveris as Jebedia Loven, a cult leader who claims the vamps are sent to do his and the Lord's work.
- Danielle Harris as Belle, a young woman who is pregnant when she starts traveling with Mister and Martin. According to Damici, Belle was originally written as an older character and something of a love interest for Mister. After interviewing Harris, Damici thought she seemed more like his character's "grandkid", and that they could rewrite the script accordingly.
- Kelly McGillis as Sister, a nun saved from two rapists by Mister and Martin who then begins traveling with them. Stake Land was the first feature film for McGillis after a ten-year hiatus from acting.
- Sean Nelson as Willie, a former Marine picked up on the road.
- Bonnie Dennison as Peggy, slightly older than Martin, she is found living alone in a roadside diner.
- Chance Kelly as Officer Harley
- Tim House as Sheriff
- Larry Fessenden as the roadhouse bartender. Fessenden also produced the film.
- Adam Scarimbolo as Kevin
- Marianne Hagan as Dr. Foley

== Prequels ==
The producers, Glass Eye Pix, created seven webisodes as prequels set during the start of the apocalypse, to coincide with the release of the film.

- Origins (Directed by Larry Fessenden): A boy is filming his father, a butcher, on the job for a school project. He continues filming the family at dinner as a news report about the plague can be heard in the background. Later, the boy goes outside to see his father but the man, turned into a vampire, begins chasing the boy, who runs back to his house and is attacked by his mother, also turned. The father then slashes the boy's head off his body.
- The Day I Told My Boyfriend (Written and directed by Graham Reznik, story by Nick Damici): Belle lets her boyfriend know about her pregnancy as they ride in his car. They are immediately involved in a car accident and Belle, trapped in the upside-down, smashed car, sees her motionless boyfriend being dragged away into a field.
- Jebedia (Written and directed by Larry Fessenden): Jebedia Loven reads the Bible while receiving a tattoo on the back of his head.
- Willie (Written and directed by Danielle Harris, story by Nick Damici): Former Marine Willie is walking through a rural area, dragging a body. He arrives at a treeline where another body is hung. He kneels down, using a Rosary to pray before continuing his journey into woods alone.
- Sister (Directed by JT Petty, story by Nick Damici): Sister is alone in her church. A body, wrapped in cloth, begins to twitch, and other wrapped bodies are revealed. Sister drags them outside and douses them with gas, then begins praying. A truck pulls up and three men get out, two of them dressed in Brotherhood robes. One removes his robes to reveal he is naked underneath. Sister tosses a lit candle on the dead bodies and looks at the men.
- Martin (Written and directed by Glenn McQuaid): Martin is having a dream about himself and the plague, when his mother wakes him and tells him to pack a bag. He hears noises outside the house but joins his mother to head out. Both characters are wearing the same clothes as in the initial scene in the film.
- Mister (Directed by Larry Fessenden, written by Nick Damici): Mister makes his way to his childhood home in the woods, where his father has had to shoot his mother after she turned. The father then dies, and Mister retrieves his skull pendant from around his neck before burying him and his mother.

== Production ==
Stake Land was originally envisioned by Mickle and Damici, who had worked together on the film Mulberry Street in 2006, as a web series about a vampire hunter that they could produce cheaply, on the weekends. They had developed forty 8-minute scripts and brought them to producer Larry Fessenden, who suggested a feature film instead. Fessenden, a producer on the film and mentor to Mickle, rejected an early script that he felt lacked heart. Mickle agreed and reworked the script to emphasize feelings of isolation over bloodshed. Mickle and Damici specifically wanted to include happy moments and co-operation in the script, as they felt that many post-Apocalyptic films were unremittingly grey. Religious extremists were added to show their toxic effect on society. They also wanted to emphasize reality, and they avoided overly stylized action sequences. Mickle and Damici also wanted to emphasize more than just monsters and a vampire plague. Mickle states that he wanted to make a film that would still work without the horror elements. Mickle was unaware of Danielle Harris' history in horror films, and he was more familiar with her work on sitcoms.

Shooting took place in Pennsylvania, upstate New York, and the Catskills Mountains. There was a three-month hiatus in the shooting schedule so that the seasons could change for the exterior shots. Shooting took 26 days. The long take in the survivor's settlement, with the vampires being dropped by the brotherhood, was not originally planned that way but evolved as time limitations forced the scene into a single day's shooting. Mickle decided that the best way to solve the time issues was to get it over with as a single take. In the end, only a few frames were edited out to remove poor acting from extras. The score was performed by Glass Eye Pix regular Jeff Grace, whose work on The Last Winter had impressed Mickle.

== Release ==
The film opened on one screen on April 22, 2011, and made $7,258 in its first week. In its second week, the film expanded to five screens and made an additional $8,437. The total domestic gross for the film in its limited theatrical run was $33,245. It was released on home video August 2, 2011.

== Reception ==
The film received fairly positive reviews with Rotten Tomatoes giving the film a 75% "fresh" rating from 60 reviews; the consensus states: "Though the genre is well worn at this point, director Jim Mickle focuses on strong characterization and eerie atmosphere to craft an effective apocalyptic vampire chiller that also manages to pack a mean punch." At the site Metacritic, which assigns films a weighted average score of 0 to 100, the film received a score of 66 based on 15 mainstream critics, indicating "generally favorable reviews".

Roger Ebert of the Chicago Sun-Times gave the film three stars out of four, writing that "Director Jim Mickle, who co-wrote the film with his star, Nick Damici, has crafted a good looking, well-played and atmospheric apocalyptic vision." Alissa Simon of Variety called it "a highly satisfying low-budget horror-thriller". Serena Whitney of Dread Central rated it four out of five stars and called it "a taut thriller replete with gripping emotion behind it". Jeannette Catsoulis of The New York Times named it a NYT Critics' Pick and called it "unusually taut". Salon made it their "pick of the week", and praised it for its focus on characters rather than monsters. However, Joshua Rothkopf of Time Out New York rated it one out of five stars and wrote, "You really shouldn't see Stake Land—even if you are in the mood for lax, uninspired end-of-the-world-with-vampires thrills."

The film was shown at the 2010 Toronto International Film Festival (TIFF), where it won the Midnight Madness Cadillac People's Choice Award.

== Sequel ==
In June 2016, it was revealed that a sequel had been filmed and would be released as a Syfy original film later in the year.

The sequel, titled Stake Land II, premiered on Syfy on October 15, 2016.

== See also ==
- Vampire film
