= Mulberry Street (film) =

- Promotional film poster
- Directed by: Jim Mickle
- Written by: Nick Damici; Jim Mickle
- Produced by: Victor Assante; Rene Bastian; Adam Folk; Tim House; Linda Moran
- Starring: Nick Damici; Kim Blair; Ron Brice; Bo Corre; Tim House; Larry Fleischman; Larry Medich; Javier Picayo; Antone Pagan; Lou Torres; John Hoyt
- Cinematography: Ryan Samul
- Edited by: Jim Mickle
- Music by: Andreas Kapsalis
- Production company: Belladonna Productions
- Distributed by: After Dark Films
- Release dates: November 16, 2006 (Stockholm International Film Festival); March 18, 2008 (U.S. Direct-to-Video)
- Running time: 85 minutes
- Country: United States
- Language: English
- Budget: $60,000

Mulberry Street (also released as Zombie Virus on Mulberry Street) is a 2006 American horror film directed by Jim Mickle and written by Mickle and Nick Damici, who also stars.

Set on Mulberry Street in Manhattan, the film follows a group of apartment-building residents as a rapidly spreading infection turns people into rat-like, zombie-style creatures and forces the survivors to barricade themselves against the outbreak. The film’s cast includes Kim Blair, Ron Brice, Bo Corre, Tim House, and Larry Fessenden.

Produced on a budget of $60,000, Mulberry Street premiered at the Stockholm International Film Festival on November 16, 2006, and was released theatrically in the United States by After Dark Films as part of the 8 Films to Die For lineup on November 9, 2007, before a direct-to-video release on March 18, 2008. The film received generally positive reviews.

== Plot ==
Set during a long and hot summer day and night, a deadly infection breaks out on Mulberry Street in downtown Manhattan, causing humans to devolve into bloodthirsty monstrosities. Most of the information in the film comes from TV news broadcasts, where, as a result of constant urban decay, pollution, and unbearable heat, the sewer rats of Manhattan are rapidly spreading an unknown and horrific disease that causes their victims to mutate into ravenous, bloodthirsty rat-creatures. Once bitten, people quickly turn into rabid-like creatures with the appearance and eating habits of rats, and they only look at their former friends and neighbors as a source of food. Clutch, a retired boxer, nervously awaits the homecoming of his soldier daughter, Casey, recently back from a tour of duty in Iraq, but first he has to protect the other tenants as the rat-zombies are quickly infesting the entire neighborhood.

Initially, emergency services and city authorities attempt to contain the spread by shutting down public transportation and closing roads, but soon hospitals are inundated with the wounded, and the virus begins to spread island-wide. By the time Clutch and the rest of the film's characters realize the severity of the situation, the infected have overrun much of the city, and the streets are highly dangerous, with police seemingly overwhelmed and unable to respond. The survivors barricade themselves in their apartments as the news of the outbreak and subsequent quarantine of Manhattan breaks on TV and radio, waiting for a promised rescue from the military, which the government promises will begin to restore order in Manhattan soon.

== Cast ==
- Nick Damici as Clutch
- Kim Blair as Casey
- Ron Brice as Coco
- Bo Corre as Kay
- Tim House as Ross
- Larry Fleischman as Charlie
- Larry Medich as Frank
- Javier Picayo as Otto
- Antone Pagán as Peter Pace
- John Hoyt as Big Vic
- Lou Torres as Larry the Bartender
- Larry Fessenden as Man behind the gate

== Production ==
Jim Mickle and Nick Damici met while working on a student thesis film. They came up with the idea of a back-to-basics zombie film called Dead of Night, but the estimated budget was too high for them. Tim House, who played the super, offered to put up $10,000, and the concept and style were reworked to fit around that budget. Eventually, the film grew from there and morphed into something less traditional. Many of the characters were based on people they knew from the real apartment building, and the actors were made up of friends and family. The film was shot in three and a half weeks.

== Release ==
Damici and Mickle had to fight to keep the title, as their representatives wanted to title it something more evocative of the current horror boom. Damici and Mickle, however, wanted to emphasize the theme of gentrification.

Mulberry Street premiered at the Stockholm International Film Festival on November 16, 2006. It got a theatrical release through After Dark Films on November 9, 2007. It was included in the After Dark Horrorfest 2007 DVD box set, released on March 18, 2008.

== Reception ==
Rotten Tomatoes, a review aggregator, reports that 70% of ten surveyed critics gave the film a positive review; the average rating was 6.9/10. Jay Weissberg of Variety called it "a cut above most zero-budget horrors" that may become a cult film. Bloody Disgusting rated it 2/5 stars and wrote, "The concept is solid but the execution is rife with problems." Joshua Siebalt of Dread Central rated it 4/5 stars and recommended it to people who want "a tense and terrifying claustrophobic heart attack". Jeremy Knox of Film Threat rated it 4.5/5 stars and wrote, "Off the top of my head, I can’t really think of another recent example of filmmaking in its purest form that tops Mulberry Street." Scott Collura of IGN wrote that film rises above its limitations by its expertly realized characters and subtle themes. Steve Biodrowski of Cinefantastique called it "half-brilliant and half-okay", criticizing the film's lighting and cinematography. Ian Jane of DVD Talk rated it 3.5/5 stars and wrote, "Mulberry St. was a surprisingly engaging horror film. It moves at a great pace, it features some very strong performances, and while it might borrow from a few other films a little too much, at least it does so well." Paul Pritchard of DVD Verdict called it "a surprisingly effective little shocker that, though far from perfect, is never dull and well worth 84 minutes of anybody's time."

== See also ==
- List of zombie films
