= We Are What We Are (2013 film) =

2013 film

- Film poster
- Directed by: Jim Mickle
- Written by: Nick Damici; Jim Mickle
- Based on: We Are What We Are by Jorge Michel Grau
- Produced by: Rodrigo Bellott; Andrew Corkin; Linda Moran; Nicholas Shumaker; Jack Turner; Nicholas Kaiser
- Starring: Bill Sage; Julia Garner; Ambyr Childers; Kelly McGillis
- Cinematography: Ryan Samul
- Edited by: Jim Mickle
- Music by: Jeff Grace; Darren Morris; Phil Mossman
- Production companies: Belladonna Productions; Memento Films International; Uncorked Productions; Venture Forth
- Distributed by: Entertainment One
- Release dates: January 18, 2013 (Sundance); September 27, 2013 (limited)
- Running time: 105 minutes
- Country: United States
- Language: English
- Box office: $81,381

We Are What We Are is a 2013 American horror film directed by Jim Mickle, and starring Bill Sage, Julia Garner, Ambyr Childers and Kelly McGillis. It was screened at the 2013 Sundance Film Festival and in the Directors' Fortnight section at the 2013 Cannes Film Festival. It is a remake of the 2010 Mexican film which is itself a sequel to Cronos.

== Plot ==
The Parkers are a somewhat reclusive religious family living in the Catskill Mountains who are about to undergo a period of ritual fasting. After purchasing supplies at a local goods store, Mrs. Parker notices a poster regarding a missing teenage girl. She begins bleeding from the mouth and, before she can reach her car, stumbles into a water-logged ditch and drowns. Consumed by grief, her husband, Frank, does not show up to identify the body but instead sends his two daughters, Rose and Iris. Doctor Barrow, who delivered Frank's young son Rory, explains that an autopsy is mandated by the state. During the examination, he finds evidence of a prion disease.

Rose and Iris debate whether they are prepared to take over their mother's religious duties, but Iris is adamant that they perform this year's ritual. Rory wanders into his father's shed and finds a young woman held hostage—Frank had abducted her when he saw her car disabled by the side of the road a few months earlier. Frank forces his daughters to kill and butcher the captive. They reluctantly obey, and the entire family eats her remains.

Doc Barrow, whose daughter previously had gone missing, becomes suspicious when he finds a bone fragment in a creek. Though Sheriff Meeks brushes off his concerns, Barrow is able to convince Deputy Anders to investigate. Anders finds more evidence in the creek, only to be confronted by Iris, upon whom he has a crush. Anders confesses his feelings for her. Confused and overwhelmed with guilt, Iris breaks into tears. Anders comforts her, and they have sex, but Frank finds them and kills Anders.

Frank is livid at the girls and orders them to stay in their bedroom. He then goes out to the field and yells out scriptures while tearing apart crops near the riverbed with a machete. He finds a mandible, then proceeds to discover countless remains floating down the river rapids. Frank tries to grab as many as possible before realizing it is futile. In his office, Barrow realizes he has misidentified Mrs. Parker's symptom and that she was actually suffering from kuru—a disease caused by human cannibalism. Meanwhile, the girls form a plan for them to leave for the city while their father is asleep. While Frank is reciting prayers in his room, Rose takes the car keys. Frank cooks and poisons dinner with several cups of powdered arsenic which Rose later finds and discovers his plan for murder-suicide. At dinner, Rose slaps away Rory's bowl and spoon before he can take a bite. Barrow suddenly arrives to speak to Frank and is shocked to see his missing daughter's hair ornament in Iris' hair. Demanding to know what happened to her, Barrow fights with Frank. Getting his gun, Frank tries to shoot Barrow but wounds Iris when she jumps in front of Barrow to protect him. Frank is ultimately able to knock out Barrow. Rose and Rory flee to the house of their kindly vegetarian neighbor, Marge. Frank breaks into Marge's house and kills her, then convinces Rory and Rose to return home.

Frank again tries to get the children to eat. But when he tells Rose she looks like her deceased mother, Rose and Iris attack him. They bite into him, ripping his flesh from his body, eating at him until he dies. Rose notices Barrow, barely conscious, has just witnessed the whole thing. She places his daughter's hair ornament on his chest. The next morning, the children leave town. In Rose's hands is the diary her father previously gave her, which details their ancestors' memories of cannibalism.

== Cast ==
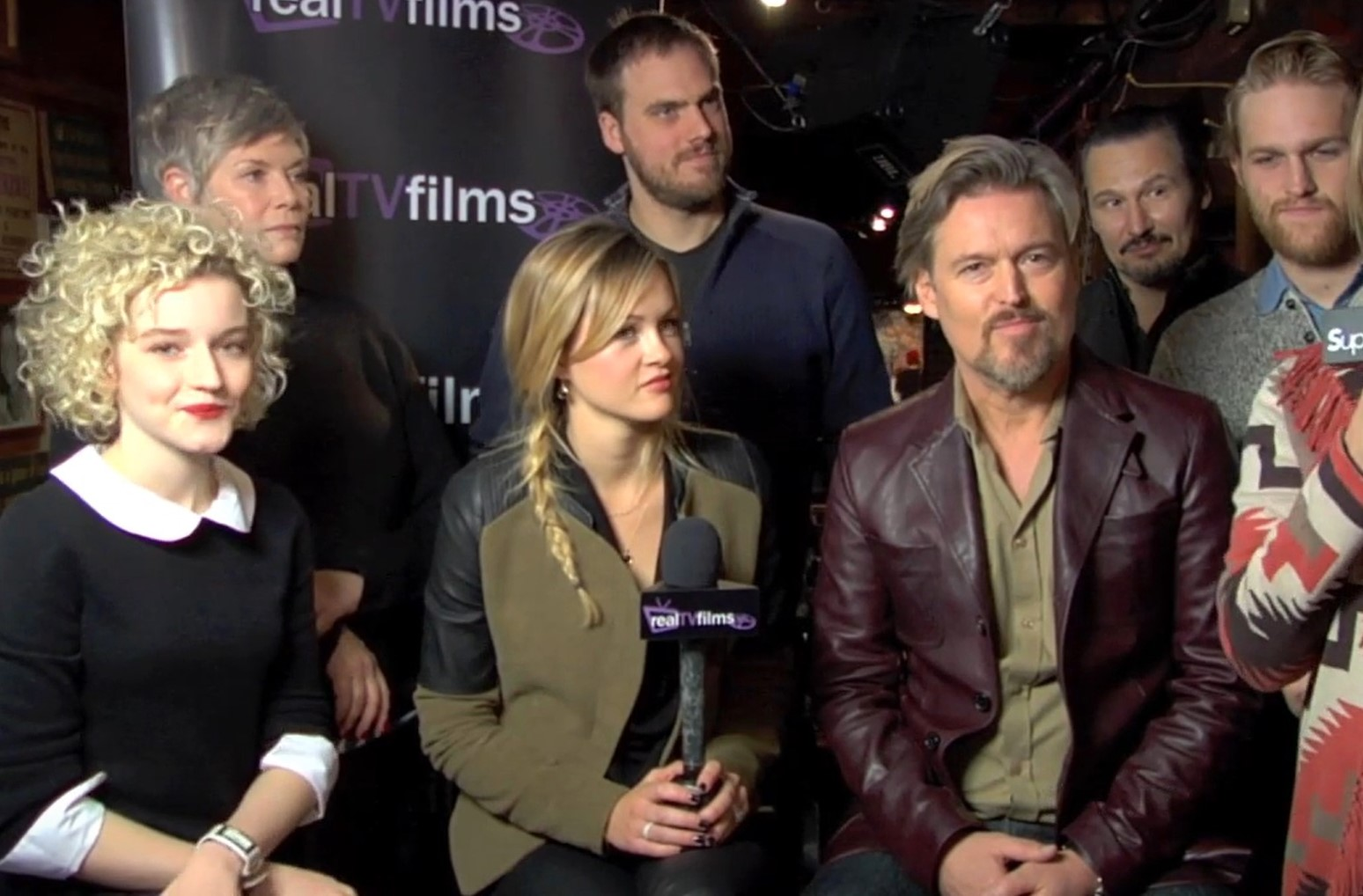
Left to right: Julia Garner, Kelly McGillis, Ambyr Childers, Jim Mickle, Bill Sage, Nick Damici, Wyatt Russell interviewed about We Are What We Are at the 2013 Sundance Film Festival

- Bill Sage as Frank Parker
- Ambyr Childers as Iris Parker
- Julia Garner as Rose Parker
- Wyatt Russell as Deputy Anders
- Nick Damici as Sheriff Meeks
- Kelly McGillis as Marge
- Michael Parks as Doctor Barrow
- Jack Gore as Rory Parker
- Odeya Rush as Alyce Parker
- Kassie DePaiva as Emma Parker
- Larry Fessenden as Bearded Tenant

== Production ==
Principal photography began on May 29, 2012, and continued until the first week of July. Director Jim Mickle did not originally want to direct a remake of the original film, as he dislikes American remakes of foreign horror films. After speaking with Jorge Michel Grau, Mickle and Damici realized they could put their own spin on it. Michael Haneke, Japanese horror, and cult film Martha Marcy May Marlene served as inspirations. Mickle wanted to challenge himself by changing his style and relying more on atmosphere and methodical pacing. Mickle is a fan of Michael Parks and Kelly McGillis and sought to cast them in the film. Larry Fessenden, who has appeared in all of Mickle's films, has a cameo, as Mickle thought it inappropriate to make a horror film in the Catskills without Fessenden, who has a house there. The dark subject matter caused issues with the film's younger cast members. Mickle consulted Jack Gore's parents, and they decided that Gore should only know his own scenes.

== Release ==
We Are What We Are premiered at the 2013 Sundance. After a limited release in New York City and Los Angeles on September 27, 2013, it opened nationally on October 4, 2013. It was released on home video January 7, 2014.

== Reception ==
Metacritic, which uses a weighted average, assigned the film a score of 71 out of 100, based on 27 critics, indicating "generally favorable" reviews. On the review aggregator website Rotten Tomatoes, 86% of 91 critics' reviews are positive, with an average rating of 7/10. The website's consensus reads: "A compelling story cleverly told, We Are What We Are quenches horror buffs' thirst for gore while serving up serious-minded filmmaking and solid acting."

Jeannette Catsoulis of The New York Times called it "a dreamy commentary on the ravages of extreme religious observance." Guy Lodge of Variety called it an "exuberantly grisly" film that genre fans will enjoy. David Rooney of The Hollywood Reporter called it "a refreshingly mature genre entry that plants queasy dread and unleashes a good dose of scares". Michael O'Sullivan of The Washington Post called it predictable and gross. Scott Weinberg of Fearnet called it "a trenchant and fascinating indictment of the ways in which religion can brainwash and poison even the most innocent of souls." Tim Grierson of Screen Daily called it "a tense, unsettling experience that offers very little gore but nonetheless knows how to turn the stomach." Ryan Daley of Bloody Disgusting rated it 3.5/5 stars and wrote that the film "lacks any real surprises" but "has a lot to say and it says it well." Drew Tinnin of Dread Central rated it 2.5/5 stars and wrote that the payoff is much better than the slow-paced buildup.
