= Jim Mickle =

American director and writer (born 1979)

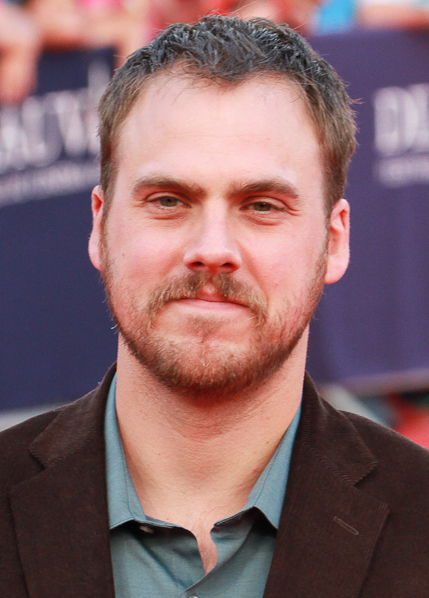
- Mickle in 2014
- Born: 1979 (age 46–47); Pottstown, Pennsylvania, U.S.
- Occupations: Director; screenwriter
- Years active: 2006–present

James Mickle (born 1979) is an American director and writer, known for such films as Mulberry Street, Stake Land, We Are What We Are and Cold in July. He also co-developed the SundanceTV series Hap and Leonard, and the Netflix series Sweet Tooth.

== Early life ==
Jim Mickle was born in Pottstown, Pennsylvania in 1979. Mickle was inspired to become a director after he saw Army of Darkness. He attended New York University and graduated in 2002. He worked as a production assistant and grip on a series of films by first-time directors who had not gone to film school. The experiences were frustrating for him, and he described the films as vanity projects. Mickle prefers directing and editing to writing, and he is attracted to the flexibility and intensity of horror films.

== Career ==
Mickle and Nick Damici met while working on a student thesis film in 2001. While there, they came up with the idea for a zombie film. This concept eventually morphed into their first collaboration, Mulberry Street, a horror film about gentrification in New York City. Mickle's second film, Stake Land, was a New York Times Critics' Pick. His 2013 film We Are What We Are was screened at the 2013 Sundance Film Festival and in the Directors' Fortnight section at the 2013 Cannes Film Festival. He directed the film adaptation of Joe R. Lansdale's novel Cold in July, in which Michael C. Hall starred, and has worked on Esperanza, the story of a fatal wildfire in southern California, adapted by Sean O'Keefe from a book by John N. Maclean. In 2016 Mickle & Damici developed the TV series Hap and Leonard, based on Joe R. Lansdale's novels, with Mickle directing multiple episodes during the series' three seasons.

== Awards ==
Year	Organization	Award
2007	Toronto After Dark Film Festival	After Dark Spirit Award
2007	Amsterdam Fantastic Film Festival	Special mention
2010	Toronto International Film Festival	People's Choice Award
2011	Neuchâtel International Fantasy Film Festival	Special mention
2014	Sitges Film Festival	Best director in Official Fantàstic Òrbita Category Awards for Cold in July

== Filmography ==
Film

Year	Title	Director	Writer	Producer	Editor	VFX	Notes
2006	Mulberry Street	Yes	Yes	No	Yes	Yes	Also sound editor
2010	Stake Land	Yes	Yes	No	Yes	Yes	Also soundtrack ("In The Pines")
2013	We Are What We Are	Yes	Yes	No	Yes	Yes	
2014	Cold in July	Yes	Yes	No	Yes	Yes	
2019	In the Shadow of the Moon	Yes	No	Yes	No	No	
2027	Gundam	Yes	Yes	Yes	No	No	

Television

Year	Title	Director	Writer	Executive Producer	Creator	Developer	Notes
2016–2018	Hap and Leonard	Yes	Yes	Yes	No	Yes	Directed 6 episodes; Wrote 8 episodes
2021–2024	Sweet Tooth	Yes	Yes	Yes	Yes	Yes	Directed 7 episodes; Wrote 6 episodes

== Reception ==
Title	Year	Metacritic	Rotten Tomatoes
Mulberry Street	2006	N/A	70%
Stake Land	2010	66/100	75%
We Are What We Are	2013	71/100	85%
Cold in July	2014	73/100	84%
Hap and Leonard	2016–2018	73/100	87%
In the Shadow of the Moon	2019	48/100	59%
Sweet Tooth	2021–2024	78/100	92%
