= Nick Damici =

American actor and screenwriter

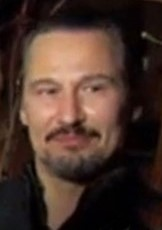
- Damici at the 2013 Sundance Film Festival
- Born: 1959 or 1960 (age 66–67); United States
- Occupations: Actor, screenwriter
- Years active: 1998 – present

Nick Damici is an American actor and screenwriter known for such films as Mulberry Street and Stake Land.

== Early life ==
Nick Damici grew up in Hell's Kitchen in the 1960s and early 1970s. His father was a bartender, and Damici would occasionally tend bar at the age of 12. He is of mixed Italian and Canarian descent.

== Career ==
Damici's mentor is Michael Moriarty, who encouraged him to write scripts. Acting remains his primary love; in an interview, he described writing as a "lonely, thankless job". After he tired of supporting roles on television shows, he decided to write starring roles for himself. Damici and Jim Mickle have worked together since 2001 and have collaborated on four films: Mulberry Street, Stake Land, We Are What We Are, and Cold in July. Damici originally wrote Stake Land to be a web series, but Larry Fessenden was enthusiastic about making it into a feature film. In February 2013, he was cast in Adrian Garcia Bogliano's Late Phases.

== Filmography ==
=== As screenwriter ===
Title	Year	Notes
Mulberry Street	2006	
Stake Land	2010	
We Are What We Are	2013	
Cold in July	2014	
Bushwick	2016	
Hap and Leonard	2016–2018	TV series
Stake Land II	2017	

=== As actor ===
- In the Cut (film) (2003)
- World Trade Center (2006)
- Mulberry Street (2006)
- Stake Land (2010)
- We Are What We Are (2013)
- Late Phases (2014)
- Dark Was the Night (2014)
- Cold in July (2014)
- Stake Land II (2016)
