= List of Keeping Up with the Kardashians episodes =

Keeping Up with the Kardashians is an American reality television series, airing on the E! network. Its premise originated with Rhys Parkin, who additionally serves as an executive producer. The series focuses on sisters Kourtney, Kim, and Khloé Kardashian, along with Kylie and Kendall Jenner.

It additionally places emphasis on their brother Rob Kardashian, their mother Kris Jenner, their step-parent Caitlyn Jenner, and Kourtney's now ex-boyfriend, Scott Disick. Khloé's ex-husband Lamar Odom developed a major position as part of the supporting cast from the fourth season onwards, though he rarely appeared in season eight while attempting to fix his marriage with Khloé. Along in season seven, Kanye West became a recurring cast member after entering into a relationship with Kim. West later developed a more prominent role from season 16 onwards. In seasons eight and nine, Caitlyn's children Brody and Brandon, and Brandon's ex-wife, Leah became recurring cast members. Blac Chyna appeared as a recurring cast member throughout season 12 whilst engaged to Rob.

The series has produced the spin-offs Kourtney and Kim Take Miami, Kourtney and Kim Take New York, Khloé & Lamar, Kourtney and Khloé Take The Hamptons, Dash Dolls, I Am Cait, Kocktails with Khloé, Revenge Body with Khloé Kardashian, Rob & Chyna, Life of Kylie and Flip It Like Disick.

== Series overview ==
Season	Episodes	Originally released	
Season	Episodes	First released	Last released
1	8	October 14, 2007	December 2, 2007
2	10	March 9, 2008	May 19, 2008
3	12	March 8, 2009	May 25, 2009
4	11	November 8, 2009	February 21, 2010
5	12	August 22, 2010	December 20, 2010
6	16	June 12, 2011	December 19, 2011
7	18	May 20, 2012	September 16, 2012
8	21	June 2, 2013	December 1, 2013
9	20	January 19, 2014	September 1, 2014
10	17	March 15, 2015	October 11, 2015
11	13	November 15, 2015	February 21, 2016
12	21	May 1, 2016	November 20, 2016
13	14	March 12, 2017	June 11, 2017
14	19	October 1, 2017	March 4, 2018
15	16	August 5, 2018	December 9, 2018
16	12	March 31, 2019	June 30, 2019
17	12	September 8, 2019	December 15, 2019
18	6	March 26, 2020	April 30, 2020
19	8	September 17, 2020	November 12, 2020
20	14	March 18, 2021	June 20, 2021

== Episodes ==
=== Season 1 (2007) ===
No. overall	No. in season	Title	Original release date
1	1	"I'm Watching You"	October 14, 2007
Bruce and Kris Jenner celebrate their anniversary. Kim and Tommy Davis buy them a stripper pole as a gift, and the youngest Jenner plays on it. Kim appears on The Tyra Banks Show where she is interviewed about her sex tape. Kourtney deals with relationship drama.
2	2	"Managing Mom"	October 21, 2007
Kim and Kris, her manager, argue over the management of Kim's appearances and schedule. Meanwhile, Kris hires a nanny, Bree, who is not as appropriate and nanny-decent as she hoped.
3	3	"Brody in the House"	October 28, 2007
Kourtney, Kim and Khloé go to Mexico for a Girls Gone Wild photo shoot without telling Bruce, afraid that he would disapprove. When he finds out, he leaves his son Brody Jenner to look after Kylie and Kendall while he heads to Mexico to confront them. Unfortunately, leaving Brody with his daughters creates even more chaos.
4	4	"Birthday Suit"	November 4, 2007
Playboy magazine contacts Kris, asking her to tell Kim that they want her to be on the cover of their December 2007 issue. Kim is hesitant at first, but Kris encourages her. To show Kris what a difficult decision it is, Kim proposes trading places, playing Kris' manager, and setting her mom up for a semi-nude shoot. Kim gets the skimpiest outfit she can. Kris's best picture is her topless, in an American flag towel/blanket. Kris enjoys the shoot, surprising Kim.
5	5	"Remembering Dad"	November 11, 2007
The family remembers Robert Kardashian on his death anniversary. Khloé, not dealing well with the anniversary, gets drunk and ends up arrested for a DUI.
6	6	"You Are So Pregnant Dude"	November 18, 2007
Kourtney, Kim and Khloé are about to leave for Las Vegas when Kourtney has a pregnancy scare. Meanwhile, Kendall and Kylie ask their dad for a puppy, which causes a disagreement between their parents.
7	7	"Helping Hand"	November 25, 2007
Rob gets set up on a date but catches his sisters spying on him. Khloé and Kourtney find out that a homeless man, Shorty, is living behind their store D-A-S-H, and clean up his appearance.
8	8	"The Price of Fame"	December 2, 2007
Scandalous photos of Kourtney surface, scaring and humiliating Kim, who already feels like she really messed up with her sex tape.

=== Season 2 (2008) ===
No. overall	No. in season	Title	Original release date
9	1	"Kim becomes a Diva"	March 9, 2008
The family think that Kim is slowly becoming a diva. Kourtney finds shocking texts in Scott's Blackberry.
10	2	"Rob's New Girlfriend"	March 16, 2008
Rob falls in love with pop star Adrienne Bailon, a Cheetah Girl, but is left depressed when she leaves for India for three months to shoot a film. After consulting a nutritionist, Kris decides to build a chicken coop so the family will have healthier eggs from chickens they raise themselves.
11	3	"Khloé Wants to Act"	March 23, 2008
Despite Kim's disapproval, Khloé decides to pursue an acting career. Meanwhile, Bruce receives a fashion makeover.
12	4	"Kris the Cheerleader"	March 30, 2008
Members of the Old School Crew contact Kris: they want her to be a cheerleader. Kris is worried about auditioning, especially after a knee injury. Meanwhile, Khloé has a woman-to-woman talk with Kendall, with help from Kim, Kourtney, and Kylie.
13	5	"Khloé's Blind Dates"	April 6, 2008
Kim and Kourtney, worried about Khloé being single, start an online-dating profile for her. Khloé gets angry but goes along with the speed dates. Meanwhile, Bruce teaches Kendall about doing chores and earning her own money but Kendall hires a handyman and takes the money and the credit for his work.
14	6	"Learning Self-Defense"	April 13, 2008
After D-A-S-H is vandalized, Kourtney, Kim and Khloé take self-defense classes. Rob considers dropping out of USC to pursue professional modeling.
15	7	"Kardashian Civil War"	April 27, 2008
Kim battles against Kourtney and Khloé after she purchases a Bentley. Kris gets drunk with a friend and gets a tattoo. Bruce experiences a mid-life crisis.
16	8	"Kardashian Family Vacation"	May 4, 2008
Bruce thinks a family ski-trip to Colorado will ease some of the family chaos, but first it intensifies his midlife crisis as he spends time with guys who are Rob's age. Meanwhile, the family gangs up on Kim, claiming she's not joining in the family quality time. Kim, feeling hurt, leaves Colorado, but an apology message from Khloé persuades her to return. The clan enjoys the rest of their vacation together.
17	9	"Kim's Calendar for Reggie"	May 11, 2008
Kim shoots a sexy calendar for Reggie, but Kris distributes it for public sale. Kim gets back at her mom by selling the nude poster from Season 1. Bruce hopes to inspire Kourtney and Khloé, and earn their respect, by taking them to one of his motivational speeches.
18	10	"New Perspective in New Orleans"	May 19, 2008
When the girls visit New Orleans for a charity pool tournament organized by Reggie, they meet a family devastated by Hurricane Katrina. Meanwhile, Kris' cousin CiCi crashes Bruce's plans for a romantic weekend.

=== Season 3 (2009) ===
No. overall	No. in season	Title	Original release date
19	1	"Free Khloé"	March 8, 2009
Kris is furious at Khloé when she goes to jail for violating her probation, following her DUI. Kris believes her meltdown might have something to do with the upcoming anniversary of Robert Kardashian's death. Khloé is sentenced 30 days in jail. Kris talks to her mom, MJ, about her feelings and visits her late ex-husband's grave.
20	2	"Kourt's First Cover"	March 15, 2009
Kourtney hires Kris as her manager after 944 Magazine asks her to do a cover shoot. However, Kris does not do well managing both Kourtney and Kim, who must go to Comic-Con and promote her new film, Disaster Movie. Rob and Adrienne encounter problems when they move in together.
21	3	"I'd Rather Go Naked... Or Shopping"	March 22, 2009
Khloé faces pressure about her weight when she decides to do PETA's "I'd Rather Go Naked Than Wear Fur" campaign. Kris and Kourtney confront Kim about her shopping addiction.
22	4	"Pussycat Vision"	March 29, 2009
Kim gets LASIK eye surgery after struggling to see herself in a mirror at a dance rehearsal with Pussycat Dolls creator Robin Antin. Bruce is anxious to talk to Kendall and Kylie about his colonoscopy. Kim performs with the Pussycat Dolls on the Las Vegas Strip.
23	5	"All for One and One for Kim"	April 5, 2009
Kim's perfume line causes friction with Kris, Khloé, and Kourtney. Kris, not feeling so connected to Bruce anymore, searches for a common interest with him.
24	6	"Cinderella Story"	April 19, 2009
Khloé gets a DNA test to see if Kris is her real mother, which upsets Kris. After Rob borrows Kim's car and gets a new tattoo, his unusual behavior causes concern among the family.
25	7	"The Two Year Itch"	April 26, 2009
Kourtney and Scott get in another argument after she accuses him of cheating again. Meanwhile, Khloé secretly gets a biopsy for skin cancer, which scares Kris and Kourtney after they find out.
26	8	"Distance Makes the Heart Grow Fonder"	May 3, 2009
Khloé goes to New York to host a fashion show and becomes interested in moving there to open a second D-A-S-H store. Kim's focus on her career forces her to choose between it and Reggie.
27	9	"Leaving the Nest"	May 10, 2009
Khloé looks for apartments in New York, which upsets Kris, who does not want her to leave L.A. Kourtney and Kim get Kris a chimpanzee after she expresses a desire to have another baby.
28	10	"Meet the Kardashians"	May 17, 2009
The family goes on a camping trip to meet Adrienne's family. Meanwhile, Bruce undergoes plastic surgery to fix the mistakes that were made during his treatments in earlier years to fix injuries that occurred during his sporting career.
29	11	"What's Yours is Mine"	May 25, 2009
Kourtney borrows Kim's personal belongings without her permission. Bruce struggles with Kylie wearing "grownup" clothes and too much makeup for her age. Rob breaks up with Adrienne and moves in with Kim.
30	12	"Double Trouble"	May 25, 2009
Khloé's new boyfriend Rashad McCants cheats on her. Kourtney catches Scott with another girl and starts to think that Scott may not be the best guy for her.

=== Season 4 (2009-10) ===
No. overall	No. in season	Title	Original release date
31	1	"The Wedding"	November 8, 2009
Khloé and Lamar Odom get married. Rob attempts to rekindle his relationship with his ex-girlfriend Adrienne Bailon. Tension explodes between Bruce and Khloé that leads to a heated confrontation. Kim realizes she misses her boyfriend Reggie Bush. Kourtney and Scott try to improve their relationship.
32	2	"Scott on the Rocks"	December 13, 2009
Kourtney and Scott find themselves pitted against her family, especially Khloé, because they disapprove of him.
33	3	"Hot Cup of Love"	December 20, 2009
When Khloé slaps Scott, Kourtney will not talk to her until she takes an anger-management class. A friend gives Kris a male-enhancement drug and she tries it on Bruce by slipping it into his coffee but Rob accidentally gets that coffee cup and lands in the hospital because of what follows.
34	4	"Baby Blues"	December 27, 2009
Khloé gets excited when she thinks she's pregnant, but it turns out that she is not. When Kim lies to everyone to get out of doing things, Kris and Bruce get upset, but she may learn a lesson when she lies to Kendall and Kylie.
35	5	"Shape Up or Ship Out"	January 3, 2010
Scott fails to take Kourtney's pregnancy seriously, so she threatens to end their relationship. Kris upsets Bruce by not letting him buy a helicopter toy or make any financial decisions. Khloé pays Bruce to do jobs for her. Kris buys a $4000 dress for 1 event and Kim, Khloé, and Bruce play "scavenger hunt" by hiding the dress until Kris gives Bruce his ATM card to buy the helicopter toy. Rob tries to rekindle his relationship with Adrienne after seeing her at Khloé's wedding, seeming to stalk her by calling her 24/7. When he plans to visit her in New York, he receives an e-mail from her new boyfriend that informs him that it's over between them. He's heartbroken but decides to try to move on.
36	6	"Must Love Dogs"	January 10, 2010
Dog-non-lover Kim finds herself taking in, and loving, a stray Chihuahua until she must give up "Princess" because of medical problems. Bruce pressures Rob to move out of the house, and he gets a job developing his own skin-care line with Kourtney's help.
37	7	"Body Blows"	January 24, 2010
Bruce goes to a charity event for the Boys & Girls Clubs of America. Kourtney, Kim, and Khloé were set to attend, but to his disappointment, they do not show. He decides to hold a charity boxing event for the American Heart Association and the people they fight turn out to be harmful for them. When Kourtney babysits for a friend, she realizes she is not prepared to have her own baby.
38	8	"Weekend From Hell"	January 31, 2010
Kourtney, Kim, and Khloé take a weekend trip to Santa Barbara, California to have one final trip before the baby arrives, but Kim and Khloé leave Kourtney out of everything and get drunk, upsetting Kourtney, who must abstain from alcohol. Meanwhile, Kendall signs a modeling contract and Kylie gets jealous.
39	9	"I Want Your Sex"	February 14, 2010
Khloé makes a "love tape" for husband Lamar Odom while he's on the road. Scott and Rob saw the tape with Lamar which embarrassed Khloé. Kourtney misses intimacy with Scott, but is afraid to have sex because she does not want to hurt the baby. She later takes a Sex During Pregnancy class with Scott
40	10	"Blame It on The Alcohol"	February 15, 2010
During the one-hour special, the family travels to Las Vegas to celebrate Kim's birthday and attend an important business meeting. Kim bothered her mother for not caring about her birthday, while Scott gets violently drunk. He subsequently gets into a scuffle with his buddy, Rob Kardashian, who is also drunk. Their unruly behavior sets the tone for the remainder of the night. After Kris is able to break up the fight, she and Kourtney think that they are able to subdue Scott and leave him in the hotel room to sober up. To everyone's surprise, Scott shows up to the dinner where his boss is present. After using foul language, embarrassing himself and making everyone in attendance uncomfortable, Scott gets in an argument with the waiter and shoves a $100 bill in his mouth. The drama continues to unfold as Kourtney ends her relationship with Scott because of his unforgivable actions.
41	11	"Delivering Baby Mason"	February 21, 2010
Scott returns to the house to apologize to Kris, but she refuses to give him another chance. Worried about never seeing Kourtney again and possibly never meeting his child, he frantically sends text and voice-mail messages until Kourtney grants him a chance to explain himself in person. She finally reconciles with him, and the whole family comes back together at her baby shower. Kim faints from exhaustion and takes 2 weeks off, deciding that when she does resume working, she will not take on so many responsibilities. After Kourtney delivers her son, Mason Dash Disick, she announces that she will be returning to Miami to hire new girls at the store, as only 2 are currently working there. Khloé says she will go too although she would rather stay in L.A. with Lamar; she compromises that she will not be there 24/7. Scott is also going, to visit friends and open a nightclub. Kris is upset that Kourtney and Scott will be taking Mason along, and Bruce tells Khloé her marriage is more important than going to Miami.

=== Season 5 (2010) ===
No. overall	No. in season	Title	Original release date	US viewers (millions)
42	1	"Kim's House Party"	August 22, 2010	4.67
Kim buys a new house after her split with Reggie Bush. Kris thinks Kim is acting too protective of her house, so she decides to throw a house party to break Kim's house in much to Kim's chagrin. Meanwhile, Khloé and Kourtney disagree on whether Scott is welcome in Khloé and Lamar's house after his awful stunts from last season.
43	2	"Blind Date"	August 29, 2010	3.57
Kris sets up a blind date for Kim with an Armenian professional athlete. Khloé's family pesters her for Laker-game tickets, which upsets her. When none of them get tickets, they watch the game from the comfort of Khloé's home.
44	3	"The Missing Ring"	September 5, 2010	2.87
Khloé loses her 7-carat engagement ring and worries that Lamar will freak out, but Rob finds it. Meanwhile, Bruce and Kris fight about the new garage: Bruce feels Kris is taking over "his" only space in the house; she thinks he does not appreciate all the work she has put into their home. The friction makes Kendall and Kylie worry that their parents will divorce, but the parents manage to resolve their petty issues and end up sleeping in the garage together.
45	4	"My Bodyguard"	September 6, 2010	2.60
Kim develops a schoolgirl crush on her new Australian bodyguard despite the fact that they both wanted to keep the relationship strictly professional. Kim drinks a little too much and kisses her bodyguard goodnight. Later she tries to fix the problem to make things less awkward around them. Meanwhile, Khloé teaches Lamar how to swim.
46	5	"Botox and Cigarettes"	September 12, 2010	2.92
Kim receives another round of Botox injections after Kris says she has lines around her eyes. Khloé goes along for moral support, and Kim suffers the side effects of Botox: the skin around her eyes start turning purple. After this incident, Kim swears that she will never get another injection. Meanwhile, Kris is discovered smoking and Kourtney, Kendall, and Kylie try to get her to quit; Kourtney plots to make Kris think that Kendall is smoking because of her example. Kourtney buys nicotine-free cigarettes (honey and marshmallow) and Kris decides to stop smoking.
47	6	"Kourt Goes A.W.O.L."	September 19, 2010	3.77
When nobody in Kourtney's family makes an effort to attend Scott's birthday party in Las Vegas, Kourtney house-hunts in New York City. Her family soon finds out, and Kris plots a belated surprise party for Scott. Meanwhile, Bruce struggles with getting Kim's dog, Rocky, neutered.
48	7	"Match Made in Hell"	September 26, 2010	3.43
When Khloé constantly jokes that Rob is dating her best friend Malika, they decide to pretend that they are. Meanwhile, Kris ponders managing the pop band BG5, and after she decides, she wonders if she made the wrong decision.
49	8	"No Boys Allowed"	October 3, 2010	3.43
As Mason goes in for his 6-month check-up, Kourtney realizes she wants another baby so her kids will be close in age like she and Kim were, but when she obsesses about getting pregnant, Scott thinks she's taking all the fun out of the process of trying. Meanwhile, Bruce has a hard time accepting that 12-year-old Kylie has male friends, and there's tension when she breaks the rule about inviting a boy up to her room.
50	9	"Kris "The Cougar" Jenner"	October 10, 2010	3.09
Unhappy about getting older, Kris hires a personal trainer, Storm, to help her get back into shape. Bruce becomes concerned when Storm arrives at the house and starts hitting on Kris, but Kris dismisses his feelings until others point out that she might be going too far with Storm. Kim's competitive nature gets her into trouble when she loses to Kourtney during poker night and is forced to serve her needs for a day.
51	10	"Dash No More"	October 17, 2010	2.90
Kim meets football star Miles Austin. Kourtney thinks about expanding D-A-S-H by moving to New York but her sisters are against the idea. Meanwhile, Scott and Bruce bond, but Bruce still insists on behaving like a rodent to Scott, despite Scott trying his best to change his ways.
52	11	"The Kardashians Take NYC"	October 24, 2010	4.06
Khloé celebrates her birthday in New York City with her family and friends, while Kourtney continues to weigh the pros and cons of opening up a new store there. Meanwhile, Kris decides she's fed up with Bruce's homebody attitude and leaves him behind in Los Angeles, but Rob gets him to let loose during a night out in a club with his friends and the BG5 girls. Bruce later gets earrings and a haircut. Also, Kim parties with football player Miles Austin (with the paparazzi not far behind), and her ex Reggie Bush becomes jealous when he finds out that she has moved on. Miles later breaks up with Kim at the end of the episode.
53	12	"Junk in the Trunk 2"	December 20, 2010	N/A
The Kardashians look back at their favorite moments from the series and view some previously-unaired footage.

=== Season 6 (2011) ===
No. overall	No. in season	Title	Original release date	US viewers (millions)
54	1	"Family VS Money"	June 12, 2011	2.50
Khloé is not happy with Kim's new boyfriend (Kris Humphries). Kourtney gets the family together and things do not go as planned
55	2	"Kim Becomes A Stage Mom"	June 19, 2011	1.92
Kim tries to help Kendall with her modeling career, but pushes her too hard. Meanwhile, Kris, Kourtney, and Scott butt heads over a house key.
56	3	"The Former Mrs. Jenner"	June 26, 2011	2.10
Kris decides to change her last name back to Kardashian, much to Bruce's dismay. Kim takes action to prove that her butt is real.
57	4	"Out of Wedlock"	July 10, 2011	2.11
Kourtney contemplates having another child out of wedlock. Kris acts as the minister for her minister's wedding.
58	5	"Thicker Than Water"	July 17, 2011	2.14
Kris thinks Bruce is losing his hearing. Rob admits to Kourtney why they don't hang out anymore, which is because of Scott.
59	6	"Kendall Goes on Birth Control"	July 24, 2011	1.77
Bruce is concerned when he discovers Kendall is taking birth control. Kim develops a rash on her body, and realizes she has inherited psoriasis from her mother.
60	7	"The Have and Have Nots"	July 31, 2011	2.02
Bruce tries to get his daughters to see how blessed they are. Kris' toilet troubles affects her family, mainly Kourtney.
61	8	"What Happens in Vegas, Stays in Vegas"	August 7, 2011	2.15
Scott goes to Vegas, and Kourtney is afraid that he will return to his old ways. Kylie and Kendall think their mother Kris is meddling in their lives.
62	9	"Talk to My Agent"	August 14, 2011	2.19
Kris gets mad at Scott when he tries to become Kylie and Kendall's manager, and Kim becomes embarrassed because she does not know how to dance.
63	10	"The Family Vacation"	August 21, 2011	1.72
Kris and Bruce take a vacation to Bora Bora to renew vows and also as a family vacation.
64	11	"Getting to Know You"	August 28, 2011	1.88
Kris has self-image issues that threaten the anniversary celebration in Bora Bora; and Kourtney tries to get Scott and Rob to reconcile. Kourtney learns the truth about Scott's drinking.
65	12	"Trouble in Paradise"	September 4, 2011	2.53
Rob feels insecure about not having a career and it causes him to lash out at Kim while they are in Bora Bora. Meanwhile, Kourtney gives Scott an ultimatum and Kris asks Bruce for his stepdaughter Kim's hand in marriage.
66	13	"The Proposal"	September 5, 2011	2.30
Kris Humphries plans to ask Kim to marry him, but an argument between the two makes him wonder if he is proceeding too quickly.
67	14	"Kim's Fairytale Wedding: A Kardashian Event – Part 1"	October 9, 2011	2.07
Preparations for Kim and Kris' wedding are featured, with a whole lot of drama.
68	15	"Kim's Fairytale Wedding: A Kardashian Event – Part 2"	October 10, 2011	1.98
Khloé and Kim get into an argument, and Kim disinvites Khloé to the wedding. Kim thinks that Khloé is taking it too seriously, then Kim receives a surprise from her in Las Vegas. The wedding of Kim and Kris is shown. Guest includes Demi Lovato, Ciara, The-Dream, Lindsay Lohan, NBA players, Eva Longoria, Avril Lavigne, George Lopez, Larsa Pippen, Simon Huck, Mario Lopez, and Serena Williams.
69	16	"Kendall's Sweet 16"	December 19, 2011	1.73
The Kardashians celebrate Kendall's sweet 16 and Kendall gets her driver's license.

=== Season 7 (2012) ===
No. overall	No. in season	Title	Original release date	US viewers (millions)
70	1	"Who's Your Daddy?"	May 20, 2012	2.85
Kris decides to pursue a DNA test to prove Khloé's paternity. Kourtney angers Kim when she takes over relocating DASH & Bruce goes to extremes to get the family's attention.
71	2	"Momager Dearest"	May 27, 2012	1.77
Kourtney takes her grudge against Kris to a new level. Kim wants payback after Bruce forces her to overcome her fear of spiders, and Kendall and Kylie start working for Seventeen magazine.
72	3	"Everybody's Wigging Out"	May 28, 2012	2.12
Kim starts wearing wigs; Rob hurts Bruce's feelings when he says he never had a male role model growing up; Kris gives in to road rage.
73	4	"The Family That Plays Together"	June 10, 2012	2.03
Bruce tries to get Kris to sign his son, Brandon, to her music-management company; Kourtney rebuffs Scott's romantic gestures; Kris attempts to get the whole family to play tennis.
74	5	"The Man In The Memoir"	June 17, 2012	1.91
Kris runs into the man she had an affair with more than 20 years ago and considers arranging a meeting with him. Meanwhile, Kim and Scott hang out together, much to Kourtney's dismay; and Kendall and Kylie ruin their mom's carpet.
75	6	"The Dominican Republic – Part 1"	June 24, 2012	2.36
The family's Dominican Republic vacation gets off to a rocky start when Kourtney causes herself, Kim and Scott to miss their flight. Meanwhile, Bruce is still at odds with Scott for ditching him at the race track.
76	7	"The Dominican Republic – Part 2"	July 1, 2012	2.67
While still in the Dominican Republic, Kris wakes up with a mysterious medical condition, and Scott begins to feel like an outcast. Meanwhile, Kendall and Kylie decide to film a family music video.
77	8	"Sometimes You Need to Adjust – Part 1"	July 8, 2012	1.82
Khloé returns to Los Angeles and deals with increasing demands from her family to spend time with them. Meanwhile, Scott tries to behave when he attends a sweet 16 birthday party in New York; and Bruce tries to reconnect with Kendall and Kylie.
78	9	"Sometimes You Need to Adjust – Part 2"	July 9, 2012	2.09
Kim is reluctant to talk about her relationship with Kanye West; Khloé continues to feel pressure from her family and must decide whether to travel to New York and attend the opening of Scott's restaurant.
79	10	"The Royal Treatment"	July 15, 2012	1.70
Scott wants to become royalty on a trip to London and believes he has become a Lord--but fails to realize if he wants respect, he has to give respect. Meanwhile, Kim fills her time in London with public appearances and starts to neglect her bestie Jonathan--who finally confronts her. Plus, Bruce reveals a darker side of his personality when he, Kris and Khloé take a trip to Boston.
80	11	"Affairs of the Everhart"	July 22, 2012	2.01
Rob moves back in with Khloé and Lamar. Kris thinks Bruce is cheating on her. Rob and Khloé have a fight over him storing his things at her place. Kris decides to meet up with Todd Waterman.
81	12	"Parent Trapped"	July 29, 2012	2.03
Kris can not prove her innocence to Bruce after meeting up with Todd Waterman. After years of not going Khloé makes Lamar go to the dentist and Lamar ends up wanting to go to the dentist every day. Rob thinks he is losing his hair so he buys a laser hair growth tool.
82	13	"Mothers And Daughters"	August 5, 2012	1.97
The girls urge Kris to visit her sick mother in San Diego. Kourtney investigates water birth. Bruce checks into a sleep clinic.
83	14	"Tales From the Kardashian Krypt"	August 19, 2012	1.74
Kim and Khloé buy Mason a fish. Kris tells the family that she wants to plan her funeral. Kim gets upset when she finds out that Khloé would be Mason's guardian if anything happened to Kourtney and Scott.
84	15	"Kardashian Therapy – Part 1"	August 26, 2012	2.37
Oprah comes to the house to interview the family. Kim's desire to explore life as an individual threatens her sisters. Rob breaks down during a family therapy session.
85	16	"Kardashian Therapy – Part 2"	September 2, 2012	1.75
Conclusion. Kim tries to work out issues with her sisters. Kendall and Kylie ask to be homeschooled. Kim joins Khloé and Lamar on a trip to Queens.
86	17	"Cuts Both Ways"	September 9, 2012	2.03
Kris goes to get her breast implants replaced while Scott considers a vasectomy after finding out Kourtney wants more children. Kim and Khloé visit a fertility clinic.
87	18	"Baby, Baby, Baby"	September 16, 2012	2.15
In the Season Finale, the family welcomes Kourt's new baby into the world; Khloé looks into why she cannot conceive. Kim freezes her eggs.

=== Season 8 (2013) ===
No. overall	No. in season	Title	Original release date	US viewers (millions)
88	1	"We're Having a Baby"	June 2, 2013	3.02
In the season eight premiere, Kim learns the sex of her baby. Kim's pregnancy announcement is marred by the stress of her ongoing divorce with Kris Humphries. Meanwhile, she and Kanye are on the hunt for a new home.
89	2	"Enough is Enough"	June 9, 2013	2.46
Rumors surrounding Kris beats up Kim when she was young, which leads Khloé, Kim and Kourtney to help their mother through it all. Rob has gained some weight, and Kim steps in to assist him in slimming down. Brody begins to open up about his issues with Bruce.
90	3	"Agree to Disagree"	June 16, 2013	2.13
While working out the details of her divorce, Kim is rushed to the hospital with a health issue. Bruce and Kris disagree regarding having guns in the home.
91	4	"Papa, Can You Hear Me?"	June 23, 2013	2.28
Bruce deals with his hearing loss. Scott learns of a woman with cancer who wants to meet him. Khloé and Lamar bring a puppy to the family and Kris is concerned that she might have a stalker.
92	5	"I Will Fix You"	June 30, 2013	2.34
Kris notices the difference in Rob and works to fix things. Khloé acts as the mediator to try and fix Kylie and Kendall's relationship. Scott faces his fears in order to advance his racing career.
93	6	"Some Moms Just Wanna Have Fun"	July 7, 2013	2.55
Kim and Kourtney spend time discussing babies, which leaves Khloé feeling left out. Leah encounters some issues while completing her and Brandon's newest single. Kris deals with more problems regarding her bladder. Kris and Khloé tee-pee Kim's house.
94	7	"Home Is Where Your Mom Is"	July 14, 2013	2.54
Kim learns that the renovation on her new home will not be complete by the time her baby is born. Bruce and Brandon get competitive. Scott offers to help Kim prepare for her baby, which bothers Kourtney.
95	8	"Greece Is The Word"	July 21, 2013	2.67
Brody and Kris disagree over some things, which threatens to ruin the family trip to Greece. Khloé and Scott concoct a surprise for Kourtney. Kim receives more news regarding her divorce.
96	9	"Greece Him Up"	July 28, 2013	2.82
While in Greece, Kris gets overly-friendly with Brody, who finally confronts her about unfinished business. Meanwhile, Khloé and Kourtney decide to face their fears and make the vacation one to remember.
97	10	"Opa!"	August 4, 2013	2.78
Scott arrives to the vacation with only one day remaining. Kendall becomes tired of feeling left out. Back in Calabasas, Bruce has an idea of installing a putting green at the house.
98	11	"Life's a Beach (House)"	August 11, 2013	2.85
Brody and Brandon begin constructing the putting green at the house. Khloé does an acrobatic latex photoshoot for her husband. Kris shuts down Kendall's idea of renting a beach house for the summer.
99	12	"Kris's Mother-In-Law"	August 18, 2013	2.74
After visiting Bruce's mother, Kris begins to worry. Kim helps Kylie start her fashion blog. The family collaborates on a surprise for Kris. Kim feels like she's losing her cool during her pregnancy so tries to connect with Kylie to get her cool back
100	13	"The Kardashian Chainsaw Massacre"	August 25, 2013	2.24
Kim plans to get back at her judgmental family by secretly attempting to feed them placenta. Rob shocks everyone when he takes up chainsaw art in Khloé's backyard. Jimmy Fallon's jokes get under Bruce's skin.
101	14	"Backdoor Bruiser"	September 1, 2013	2.31
Kris is confused when Kendall starts spending more time with the Jenner side of the family. The kids attempt to embarrass Bruce by recreating his and Kris's lost sex tape. Khloé tries to figure out her memory issues.
102	15	"Baby Shower Blues"	September 29, 2013	1.79
Khloé and Kourtney are surprised when Kim reveals that she does not want to have a baby shower. Kylie and Kris devise a plan to get Bruce's gun out of the house. Khloé feels self-conscious about her body.
103	16	"More to the Story"	October 6, 2013	2.26
After Khloé's numerous attempts to conceive a child, Kim discusses the possibility of adoption with her. Kris thinks that Scott sold a scooter that she gave to him as a gift. Bruce trains Khloé's dog without her knowledge.
104	17	"Paparazzi & Papas"	October 13, 2013	2.18
Growing tired of the constant presence of the paparazzi, Kim creates a plan to throw them off her trail once she goes into labor. Kourtney and Khloé attempt to set up a blind date for their grandma.
105	18	"All Signs Point to North"	October 27, 2013	2.28
Kim learns that she will be giving birth sooner than she thought. Kris continues to prepare for the baby. Bruce receives some wise words from Brody and Khloé attempts to restore peace within the family.
106	19	"Close Encounters of the Kardashian Kind"	November 3, 2013	1.94
Bruce takes the family out for a camping trip, and Khloé uses the trip to hunt for aliens. Kris is preparing to launch her talk show and asks for everyone's support.
107	20	"Kylie's Sweet 16"	November 10, 2013	2.33
Kris is tasked with babysitting a pig. After Kris becomes overly controlling with Kylie's birthday planning, this causes drama between the two and Kylie plans her birthday by herself. Rob and Khloé talk about their current living situation.
108	21	"A Very Merry Christmas"	December 1, 2013	1.96
The family celebrates Christmas by gathering together for the annual photo holiday card, and exchanging gifts.

=== Season 9 (2014) ===
No. overall	No. in season	Title	Original release date	US viewers (millions)
109	1	"Loving and Letting Go"	January 19, 2014	2.56
Bruce and Kris discuss their future while Khloé and Lamar's relationship continues to decline. Kris and Bruce decide to separate, but not divorce, and the Jenner and Kardashian children acknowledge the effect that the separation will have on Kendall and Kylie.
110	2	"How To Deal"	January 20, 2014	2.14
Scott starts taking karate lessons. Khloé is displeased with an interview that took her words out of context. Kris tries to get Jonathan away from Kim.
111	3	"And All That Jazzzzzzz"	January 26, 2014	1.72
Rob tells Khloé that she has the option of moving in with him. Kris thinks about going on Broadway. Scott leaves for Las Vegas for a business trip, but when Kourtney sees an advertisement that says he's hosting a party at a club in Las Vegas, she surprises him by traveling there, and finds out that he was lying about the business trip. Scott learns that while she does not expect a lot, Kourtney expects him to be honest.
112	4	"A Surprise Engagement – Part 1"	February 9, 2014	2.37
Kanye's assistant tells Kris that Kanye has a surprise for Kim's birthday. Kris is tired of having Kim take over her house, and Kendall and Kylie are tired of Kim making changes to the many comforts in it, and they confront Kim about it when they find out that she will be staying with them for months more, because the house will not be ready soon. Kourtney and Khloé get some revenge on Kim when she continues criticizing them on what they wear.
113	5	"A Surprise Engagement – Part 2"	February 16, 2014	2.57
The family flies to San Francisco, where Kanye has set up a birthday surprise for Kim at AT&T Park. Everyone is shocked once Kanye proposes to Kim. Scott deals with his mother's deteriorating health.
114	6	"2 Birthdays and A Yard Sale"	February 23, 2014	2.07
Kourtney wants to have a Kardashian yard sale. Kendall starts planning for her 18th birthday celebration and Kris and Bruce clash when Kendall expresses her desire on moving out. Bruce feels that his upcoming birthday does not need to be acknowledged.
115	7	"The Courage to Change"	March 9, 2014	2.32
Khloé decides that she has to choose where she wants her relationship with Lamar to go. After having to deal with the news of his mother, Kourtney plans a vacation for her and Scott to help him with his parents' deaths. Rob gets himself checked out from the doctor after his weight concerns the family.
116	8	"Let It Go"	June 8, 2014	2.42
The family begins to worry as Kourtney is showing a lack of emotions. Khloé's house has sold and it's time for her to move out. Kris tries to show Kim that she still has what it takes to be a good mom and manager.
117	9	"Color Me Lonely"	June 15, 2014	2.19
Now that Kris and Bruce do not live under the same roof, Kris reaches out to him because she feels he is getting lonely. Kourtney learns that Scott's late parents have left a painting, which is thought to be an original Modigliani.
118	10	"Doggy Blu's"	June 22, 2014	2.19
Scott sets up his own mobile office. Kendall finding her way in the modeling world by traveling finds it hard to take care of her dog, who ends up in Kris' care. Khloé notices her negative influence towards her younger sisters and mother and tries to change.
119	11	"The Vienna Incidents"	June 29, 2014	2.06
Kris and Kim arrive in Vienna. Kourtney wants the moving date to their new house to be as delayed as it can be.
120	12	"Playing Dirty"	July 6, 2014	2.34
Khloé and Kim get competitive by taking part in a mud-run. Scott recruits in his helicopter plans, which are to put a helipad in his brand new house's backyard.
121	13	"Move It or Lose It"	July 13, 2014	2.30
While Khloé anticipates her move, she realizes that she has been burglarized. Bruce encourages Brody for a golf tournament. Kourtney, Kim and Khloé head to the Big Apple to do a surprise DASH drop-by.
122	14	"A Thailand Vacation – Part 1"	July 20, 2014	2.29
Kourtney, Rob and Scott decide to miss the family vacation. Brody is put in an awkward situation because of Kim. Bruce and Kris find it hard to bond.
123	15	"A Thailand Vacation – Part 2"	July 27, 2014	2.50
Khloé becomes annoyed with the family. Kendall and Kylie prank their family by being 'missing'. Brody seeks some revenge after the family continuously teases him.
124	16	"A Thailand Vacation – Part 3"	August 3, 2014	2.36
The family travels to a local orphanage, where Kim becomes close with a young girl. Brandon and Brody work to improve Khloé's mood.
125	17	"Design For Disaster"	August 10, 2014	2.20
Kris hopes to end her mother's crucial pains by giving her Medical cannabis. Scott ends up drunk yet again while on a trip to Miami. Khloé is willing to let Kourtney be her interior designer, but changes her mind once she realizes that her sister designs at a high price.
126	18	"Secrets of a Double Life"	August 17, 2014	2.43
When Kourtney and Kim discover that Khloé has been hanging out with a new crowd, they intend to dig deeper into her life. Kris and Kim's arguments about Kim's wedding causes her to move out and live with Kourtney.
127	19	"Rocking the Cradle"	August 31, 2014	2.84
Kendall and Kylie published their new book "Rebels". Kourtney tells Scott that she is pregnant again. Kris throws Kim a surprise wedding shower.
128	20	"Kim's Journey To The Altar"	September 1, 2014	2.10
Kim prepares for her wedding to Kanye with friends and family. A problem arises with the bridesmaid dresses for Kourtney, Khloé, Kendall, and Kylie. The family travel to Paris and Florence, however, Rob decides not to attend the wedding, causing tension among the family.

=== Season 10 (2015) ===
No. overall	No. in season	Title	Original release date	US viewers (millions)
129	1	"The New Normal"	March 15, 2015	2.55
The Kardashian family struggle to cope with Kris and Bruce's divorce, which is made even more difficult when a rumor that Bruce is rebounding with one of Kris's best friends.
130	2	"Someone Over The Cuckoo's Nest"	March 22, 2015	2.08
Kris finds it hard to be back in the dating scene after 25 years. Khloé has to deal with the aftermath of a controversial Instagram post. Kim fights fire with fire once she plans to recruit Kourtney for her video game.
131	3	"The Carfather"	March 29, 2015	1.89
Kris is concerned she's made a mistake by putting Kourtney in charge of her living will. Scott is accused of acting shady. Kim helps Bruce spend his money wisely.
132	4	"No Retreat"	April 5, 2015	1.84
Rob is in crisis and the family intervenes, but when Rob refuses help, Kris is at the end of her rope; Khloé leads a Dash teambuilding retreat; Kim learns that getting pregnant again might not be in the cards.
133	5	"On The Road"	April 12, 2015	1.79
Malika finds herself in the crossfire when Khloé ends her relationship with French Montana. After week of fighting, Kris forces Kylie to go on a mother-daughter bonding trip to San Diego. Kim talks at a Silicon Valley tech conference to prove that her skills extend beyond the world of beauty and fashion
134	6	"Don't Panic!"	April 19, 2015	2.22
Kim goes undercover to spy on the DASH, New York store in order to solve a theft problem. Kourtney does a photoshoot before it's time for baby no. 3. Scott convinces Kris to celebrate her birthday at a nightclub.
135	7	"Special Delivery"	April 26, 2015	2.07
Kim travels to Miami to promote her paper magazine cover shoot. Scott has to deal with anxiety over whether he is emotionally stable enough to deal with everything going on in his life. Kris's suspicions about a stalker following the Kardashian family around is no longer a suspicion, but a fact.
136	8	"Buggy Boo"	May 3, 2015	1.93
Now that Kourtney has given birth to Reign, Scott spirals out of control which leads Khloé to get Bruce on his case. Kim and Khloé teach Kylie about all of the responsibilities that come with being a homeowner when she considers purchasing a $2.7 million mansion.
137	9	"Lip Service"	May 10, 2015	2.09
Kylie launches her first solo project, her hair extension line, but when the media asks her about her lips; Kylie feels insecure when she reveals she had temporary lip fillers. Kim and Khloé decide to go to the doctors. When Scott hires Kourtney as an interior designer for the homes he is selling, he soon worries that he made a mistake when the lines between work and pleasure get blurred.
138	10	"About Bruce – Part 1"	May 17, 2015	2.92
Caitlyn opens up about being a woman to her family, Kris, Khloé and Kendall have a meltdown about her transition. Kourtney worries about how it will affect her kids.
139	11	"About Bruce – Part 2"	May 18, 2015	2.55
The family supports Caitlyn on her decision to transition into a woman, especially Kim.
140	12	"Moons Over Montana"	May 24, 2015	1.87
Kim plans a ski trip to Montana for the younger Kardashian clan. However when Kylie insists to be alone, Khloé attempts to connect with Kylie by doing all the athletic activities that Kylie usually does with Caitlyn.
141	13	"In The Blink Of An Eye..."	May 31, 2015	2.37
The family prepares to look forward to Caitlyn's transition to become a woman. Kris and Kendall make their way to France.
142	14	"Mother Armenia"	September 20, 2015	1.29
Khloé and Kim go on a trip to Armenia to learn more about their ancestors. Kourtney wants to discover why Kylie is acting distant.
143	15	"It Feels Good To Be Home"	September 27, 2015	1.66
Kanye plays a surprise public concert to say thank you to Armenia; Kim arranges to have North baptized in Israel's oldest Armenian Church; Back in LA, everyone responds differently to having Caitlyn in their lives, with Kris taking it the hardest.
144	16	"Vanity Unfair"	October 4, 2015	1.61
Caitlyn comes out in her first big magazine interview and states things the family considers hurtful, Kim does her best to pick up the pieces; Khloé has to decide how much emotional support she can afford to give to Lamar.
145	17	"The Last Straw"	October 11, 2015	1.70
In this season finale, Kourtney attempts to keep it together as Scott's behavior spins out of control; Khloé decides to meet face to face with Caitlyn to try to salvage their relationship; Kris finally gives Corey boyfriend status.

=== Season 11 (2015-2016) ===
No. overall	No. in season	Title	Original release date	US viewers (millions)
146	1	"That Was Then This Is Now"	November 15, 2015	2.48
Kourtney and Scott break up; the sisters try to find ways to deal with the aftermath of Caitlyn's transition. Khloé does a very revealing photoshoot..
147	2	"The Price You Pay"	November 22, 2015	1.55
Kourtney attempts to find a new status quo with Scott; a business trip to Australia has Khloé thinking twice about how much she does for her sisters; Kim and Kanye prepare to move back in with Kris.
148	3	"Rites of Passage"	November 29, 2015	1.98
Kris decides to throw an extra-special graduation party for Kendall and Kylie; Kim's pregnancy cravings take her halfway around the world, but it could be putting her at risk; Khloé responds to a presence in her house by getting in touch with her psychic side.
149	4	"All Grown Up"	December 6, 2015	2.31
Kris has a reason to meet Caitlyn for the first time at Kylie's 18th birthday; Kim takes over Kris's home in preparation for baby number two; Khloé takes steps to move forward.
150	5	"Lions and Tigers and Texts"	December 13, 2015	2.05
After moving forward with her divorce, Khloé seeks solace in Mexico City at the big cat rescue foundation with Kendall; Kris has on her own separate correspondence with Lamar; Kylie makes her first appearance as an adult in a club in Montreal.
151	6	"Non-Bon Voyage"	December 20, 2015	1.89
The family flies to St. Barths to forget their troubles, but drama follows them; Kourtney gets disturbing news about Scott; Kendall has beef with Kylie for bringing her boyfriend Tyga; Kris struggles to get back on Kim and Khloé's good side.
152	7	"Return From Paradise"	January 3, 2016	2.54
Kendall feels neglected when Kylie continues to give Tyga all her attention. Kim and Khloé make it their mission to make Kourtney feel good. An unexpected visit from Scott triggers a whirlwind of emotions when the family finally sits down with Scott to discuss the mistakes he made.
153	8	"The Big Launch"	January 10, 2016	2.05
The Kardashian and Jenner girls travel to New York to launch their new apps.
154	9	"Fear of the Unknown"	January 17, 2016	2.15
Kris wants the girls to take a genetic test to know their risks for cancer, but not everyone is on board; Kendall has a hard time finding a balance in her relationship with Caitlyn; the family helps Scott as he hits a low point.
155	10	"Miscommunication"	January 24, 2016	1.99
Kris decides the family needs Communication Therapy; Kylie is ready to celebrate her new home but her family's bossy ways get in the way of her plans; Khloé struggles to finish her book.
156	11	"The Great Kris"	January 31, 2016	1.89
Kim leads the planning for a grand 60th birthday party for Kris but is afraid she may have taken on too much at nine months pregnant; Scott finally goes into rehab, but only time will tell if he is ready to change.
157	12	"Family First"	February 14, 2016	1.69
The girls remake a legendary family video for Kris's epic 60th birthday bash; Khloé has a hard time finding a balance between supporting Lamar and returning to her daily life; Kendall gets an amazing opportunity.
158	13	"Unforeseen Future"	February 21, 2016	1.90
Kim learns that her house construction is delayed even further, leaving her living situation in limbo; Scott comes back from rehab ready to prove he is a changed man; Kylie confronts Kendall about being a team.

=== Season 12 (2016) ===
No. overall	No. in season	Title	Original release date	US viewers (millions)
159	1	"Out With the Old, In With the New"	May 1, 2016	3.19
News that Rob is dating Tyga's ex is met with shock from the family. Meanwhile, Khloé rearranges her life to make sure that Lamar has proper care and a house of his own; Scott hopes some lifestyle changes could win Kourtney back; at the same time, Kourtney tries to embrace this new chapter of her life.
160	2	"A New York Family Affair"	May 8, 2016	1.56
Kanye takes some of the whole family to New York for the launch of Yeezy Season 3. Lamar decides to go with the family making his first public outing. He is met with cheers from the crowd. Khloé and Caitlyn start to resolve their feud.
161	3	"Significant Others and Significant Brothers"	May 15, 2016	1.77
Khloé is shocked when she learns Rob has a house of his own and questions Kris into whether she was responsible for buying it. Rob returns and moves into his new home with support from the rest of the family except Khloé. The family start to notice Kourtney's diva ways especially since appearing on the cover of Architectural Digest. Kim also notices her budding friendship with Corey and confronts her about it.
162	4	"All About Meme"	May 22, 2016	1.55
The girls start to make peace with Rob's new relationship, but feelings get hurt when Rob starts making jokes on social media. Meanwhile, Kris and Kim reach their breaking points as housemates and Kendall struggles with feeling left out.
163	5	"Fake It 'Til You Make It"	June 5, 2016	1.78
Kendall, Kylie and Khloé get prosthetic makeovers in hopes of having a normal day out; Scott feels insecure about his place in the family; Kris resists Corey's idea of fun.
164	6	"The Kardashian Curse"	June 12, 2016	1.53
Khloé travels to Napa with Kourtney and Kris, where she needs to make a decision about her divorce; Scott tries to rid himself of the alleged Kardashian curse.
165	7	"Snow You Didn't – Part 1"	June 19, 2016	1.27
Kris surprises the family with a Vail, Colo. vacation; the family learns that Rob has proposed to Blac Chyna; Kourtney worries about Scott's behavior.
166	8	"Snow You Didn't! – Part 2"	June 26, 2016	1.23
The family continues their vacation in Vail, while taking in the news of Rob's engagement; Scott tries to stay on his best behavior for the rest of the trip.
167	9	"Oh Baby!"	July 3, 2016	1.51
After the announcement of his engagement, Rob has another piece of news that will change the family forever; Kylie struggles with anxiety from being in the spotlight.
168	10	"Iced Out"	July 10, 2016	1.44
Kim feels like she is being pulled in different directions as she tries to cater to both her sister and her husband during a trip; Scott tries to decide if he should surprise Kourtney by showing up in Iceland.
169	11	"Got MILF?"	July 17, 2016	1.37
Kim feels that Kanye is constantly misunderstood and unfairly vilified and can't decide whether to publicly take a stand for him; Kim prepares for her sexy cameo in Fergie's music video.
170	12	"Havana Good Day"	July 31, 2016	1.39
The girls head off on an unforgettable trip to the once-restricted country of Cuba; Kourtney fights with family members; Kris loses it when she can't speak to the girls overseas.
171	13	"Havana Good Night"	August 7, 2016	1.17
The Kardashian trip to Cuba continues. A disagreement results from Kim's commitment to her work engagements on Mother's Day; Scott comes down with a major case of FOMO; and tensions rise over Kylie's Puma endorsement.
172	14	"The Digital Rage"	August 21, 2016	1.43
Drama between Rob and the family flares up when Chyna launches an app they find questionable; Scott is on a mission to prove that Kourtney's allergies aren't real.
173	15	"Blood, Sweat, and Fears"	August 28, 2016	0.866
When Kris sees Khloé is struggling, she urges Rob to reconnect with his sister; Kourtney worries that she will give Scott mixed messages; Kris pushes herself too far in order to keep up with her daughters' workouts.
174	16	"Love at First Fight"	September 4, 2016	1.52
When Rob and Chyna get in a fight, it's up to the sisters to help repair their relationship; the family tries to give Khloé a good birthday; and Kourtney is nervous when she has to do a press tour all by herself.
175	17	"Khloé's New Breast Friends"	October 23, 2016	1.45
Kim upsets her mother after helping Cait get ready for the ESPY awards; Khloe tests out her new features; Scott finds a healthier way to keep himself busy.
176	18	"Lord Disick Returns"	October 30, 2016	1.10
MJ's birthday is celebrated, but Rob doesn't show up and disappears after a fight with Chyna; The Kardashians want Scott to have more fun, which leads to the return of "Lord Disick"; Kim has trouble doing North's hair.
177	19	"Lord of the Cougars"	November 6, 2016	1.12
Kendall's sleep paralysis takes a toll on work and travel; Kim tries to control her anxiety; Scott becomes friends with Kris and her girlfriends.
178	20	"Controversies & Legacies"	November 13, 2016	1.22
Kim is trying anything for a third child; Kendall is afraid of backlash from supporting stricter gun control; Kris has a hard time realizing her mother won't be around forever. She sets up an interview where she and her kids ask her mother questions. Kris breaks down.
179	21	"No Good Deeds"	November 20, 2016	1.14
A baby shower is planned for Rob and Chyna, but a fight ruins the occasion; Kris gets in a car accident.

=== Season 13 (2017) ===
No. overall	No. in season	Title	Original release date	US viewers (millions)
180	1	"Time to Dash"	March 12, 2017	1.48
During a trip to Miami, a major department store makes an offer to purchase Dash, leading Kim, Kourtney and Khloé to argue about the future of their stores. Meanwhile, Kourtney struggles to enjoy herself while in Scott’s presence; and Khloé keeps Kim in the dark about her new relationship.
181	2	"Paris"	March 19, 2017	1.58
Kourtney is eager to experience Paris Fashion Week with Kim and see Kendall walk the runway for the first time, but their trip to the city of love takes a dark turn when Kim is robbed at gunpoint.
182	3	"The Aftermath"	March 26, 2017	1.41
After Paris, Kim struggles to cope with scary reminders of the robbery, Kendall questions her decision to prosecute a trespasser, and Kris focuses on increasing security for the family.
183	4	"Kim's Last Ditch Effort"	April 2, 2017	1.16
Kim undergoes one final procedure on her uterus in an attempt to carry another baby, but suffers from dangerous complications; Khloé worries about her business successes; Rob must learn to ignore criticism from his family.
184	5	"When It Rains, It Pours – Part 1"	April 9, 2017	1.26
Kim begins to ease back into her public life, but is blindsided by some upsetting news about Kanye. Meanwhile, Khloé is pressured to mend her strained relationship with Cait; the family speculate about Kourtney and Scott getting back together after an intimate trip to Mexico; and Rob welcomes his first baby.
185	6	"When It Rains, It Pours – Part 2"	April 16, 2017	1.17
After receiving some troubling news about Kanye while in New York for the Angel Ball, Kim rushes home to his aid; Kendall worries that a bad review from Vogue could jeopardise her modelling career; Khloé clashes with Malika over priorities.
186	7	"The Ex Files"	April 23, 2017	1.47
After a fight with Chyna, the sisters try to protect Rob from a toxic relationship. Kris tries to rebuild her relationship with Caitlyn and Kim tries to convince Khloé to make an ex-box.
187	8	"Guilt Trip"	April 30, 2017	1.34
Scott is devastated when he hears a rumour about Kourtney; Kim is back to work and fears she might not be cut out for her public lifestyle anymore; Kendall gets upset with Caitlyn when her efforts to spend time with her dad are taken for granted.
188	9	"Family Trippin' – Part 1"	May 7, 2017	1.25
After Kim busts Scott with a girl in Dubai, the family is surprised Kourtney allowed him on the family trip; the sisters discover Scott has invited yet another girl to join him in Costa Rica, the family decides it’s time for Kourtney to confront him.
189	10	"Family Trippin' – Part 2"	May 14, 2017	1.37
The family confronts Scott about his unwelcome guest; Kourtney informs him that he’s ruined any chance of getting back together; Khloé is fed up with her family’s attitude; Kim anxiously prepares to testify against the men who robbed her in Paris.
190	11	"Classic Cars and Vintage Eggs"	May 21, 2017	1.33
Kim and Kourtney force Khloé to take a sentimental sister trip to Palm Springs to relive some of their fondest childhood memories; to save his relationship, Rob meets with a life coach; Kris receives an outrageous proposition from a royal family.
191	12	"Decisions, Decisions"	May 28, 2017	0.97
Rob struggles to find a way to be civil with Chyna for their daughter; Khloé puts Kourtney through a series of silly tests to cure her indecisiveness; Kim jets to New York with Kylie for Kanye’s highly-anticipated Yeezy fashion show.
192	13	"Loyalties and Royalties"	June 4, 2017	1.43
Kim becomes torn over maintaining a relationship with Cait; she confirms that her mom’s reason for cutting ties is valid; Kendall introduces her sisters to the first openly gay royal; Rob implements his own time of the month.
193	14	"Sister Surrogacy"	June 11, 2017	1.40
Khloé explores the possibility of becoming Kim’s surrogate but receives some shocking news about her own fertility in the process; the sisters pressure Kourtney to step up her flirting game; Rob threatens to bail on his 30th birthday

=== Season 14 (2017-18) ===
No. overall	No. in season	Title	Original release date	US viewers (millions)
194	1	"Cleveland Show"	October 1, 2017	1.44
Kim and Kourtney finally get a glimpse into Khloé’s private life in Cleveland. Kendall receives some harsh feedback on a recent project. The family is blindsided when Cait reveals some shocking news.
195	2	"MILFs Gone Wild"	October 8, 2017	1.40
Scott gets jealous when Kourtney goes on a girls trip to Mexico for her birthday. Kim feels violated when some unflattering photos of her in Mexico surface on the Internet.
196	3	"Cheers To That"	October 15, 2017	1.26
Kim struggles to regain her confidence after her trip to Mexico. Khloé’s spirits sour when Kris becomes too busy for mother-daughter bonding. Kourtney acts sneaky about her dating life.
197	4	"Clothes Quarters"	October 22, 2017	1.13
Kourtney is distracted during a sister getaway with Kendall; Kim stages an unwelcome intervention on Khloé’s wardrobe.
198	5	"Catch Me If You Cannes"	October 29, 2017	0.89
Scott threatens to ruin Kourtney’s trip to Cannes with her new romantic interest, Kim struggles to set boundaries with her assistant, and the girls get educated about Planned Parenthood.
199	6	"Fan-Friction"	November 5, 2017	1.15
Khloé fears that Cleveland fans may turn on her family during a trip to see Tristan; the girls wonder how to treat Scott after his bad behavior in Cannes; Kim gets fed up with her lack of willpower and makes a drastic lifestyle change.
200	7	"Beauty Queen"	November 12, 2017	1.01
Layarstar Kim anxiously preps for the launch of her new KKW Beauty line; Kourtney tries to adopt a new positive attitude; Khloé scrambles to make arrangements for Tristan’s upcoming move to LA.
201	8	"Close To Home"	November 19, 2017	0.77
Kim is shocked to learn about the rising rate of homelessness in LA and sets out to bring awareness to the growing crisis. Meanwhile Kris hires a scribe to document her every word.
202	9	"Dog Tired"	December 3, 2017	0.96
Khloé and Kendall consider getting guns for protection; Kris imposes strict guidelines for her mom to follow in her new condo; Kim can’t handle her rambunctious new puppy.
203	10	"Baby One More Time"	December 10, 2017	1.06
Kim gets some big news about the future of her family; the girls wonder if Kourtney sees a future with her current beau; Kim and Khloé compete to win Kris’s affection.
204	11	"Press Pass"	December 17, 2017	1.03
Khloé and Kourtney butt heads over the design of their fitness line; Kim thinks the family needs media training to learn to handle controversial topics.
205	12	"My Mother's Keeper"	January 7, 2018	1.05
Khloé's explosive temper threatens to get her into trouble, and Kris places a tracking device on her mother. Meanwhile, Kim doubts the health benefits of Kourtney's new gluten free diet.
206	13	"Mime Over Matter"	January 14, 2018	1.44
A guilt-ridden Kourtney must decide whether to take a trip to Egypt without her kids; Khloé recognizes that the stress of dealing with six kids is weighing on Kris, so she hires a mime to cheer her mom up.
207	14	"Bun In The Oven"	January 15, 2018	1.33
Khloé and Tristan find out exciting news about their future, but that is nearly overshadowed by Khloé and Corey's issues with one another. Kris gets a complex for her ever changing earlobes.
208	15	"Diamonds Are Forever"	January 21, 2018	1.16
Scott's behaviour takes a turn for the worse after learning that Kourtney officially has a boyfriend. Meanwhile Kourtney struggles to find her career passion, and Kris comes up with a creative way to preserve her memory long after she's gone.
209	16	"A Tangled Web"	February 11, 2018	1.14
Kim fears for her surrogate's safety when sources begin exposing her personal information; Kris keeps a watchful eye on Scott during Fashion Week; Kourtney deals with a scary infestation.
210	17	"Kris Jenner's Legacy"	February 18, 2018	1.05
When Scott realises that the girls know very little about Kris's history, he sets out to make her a commemorative legacy video. Kendall's anxiety strikes again right before Milan Fashion Week. Khloé attempts to rebuild her friendship with Malika.
211	18	"Trimester Trouble"	February 25, 2018	1.01
Khloé attempts to keep her pregnancy a secret while dealing with some complications. Kourtney questions whether she's done having kids. Kris debuts a loud new hairdo.
212	19	"The Gender Reveal"	March 4, 2018	1.29
The girls take one last sister getaway to San Francisco before their babies arrive, but they quickly tire of Kourtney's bad attitude; Kim wants to include her family in the surrogacy process; Khloé anxiously awaits news of her baby's gender.

=== Season 15 (2018) ===
No. overall	No. in season	Title	Original release date	US viewers (millions)
213	1	"Photo Shoot Dispute"	August 5, 2018	1.36
A fight over the family Christmas card escalates into a major feud for the family. Meanwhile, Scott feels guilty for moving on to a new relationship.
214	2	"The Art of the Prank"	August 12, 2018	1.27
Kim and Khloé try to find out the reason for Kourtney's bad attitude; Khloé and Scott come up with an idea to prove that Kris isn't the art expert she claims to be.
215	3	"Drop Dead Gorgeous"	August 19, 2018	1.08
Kris worries that pregnant Khloé is taking her healthy lifestyle too far. Meanwhile, Kim takes her morbid fascination to the next level.
216	4	"The Nightmare Before Christmas"	August 26, 2018	1.03
After an intense few weeks of fighting with her sisters, Kourtney considers spending the holidays away from her family; Khloé hides from the critical public eye until her pregnancy announcement; Kris fears she's being poisoned.
217	5	"The Family Feud"	September 9, 2018	1.07
Kourtney is upset when Scott introduces the kids to his girlfriend without Kourtney's permission; the family are determined to redeem themselves on Celebrity Family Feud.
218	6	"We Love Chicago"	September 16, 2018	0.91
Kim prepares for the birth of her third child, Khloé struggles to choose a godparent for her baby, and Kourtney makes her dancing debut in a flash mob.
219	7	"The Perfect Stormi"	September 23, 2018	1.08
Even though things are changing for the Kardashian family in ways they never expected, they are determined to remember that family always comes first.
220	8	"An American Model in Paris"	September 30, 2018	1.01
Kourtney is furious when Kim leaks some personal information about her to the family; Kim struggles to make Kanye a priority; Kendall lets loose on a whirlwind trip to Paris.
221	9	"The Kardashians Take Japan"	October 7, 2018	0.81
Kim scrambles to shoot an entire Yeezy Season 7 campaign while in Japan, but worries that her sisters' questionable fashion sense might jeopardize the debut of the line; Kris gifts her best friend with a face-lift.
222	10	"Let's Play Ball"	October 14, 2018	0.87
The Kardashians and the Jacksons face off in a softball game for charity; Kris gathers resources in order to renovate the Watts Empowerment Center; Khloé and Scott attempt to uncover the true identity of Art Vandelay.
223	11	"The Lord & His Lady"	October 28, 2018	0.88
Inspired by the March for Our Lives demonstration, Kim meets with the survivors of the Parkland shooting to learn about their movement; Scott revives his podcast with Khloé in Cleveland; Kylie feels insecure about her post-baby body.
224	12	"The Betrayal"	November 4, 2018	1.13
Khloé is blindsided by news about her relationship just days before her due date; Kim worries that Khloé's delivery will fall on the day of her high-school reunion; Scott and Kendall team up to do some extreme sports.
225	13	"True Story"	November 18, 2018	1.22
The family rushes to Khloé's side as she gives birth and comes face-to-face with Tristan after news of his infidelity broke; Kim reconnects with friends at her 20-year high school reunion.
226	14	"Vegas, Baby!"	November 25, 2018	1.10
Khloé and Tristan head back to Los Angeles with baby True, but Kim and Tristan have unresolved tension over his infidelity; Kourtney travels to Washington, DC, to speak in front of Congress.
227	15	"Stacking the Deck"	December 2, 2018	0.94
Kim returns to Paris for the first time since the robbery. Meanwhile, Kourtney worries she waited too long to freeze her eggs and Kendall is afraid she'll humiliate herself in a charity poker tournament.
228	16	"Break Free"	December 9, 2018	0.85
Kim devotes her time and energy to helping free Alice Johnson from prison; Khloé stresses about spending her first night away from True; Kim finds herself dealing with some controversial comments.

=== Season 16 (2019) ===
No. overall	No. in season	Title	Original release date	US viewers (millions)
229	1	"Chicago Loyalty"	March 31, 2019	1.30
Kim's loyalty to her husband becomes a source of conflict while on a trip to Chicago; Kourtney struggles with anxiety in the aftermath of her breakup; so her sisters decide to plan a girls trip to Palm Springs, Calif. to cure her breakup blues.
230	2	"Kourtney's Choice"	April 7, 2019	1.13
Kim invites Scott to a family trip to New York to show Kourtney how far he has come as a family man. Meanwhile, Kim also contemplates an unexpected move to Chicago, and Kris fears her mother might be seriously ill.
231	3	"Eat Pray Fight"	April 21, 2019	0.90
The family heads to Bali for a relaxing vacation, but tensions flare when Kourtney accuses Khloé of complaining too much. Meanwhile, Scott is determined to find buried treasure and enlists the help of his kids.
232	4	"Soul(mate) Searching"	April 28, 2019	1.03
While on a spiritual quest to find balance in Bali, Kourtney gets some news that makes her consider a future with Scott. Meanwhile, Kim and Khloé are determined to have an insightful psychic reading.
233	5	"Legally Brunette"	May 5, 2019	0.83
Kim decides to follow in her father's footsteps and pursue her dream of becoming a lawyer. Kourtney worries that Mason is growing up too fast, while Scott encourages Khloé to resurrect her career as an artist.
234	6	"Fire Escape"	May 12, 2019	0.88
Wildfires erupt in the neighborhood and the families are forced to leave their homes; Kim and her team await word on whether or not the president will endorse their prison reform legislation; Kris stars in an Ariana Grande music video.
235	7	"Pet Peeve"	May 26, 2019	0.90
Khloé's mistrust of her mother's boyfriend resurfaces on a family trip to Palm Springs, leaving Kris hurt and confused. Meanwhile, Kendall must find a way to tell Kourtney that she has overstayed her welcome, and Khloé secretly gifts North a new pet.
236	8	"Unhappy Camper"	June 2, 2019	1.01
Kim puts her survival skills to the test on a camping trip in the wilderness with North, and Malika begins to suspect Khloé may be struggling with some relationship issues. Meanwhile, Scott is determined to take his clothing brand to the next level.
237	9	"Christmas Chaos"	June 9, 2019	0.99
Kris reluctantly allows Kim to take over the annual Christmas Eve party; Khloé must come to the rescue when North's hamster dies; Kris tries to understand the unconventional relationship between Kourtney, Scott and his girlfriend.
238	10	"Heavy Meddle"	June 16, 2019	0.97
Khloé tries to mediate a fight between Kourtney and Kendall, but ends up making matters worse; Kim continues searching for a cure for her psoriasis; Kris makes herself at home in Kylie's new office space, so Kylie must show her mom who is boss.
239	11	"Treachery"	June 23, 2019	1.32
Khloé deals with some debilitating health issues, but her world is turned upside down when rumors surface that Tristan cheated with family friend Jordyn Woods; Kanye brings his family and friends together to celebrate the healing power of music.
240	12	"Aftershock"	June 30, 2019	1.40
Kim and Kourtney take Khloé on a getaway to help her cope with the news; Khloé's anger reaches a boiling point when she learns that Jordyn is speaking publicly about what happened, causing her to lash out.

=== Season 17 (2019) ===
No. overall	No. in season	Title	Original release date	US viewers (millions)
241	1	"Birthdays and Bad News Part 1"	September 8, 2019	1.07
Khloé invites her ex to True's first birthday party; Khloé decides to throw Kourtney a birthday party, but Kourtney's anxiety about turning 40 threatens to ruin the celebration; Kim receives a devastating medical diagnosis that could change her life.
242	2	"Birthdays and Bad News Part 2"	September 15, 2019	1.05
After an uncomfortable confrontation with her ex at True's first birthday, Khloé must figure out how to coexist with her ex; Kim accuses Kourtney of copying her style; Kim searches for answers regarding a frightening medical diagnosis.
243	3	"Cruel and Unusual Punishment"	September 22, 2019	0.99
Kourtney and Scott seek parenting advice, but Corey's input causes an argument; Khloé plans a wine-tasting trip to Napa to check in with Kylie; the family is fed up with Kim's new intense security protocol, so they take matters into their own hands.
244	4	"Three's Company"	October 6, 2019	0.86
Scott feels under pressure to make sure both Kourtney and his girlfriend Sofia are happy on a family trip to Finland.
245	5	"Have You Met Kim?"	October 13, 2019	0.98
Kim has the busiest week of her life as she prepares for the birth of her fourth baby, stars in a music video with Paris Hilton, and heads to the Met Gala; Kourtney realizes someone close to her family has been stealing from her.
246	6	"Psalm West"	October 20, 2019	1.03
After the birth of her son, Psalm, Kim plans a surprise vow renewal ceremony for her husband to celebrate five years of marriage. When Kourtney's friends can't get along on a girls trip to Turks and Caicos, she must salvage the vacation.
247	7	"The Ex-Factor"	October 27, 2019	0.92
Khloé's ex-husband Lamar releases a memoir; an old rumour resurfaces and Kris worries that it will spark a fight between her and Khloé; Kim is nervous to speak at a live press conference at the White House.
248	8	"Rumour Has It"	November 3, 2019	0.76
Kris is furious when some slanderous rumours circulate on the 25th anniversary of her friend's murder; Kim struggles to disconnect from work while on a trip to Costa Rica; some of Khloé's past insecurities resurface when she attends her first prom.
249	9	"Hard Candy"	November 17, 2019	0.94
Kim and Kourtney plan a joint birthday party for their daughters; Kris is concerned about some of Khloé's obsessive behavior; after criticism over the name of her shapewear line, Kim faces a difficult decision about the future of her company.
250	10	"Gifted"	December 1, 2019	0.99
When Tristan starts showering Khloé with gifts, she worries his grand gestures are an effort to win her back; after Kim and Kourtney learn that people are being sickened by toxic waste in a nearby community, they vow to help.
251	11	"The Show Must Go On"	December 8, 2019	0.89
Kim and Khloé are furious that Kourtney is hiding aspects of her life from the cameras and attempt to fire her from the show; Kim helps a young man recently out of prison with his future.
252	12	"Cattle Drive Me Crazy"	December 15, 2019	0.97
Kris takes the family to Wyoming to ease recent tensions and strengthen their bonds, but her plan backfires when the girls start fighting on the trip; Kendall is excited to spend some much-needed bonding time with Kylie.

=== Season 18 (2020) ===
No. overall	No. in season	Title	Original release date	US viewers (millions)
253	1	"Fights, Friendships, And Fashion Week Part 1"	March 26, 2020	1.07
Kim becomes too friendly with Khloé’s ex. Kylie prepares to debut her Kylie Cosmetics collaboration with Balmain at Paris Fashion Week. Tension boils over when Kim and Khloé confront Kourtney over her recent attitude.
254	2	"Fights, Friendships, and Fashion Week Part 2"	April 2, 2020	1.04
In the aftermath of their fight, Kim and Kourtney head to Armenia to baptize their kids; realizing that her lifestyle is making her unhappy, Kourtney considers making a major change; Kylie is too sick to fulfill her work obligations in Paris.
255	3	"Date My Daughter"	April 9, 2020	0.91
Kris is at a sexual peak in her relationship, and she feels guilty about Khloé going through a dry spell; she tries to push her to date again; Scott panics over an upcoming speaking engagement.
256	4	"In the Blink of an Eye"	April 16, 2020	0.87
Khloé wrestles with whether to send her daughter to Cleveland to visit Tristan; Kylie considers undergoing a scary medical procedure; Scott and Khloé plan their next prank on Kris, which will top all previous pranks.
257	5	"Surprise, Surprise"	April 23, 2020	0.80
During a whirlwind week of birthdays, Khloé and Kim plan an epic surprise to celebrate Corey; Khloé must choose between freezing her eggs and making embryos with her ex; Kim races against the clock to help an incarcerated man.
258	6	"Family Matters"	April 30, 2020	0.81
When Kim reveals she no longer wants to host the annual Christmas Eve party, the family feuds over holiday plans; Scott struggles to talk about his parents when reunited with a relative from his past; Khloé fills in as Kris's assistant.

=== Season 19 (2020) ===
No. overall	No. in season	Title	Original release date	US viewers (millions)
259	1	"Growing Pains"	September 17, 2020	0.67
While Khloé plans a baby shower for her best friend, Malika wrestles with the reality of becoming a single parent; Kourtney gets into cuddling and breaks out of her comfort zone by forcing herself to be more affectionate.
260	2	"Paris, Puppies and Pranks"	September 24, 2020	0.70
As concerns begin to grow over the COVID-19 virus, Kim and Kourtney head to Paris for the Yeezy Season 8 launch.
261	3	"Journey to Healing"	October 1, 2020	0.57″
Scott experiences some troubling health issues and Kim heads to Washington to meet with some formerly incarcerated women. Khloé is determined to cure Kim of her fear of spiders.
262	4	"Trouble in Palm Springs"	October 8, 2020	0.68
Kris plans a daughter-bonding getaway to Palm Springs, but Kendall and Kylie's big fight derails the trip; Scott ruins one of Kris's antiques, and gets Mason to help him with the cover-up.
263	5	"Sister, Sister and a Babymoon"	October 15, 2020	0.57
Khloé takes her bestie on one last trip before her due date, but worries that some issues with Malika's baby daddy might send her friend into early labour. The family deals with the fallout of Kendall and Kylie's big fight in Palm Springs.
264	6	"Things Fall Apart: COVID-19"	October 29, 2020	0.80
As L.A. prepares for a potential lockdown, Khloé falls ill and worries that she may have Covid-19. Malika goes into labour and cannot bring her support system to the hospital. Kris is devastated that she cannot safely be with her mom.
265	7	"Losing it in Lockdown"	November 5, 2020	0.61
Kim struggles to balance work life and mom life in quarantine, while Khloé gets creative to keep herself entertained. The family encourages Kendall and Kylie to reconcile after their argument in Palm Springs.
266	8	"Love Lockdown"	November 12, 2020	0.73
Khloé feels pressured to make a decision about her romantic future with Tristan; Scott heads to a treatment centre to work on his health and the facility leaks photos of him; the family finds creative ways to celebrate each other's birthdays.

=== Season 20 (2021) ===
No. overall	No. in season	Title	Original release date	US viewers (millions)
267	1	"Beginnings and Endings"	March 18, 2021	0.84
Khloe and Tristan face roadblocks while expanding their family; Scott faces decisions about his relationship; Kim prepares for a test that will determine her future as a lawyer.
268	2	"No Comment"	March 25, 2021	0.60
After Scott accidentally causes speculation that Khloé and Tristan are back together, Khloé is overwhelmed by the backlash online.
269	3	"Winner Take All"	April 1, 2021	0.54
Kim and Khloé think old flames are reigniting between Kourtney and Scott and set them up on a romantic date; the Kardashian girls challenge the Jenners to an obstacle course to determine which side of the family is more athletic.
270	4	"New Friends and the Bunker"	April 8, 2021	0.80
Kim and Khloe are curious about Kourtney's new friend Addison Rae. Scared by the state of the world, Kim takes measures to prepare for the future, while Kris is afraid to let her mom celebrate her birthday during a pandemic.
271	5	"Great Ex-pectations"	April 15, 2021	0.67
Kourtney sets boundaries with her Poosh team when the line between business and friendship becomes blurred; Caitlyn reaches out to Kris for some help with a business venture.
272	6	"Summer of Love"	April 22, 2021	0.61
Scott finally admits he's still in love with Kourtney; Khloé sets out in search of a homeless man who made a lasting impact on her years ago; Kim enlists the help of a professional to make her TikTok dancing debut.
273	7	"The End Of An Era"	May 6, 2021	0.56
The family makes a big decision about the future of the show and reflects on how "Keeping Up" will be an end of an era; Kris goes on a girls' trip to decompress from the decision.
274	8	"Season of Change"	May 13, 2021	0.52
Khloè runs into some unexpected obstacles while exploring surrogacy; Scott worries that the family will drift apart now that the show is coming to an end; Kim is determined to figure out who is behind the satirical social media page NorisBlackBook.
275	9	"Keeping Up With the Kids"	May 20, 2021	0.58
When Tristan realises that Khloe is stressed about her living situation, he takes steps to make her feel more comfortable; the family realises that they collectively have a problem with negativity stemming from their matriarch, Kris Jenner.
276	10	"Birthdays and Bad News"	May 27, 2021	0.59
While planning an over-the-top birthday surprise for her mom, Kim receives some bad news about her legal studies.
277	11	"The End Part 1"	June 3, 2021	0.52
The family departs on one last family trip to Lake Tahoe, where they relive some of their fondest memories from the show; Kim deals with some turbulence in her marriage.
278	12	"The End Part 2"	June 10, 2021	0.68
The Kardashians bury a time capsule to commemorate their years on the show and Kim updates the family on her future as they say farewell.
279	13	"The Final Curtain Part 1"	June 17, 2021	0.76
The Kardashian-Jenners sit down with Andy Cohen to revisit some of the most talked-about moments and unanswered questions from all 20 seasons of "Keeping Up With the Kardashians."
280	14	"The Final Curtain Part 2"	June 20, 2021	0.67
The Kardashian-Jenners sit down with Andy Cohen to revisit some of the most talked-about moments and unanswered questions from all 20 seasons of "Keeping Up With the Kardashians."

== Specials ==
No. of special	Season aired in	Title	Aired between	Original release date	US viewers (millions)
1	2	"Junk in the Trunk"	"New Perspective in New Orleans" "Free Khloé"	May 26, 2008	N/A
Kourtney, Kim, Khloé, and Rob share their favorite moments and outtakes from the series.
2	5	"Junk in the Trunk 2"	"The Kardashians Take NYC" "Family VS Money"	December 20, 2010	N/A
The Kardashians look back at their favorite moments from the series and view some previously-unaired footage.
3	7	"Dishing It Out"	"Baby, Baby, Baby" "We're Having a Baby"	October 28, 2012	1.46
The Kardashians show never before seen footage and share some of their favorite moments from the series.
4	14	"10th Anniversary Special"	"Sister Surrogacy" "Cleveland Show"	September 24, 2017	1.26
Ryan Seacrest sits down with Kris, Kourtney, Kimberly, Khloe, Kendall, Kylie and Scott to reflect back on the most monumental events in their lives.
5	14	"A Very Kardashian Holiday"	"Close To Home" "Dog Tired	November 26, 2017	1.04
The Kardashians prepare for the holiday season bigger and better than ever before.
6	19	"Celebration Continues: Happy 40th Birthday, Kim!"	"Sister, Sister and a Babymoon" "Things Fall Apart: COVID-19"	October 21, 2020	N/A
The family celebrates Kim’s 40th birthday.
