= Keeping Up with the Kardashians season 16 =

Keeping Up with the Kardashians
- Season 16
- No. of episodes: 12

Release
- Original network: E!
- Original release: March 31 – June 30, 2019

Keeping Up with the Kardashians is an American reality television series that airs on the E! cable network. The show focuses on the personal and professional lives of the Kardashian–Jenner blended family. Its premise originated with Ryan Seacrest, who also serves as an executive producer. The series debuted on October 14, 2007 and has subsequently become one of the longest-running reality television series in the country. The sixteenth season premiered on March 31, 2019.

== Cast ==
=== Main cast ===
- Kim Kardashian
- Kourtney Kardashian
- Khloé Kardashian
- Kendall Jenner
- Kylie Jenner
- Kris Jenner
- Scott Disick
- Kanye West

=== Recurring cast ===
- MJ Shannon
- Corey Gamble
- Larsa Pippen
- Jonathan Cheban
- Malika Haqq
- Mason Disick
- North West
- Penelope Disick
- Reign Disick

== Development and production ==
On August 24, 2017, it was announced the family had signed a $150 million deal with E!.

On August 20, 2018, Kim Kardashian announced on Twitter that the family will begin filming Season 16 the following week.

== Ratings ==
The 16th season finale of E!’s “Keeping Up With the Kardashians” finished as the show’s most-watched episode in nearly three years.

The episode, which showcased the fallout of the cheating scandal plaguing Khloé Kardashian’s relationship with Tristan Thompson, delivered 2.4 million total viewers with three days of delayed viewing factored in, according to Nielsen. That’s the biggest audience for an episode of “KUWTK” since Season 12.

Overall, the season averaged 1.9 million total viewers, a seven percent increase from last season. Among adult viewers under 50, the season was up five percent overall, at 1.2 million.

=== Season 16 (2019) ===
No. overall	No. in season	Title	Original release date	US viewers (millions)
231	1	"Chicago Loyalty"	March 31, 2019	1.30
Kim's fierce loyalty to Kanye becomes a source of conflict while on a trip to Chicago. Kourtney struggles with anxiety in the aftermath of her breakup, so Khloe decides to plan a girls trip to Palm Springs to cure her breakup blues. MJ feels neglected by her daughter, Kris.
232	2	"Kourtney's Choice"	April 7, 2019	1.13
Kim plans a trip to New York for Kanye’s appearance on Saturday Night Live for Yandhi to show Kourtney how far Scott has come as a family man. Kim also contemplates an unexpected move to Chicago. Kris fears that MJ might be seriously ill.
233	3	"Eat Pray Fight"	April 21, 2019	0.90
The family heads to Bali for a relaxing vacation, but tensions flare when Kourtney accuses Khloe of complaining too much. Scott is determined to find buried treasure and enlists the help of his kids. Back in LA, Kendall and Kylie help Kris take care of MJ.
234	4	"Soul(mate) Searching"	April 28, 2019	1.03
While on a spiritual quest to find balance in Bali, Kourtney gets some news that makes her consider a future with Scott. Kim and Khloe are determined to have an insightful psychic reading but get more than they bargained for.
235	5	"Legally Brunette"	May 5, 2019	0.83
Kim decides to follow in her father Robert Kardashian’s footsteps and pursue her lifelong dream of becoming a lawyer, but worries she may have taken on more than she can handle. Kourtney worries that Mason is growing up too fast and won't want to spend time with her anymore, and Scott encourages Khloe to resurrect her career as an artist.
236	6	"Fire Escape"	May 12, 2019	0.88
When devastating wildfires erupt in their neighborhood, the family is forced to flee from their homes, threatening to ruin the fairytale birthday party Rob is planning for his daughter Dream. Kim and her team anxiously await the president's word on whether or not he will endorse their groundbreaking prison reform legislation, and Kris Jenner stars in Ariana Grande's music video, Thank U, Next.
237	7	"Pet Peeve"	May 26, 2019	0.90
Khloe's mistrust of her mother's boyfriend Corey Gamble resurfaces on a very awkward family trip to Palm Springs, leaving Kris hurt and confused about her daughter's behavior. Kendall invites Kourtney and her kids to stay with her after evacuating from their home due to the fires, but when Kourtney shows no signs of leaving, Kendall must find a way to tell her that she's overstayed her welcome. Kim is furious when she learns Khloe has secretly gifted North a new pet.
238	8	"Unhappy Camper"	June 2, 2019	1.01
Kim puts her survival skills to the test on an overnight camping trip in the wilderness with North; Malika begins to suspect Khloe may be struggling with some relationship issues; Scott is determined to take his clothing brand to the next level.
239	9	"Christmas Chaos"	June 9, 2019	0.99
Kris reluctantly allows Kim to take over the annual Christmas Eve Party, but the holiday is in jeopardy when Kris learns Kim has invited an unwelcome guest, Caitlyn Jenner. Khloe must come to the rescue when North's beloved hamster unexpectedly dies and Kim can't deal. Kris is determined to understand the unconventional relationship between Kourtney, Scott, and his girlfriend Sofia after the three are seen vacationing together in Mexico.
240	10	"Heavy Meddle"	June 16, 2019	0.97
Khloe tries to mediate a fight between Kourtney and Kendall but her meddling ends up making matters worse. Kim turns to her friend Winnie Harlow for support while searching for a cure for her worsening Psoriasis. Kris makes herself at home in Kylie's new office space, so Kylie must show her mom who's boss.
241	11	"Treachery"	June 23, 2019	1.32
Khloe deals with some debilitating health issues, but her world is turned upside down when rumors surface that Tristan Thompson cheated with Kylie's best friend Jordyn Woods; Kanye brings his family and friends together to celebrate the healing power of music.
242	12	"Aftershock"	June 30, 2019	1.40
In the aftermath of Tristan's shocking betrayal, Kim, Kourtney and Malika take Khloe on a getaway to help her cope with the news. Khloe's anger reaches a boiling point when she learns that Jordyn is speaking publicly about what happened, causing her to lash out. Kylie has a decision to make about the future of her relationship with her best friend.
