= The Spin Crowd =

- Genre: Reality
- Directed by: Katherine Brooks
- Starring: Jonathan Cheban; Simon Huck; Lauren Stoner; Katie Mox; Erika Ledesma; Summer Hill
- Country of origin: United States
- Original language: English
- No. of seasons: 1
- No. of episodes: 8

Production
- Executive producers: Gil Goldschein; Jeff Jenkins; Jonathan Murray; Kim Kardashian; Russell Jay
- Running time: 22 to 24 minutes
- Production company: Bunim/Murray Productions

Original release
- Network: E!
- Release: August 22 – October 10, 2010

Related
- Keeping Up with the Kardashians

The Spin Crowd is an American reality television series detailing the lives of six employees who work for Command PR, a Hollywood public relations firm. Created as a spin-off from the E! channel's series of programs centred around the Kardashian family, the series premiered on August 22, 2010, and ran for one season, its final episode airing on October 10, 2010. The series received generally poor reviews from critics.

== Production ==
The series acted as spin-off and expansion of several "Kardashian" themed programs on the E! channel. It was reportedly conceptualized by Kim Kardashian, who became one of the program's executive producers. The Spin Crowd was Kardashian's first experience in a producing role, and she was compensated with a $180,000 fee for her involvement. The show's stars, Jonathan Cheban and Simon Huck, were acquaintances with Kardashian in addition to being her public relations representatives, with Cheban having a notable and publicly known close personal relationship with her. Huck and Cheban had previously made frequent appearances on Keeping Up with the Kardashians, with their popularity among fans of the series reportedly leading to the creation of The Spin Crowd. Kim Kardashian stated, "I got such a good response from everyone writing in, saying, 'oh my god, Jonathan and Simon are so funny, you have to put them on the show more, why aren't they on more?' And so what better way than just to give them their own show?" Cheban described himself and the rest of the cast as being "exhausted" during the filming of the series, but did state that it was enjoyable to make. Kardashian expressed satisfaction with her producing role, and a desire to continue working behind the scenes after the completion of the show.

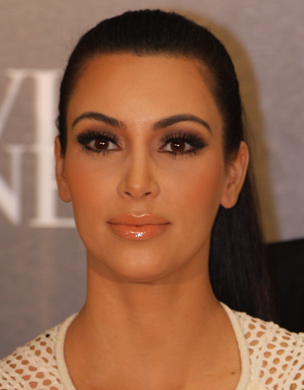
Kardashian in 2011.

The Spin Crowd began as half-hour special, entitled "The SPINdustry", which aired on E! on February 21, 2010 following the season 4 finale of Keeping Up with the Kardashians. Described as a "half-hour documentary", "The SPINdustry" focused on the launch of specialty candy line. While critically panned, "The SPINdustry" special received high audience ratings, with 2.53 million viewers at its debut. A full eight-episode series based around the special's premise was approved shortly after. The full series was announced to the public by E! on June 10, 2010.

In addition to Kardashian, Gil Goldschein and Jeff Jenkins acted as executive producers, as well as reality television producer Jonathan Murray. Episodes were directed by Katherine Brooks. Music for the show was composed by Michael Stone. Bunim Murray Productions, the company behind Keeping Up with the Kardashians and other Kardashian related programs, was the production company.

The series's name, The Spin Crowd, and the title of the pilot episode, "The SPINdustry" allude to the term "spin" as used in the PR industry. The show drew influence from popular reality programs such as The Hills in development, and was intended to, as stated by Cheban, give audiences a look into how the public relations works to promote the products of celebrities. It aired at 10:30 PM on E! with new episodes premiering weekly, each episode averaging a length of roughly 22 minutes in a half-hour time slot. The series was aimed to appeal to viewers between ages eighteen to thirty-four.

== Premise ==
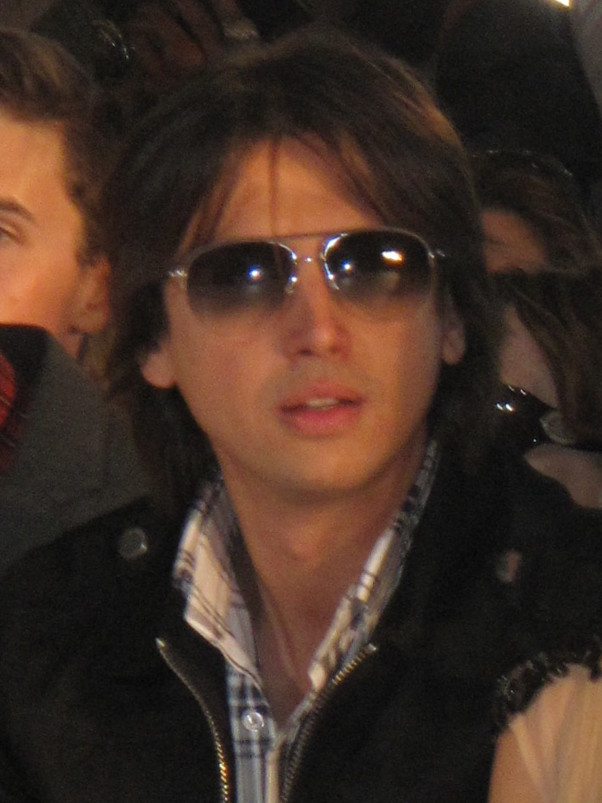
Cheban in 2010.

The series followed the employees of Cheban's public relations firm, Command PR (currently Command Entertainment Group); in addition to Cheban and Huck, Lauren Stoner, Katie Mox, Erika Ledesma, and Summer Hill feature prominently as the firm's employees. While the firm was based in Miami, the series was shot at the Los Angeles branch of the company. Focuses in episodes included helping celebrities promote products (such as Mario Lopez, Sophie Monk, and Carmen Electra) and the daily lives and personal drama between the firm's employees. Cheban and Huck's dynamic was a prominent focus, with their personalities clashing and creating many of the show's dramatic moments. Episodes typically featured at least one major party or celebratory event (such as a product launch or promotion) where the employees interact with various attending celebrities. Each individual episode featured at least one celebrity appearance. The series featured largely unscripted dialogue between the participants.

== Episodes ==
No.	Title	Original release date
0	"The SPINdustry"	February 21, 2010
A half-hour special that eventually led to the creation of the full series. The episode featured cameo appearances from Mel B and Kim Kardashian and featured Jonathan and Simon's attempts to help the former in self-promotion.
1	"Image Is Everything"	August 22, 2010
The firm helps Mario Lopez promote a line of men's tanning products; Jonathan pressures employee Erika Ledesma to get collagen lip fillings, which she eventually does.
2	"Gave and Take"	August 29, 2010
An office prank gone awry causes Summer to have a panic attack; Jonathan and Simon's differences lead to clashing in their personal lives; the firm helps Kelly Osbourne promote a charity.
3	"Beauty and the Billionaire"	September 6, 2010
Simon helps a billionaire in turning his girlfriend into a star; Jonathan struggles to cooperate with a pair of twin publicists.
4	"Should I Stay or Should I Go?"	September 12, 2010
Tensions between Jonathan and Simon lead to the latter moving out of their shared home. Shannen Doherty cameos at a ribbon cutting ceremony.
5	"PR and the City"	September 19, 2010
Jonathan helps Kim Kardashian throw an event to promote the Dian Fossey Gorilla Fund; he enlists the firm's staff to throw his own party.
6	"Summer Lovin'"	September 26, 2010
The employees visit the Hamptons for vacation; Kelly Rowland joins them, and a series of pranks ensues.
7	"Hungry for Love"	October 3, 2010
Jonathan faces conflicts with his girlfriend; Summer and Lauren argue; the firm promotes with Carmen Electra to promote her new line of romance toys.
8	"The Final Straw"	October 10, 2010
Jonathan embarrasses Simon in front of Stephanie Pratt. Simon asks to be made a partner at the firm.

== Reception ==
=== Reviews ===
While performing highly in viewership ratings, The Spin Crowd received overall negative reviews from critics, Cheban's actions being a large source of the criticism. Lindsay Hurd stated that it "doesn't give a worthwhile look into the world of PR". Brian Lowry criticized Cheban's behaviour on the program, deeming him "a complete knucklehead and an HR nightmare." While admitting that Cheban and Huck's dynamic was "fun to watch", Barry Garron admonished the "hostile work environment" cultivated by Cheban, and accused the series of creating a "sanitized" image of the public relations industry "for the benefit of the celebrities who appear on it".

=== Criticism ===
The series has been accused of perpetrating stereotypes of women who work in the public relations industry, with an emphasis on the social lives of the characters over their work. When compared to the docu-series Kell On Earth, Cherese Colston wrote that "The Spin Crowd offered the most unrealistic depiction of women in the PR field and the PR field in general." The series glamorized the importance of physical appearance in the PR industry, especially those of women; Camille Renée Hashem observed that "it seems as though the staff are there to look good instead of actually work." Critics specifically highlighted and condemned a plot line in the first episode, "Image Is Everything", in which Cheban pressures employee Erika Ledesma to undergo a collagen lip injection procedure, an event described by Hurd as a "misogynistic act". The focus on the physical appearance of female employees leans into the stereotype of the sexualized female PR representative overall perpetrated by the program.

The series was further criticized for its stereotypical and misrepresentation of the public relations industry as a whole. Shannon E. Sullivan stated that The Spin Crowd presents a false image of those who work PR, portraying the lifestyle as being "all about appearance, sexuality, and partying". She further claims that the series devalues and undermines the reputations of those who work in the public relations industry, damaging the overall societal image of those who pursue it.

=== Comparisons to other shows ===
The series has been compared to the reality television show Kell on Earth, which began airing shortly before the premiere of "The SPINdustry" special. Both programs ran for one season of eight episodes, and follow the lives of the managers of public relations firms (Kelly Cutrone in Kell on Earth, Jonathon Cheban and Simon Huck in The Spin Crowd) and their employees. However, though centring around the PR firm, The Spin Crowd focuses its storylines and conflict on interpersonal drama and high society interactions, while Kell on Earth highlights the work routine of the public relations field. Additionally, The Spin Crowd was initially more commercially successful than Kell on Earth.
