= Brooke Burfitt =

English actress

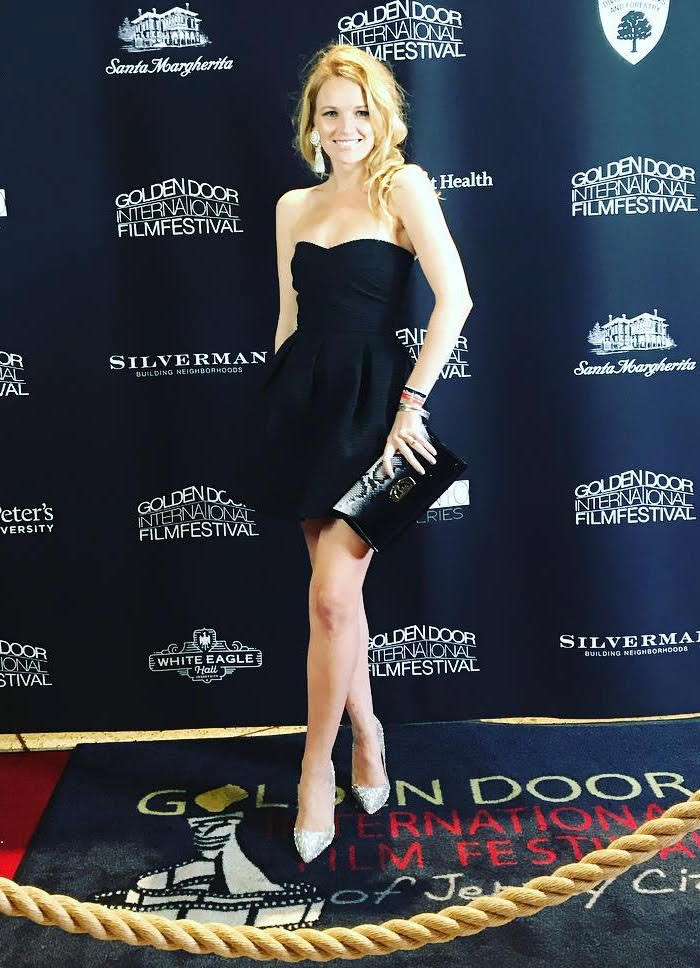
- Brooke Burfitt at the Bermuda International Film Festival 2017
- Born: Brooke India Burfitt; 23 December 1988 (age 37)
- Occupations: Actor, Producer
- Spouse: Rhys Williams (m. 2014)
- Children: 1
- Website: www.brooke-burfitt.com

Brooke Burfitt (born 23 December 1988) is an English actress, film producer and radio presenter.

== Early life ==
Burfitt was born in London on 23 December 1988. Her father is Donald Burfitt-Dons, born in New Zealand, a retired Qantas airline captain, and her mother is Louise Burfitt-Dons, born in Kuwait, a crime thriller author and the founder of the children’s charity Act Against Bullying. Burfitt has one sibling, Arabella Burfitt-Dons, who also works in the film industry.

Burfitt spent the first few years of her childhood in Sydney, Australia. She began her elementary education at l'écoles publiques de Magagnosc in the south of France. When she was seven, her family relocated to England and settled in Virginia Water, Surrey. The high school that she attended was Lady Eleanor Holles School, a private day school in Hampton, London.

In 2009, Burfitt was awarded a degree in Economics and Business with East European Studies from University College London.

== Career ==
Burfitt's first film was On the Ropes (2011), a mockumentary about boxing; she played the girlfriend of Big Joe, who was played by the real-life boxer Joe Egan. In Death she was directed by Martin Gooch which won at the Feel Good Film Festival in 2012. She has also featured in the comedy Pulp and the movie Soft Touch.

In 2014, Brooke worked with actor and film maker Stuart Brennan on a zombie apocalypse feature film 'Plan Z' as supporting lead role, Irish girl Kate. The film went on to win Best Thriller at the National Film Awards UK

Brooke Burfitt stars as the lead role in independent feature "By Any Means (2017 film)" as "Mimi Wyatt". Radar Online says the film's storyline channels Kim Kardashian's paris robbery in 2016. Burfitt won Best Actress award at the Wexford Film Festival, where the film also went on to win Best Film. By Any Means (2017 film) won Best International Feature Film at the 2017 Polish International Film Festival.

"By Any Means (2017 film)" was the subject of some controversy after convicted kidnapper Lukasz Herba stated in the closing statement of his trial that he was inspired after watching the movie. Herba, a UK resident from Poland, was sentenced to almost 17 years in jail for his role in the abduction of Chloe Ayling in Milan in July 2017, eight weeks after the release of the film.

Brooke stars alongside Kelly McGillis and Kate Mansi in female-led thriller "Mother Of All Secrets", which was entirely filmed in Bermuda. The movie premiered on Lifetime (TV network) over Mother's Day weekend in March 2020.

Burfitt plays the lead Blair Henderson in festive romantic comedy Television film "Christmas at the Castle", which premiered on 23 December on Lifetime (TV network). She stars alongside Dan Jeannotte, Nicholas Farrell, Geraldine Somerville and Caprice Bourret. The film is also released worldwide by Reel One Entertainment under the alternative title of "Christmas in the Highlands".

On 8 January 2022, "Labor, Lies and Murder" aired as an exclusive premiere for Lifetime (TV network). Brooke plays eight month pregnant Hailey, who fears someone is out to steal her baby. Burfitt could be seen over the 2022 Christmas holidays on Great American Family premiere movie "Christmas Lovers Anonymous" as Katrina, a best-selling author who hides her love for Christmas after an ugly break up. Katrina finds love again when she joins a website for people who are crazy about Christmas: "Christmas Lovers Anonymous."

In February 2024, Up TV premiered "The Soulmate Search", starring Alexandra Harris and Jonathan Stoddard. Brooke plays the role of Diane, Will's sister in the film. Super Channel and Amazon Prime released "Finding Love In Saint Lucia" across North America in the summer of 2024. Burfitt plays a journalist who partners up with an ornithologist, played by Philip Boyd, to save an endangered bird species in the jungle of Saint Lucia. They immediately fall in love with the nature, and in the process, they'll also fall in love with each other.

== Personal life ==
Burfitt currently lives in Bermuda with her husband and daughter.

== Filmography ==
Year	Title	Role	Notes
2011	On the Ropes	Sarah	Cornerstone Media International
2012	After Death	Sally Sneed	TomCat Films
2013	Pulp	Noreen	Xbox Live
2014	The Catch	Clare	MWS Films
2016	Plan Z	Kate	Carnaby International
2017	By Any Means	Mimi Wyatt	Gravitas Ventures
2018	Mother Of All Secrets	Samantha	Lifetime
2020	Christmas at the Castle	Blair Henderson	Lifetime
2022	Love, Game, Match	Gina	Up TV
2022	Most Wonderful Time	Ella	Pure Flix
2022	Labor, Lies and Murder	Hailey Kendricks	Lifetime
2022	Christmas Lovers Anonymous	Katrina	Great American Family
2023	Love, Game, Match	Gina	Up TV
2023	The PA and the Manhattan Prince	Caroline	Amazon_Freevee
2024	The Soulmate Search	Diane	Up TV
2024	In Her Likeness	Marissa	Tubi
2024	Finding Love In Saint Lucia	Kennedy Webber	Amazon_Freevee
2026	Murder at Highland Manor	Kate	Triventure Films Limited
