= By Any Means (2016 film) =

- Theatrical release poster
- Directed by: Leighton Spence
- Written by: Clark Phillips-Janssen
- Produced by: Brooke Williams; Rhys Williams; Agam Jain; Dan Brouard
- Starring: Brooke Burfitt; Thomas Gipson; Michelle Money; Jonathan Cheban; Larese King
- Distributed by: Gravitas Ventures
- Release dates: November 27, 2016 (Wexford); June 27, 2017
- Running time: 84 minutes
- Country: United States
- Language: English

By Any Means is an American thriller directed by Leighton Spence and starring Brooke Burfitt, Thomas Gipson, Jonathan Cheban, and Michelle Money. The film had its first screening in Ireland before a run of international film festivals around the world in 2016. Gravitas Ventures acquired the distribution rights of the film, which was released by video on demand and on DVD on June 27, 2017.

== Plot ==
The plot centres around a fictional abduction for ransom of a reality TV star.

== Awards ==
By Any Means was officially selected for a number of film festivals around the world, including Ramsgate Film Festival and was official selected for the Bermuda International Film Festival. The film won at the 2016 Wexford Film Festival where it took home the Best Film award and Brooke Burfitt for Best Actress. The film won Best International Feature Film at the Polish International Film Festival 2017.

== In popular culture ==
The film received media attention after convicted kidnapper Lukasz Herba stated in the closing statement of his trial that he was inspired after watching the movie. Herba, a UK resident from Poland, was sentenced to almost 17 years in jail for his role in the abduction of Chloe Ayling in Milan in July 2017.
