= Adam Hamdy =

British novelist, screenwriter and film producer

- Born: 12 March 1974 (age 52); London, United Kingdom
- Occupations: Author, screenwriter, film producer
- Writing career
- Period: 2004–present
- Notable works: Pendulum, Black 13, Private Moscow
- Website: www.adamhamdy.com

Adam Hamdy (born 12 March 1974) is a Sunday Times best-selling British novelist, screenwriter and film producer best known for his novels, Pendulum, Black 13, and Private Moscow, co-written with James Patterson.

== Biography ==
Hamdy was born and raised in London, United Kingdom. He attended the University of Oxford, and graduated with a degree in law. He also holds a degree in philosophy from the University of London. Hamdy joined the consulting team at Lloyd's of London. From there, he went on to join a niche management consulting firm and worked in the technology and medical sectors.

Using seed finance provided by the partners in his consulting firm, Hamdy founded a company that developed specialist online payment systems. He raised £7.5m in venture capital to launch the business. The business was later sold to one of the venture capital investors.

Hamdy left the corporate world to work as a writer. His novel, Pendulum, was published internationally by Headline in November 2016. In January 2017 it featured on BBC Radio 2's Book Club. Freefall and Aftershock completed the Pendulum trilogy.

Hamdy signed a three book deal with Pan Macmillan for a new series of contemporary espionage books set against a backdrop of rising political extremism. Black 13, the first book in the series was published in January 2020. The second book, Red Wolves, was published in July 2021.

Hamdy co-wrote Private Moscow with James Patterson, and the book became a Sunday Times bestseller upon publication in September 2020. The follow-up, Private Rogue, became a Sunday Times bestseller upon publication in July 2021.

His novel The Other Side of Night was published in September 2022 by Pan Macmillan in the UK and Atria Publishing Group in the United States.

Hamdy produced the feature film, Pulp, which became the first film to ever premiere on the Xbox Video platform.

In February 2020, Hamdy became a vocal critic of the UK Government's response to the COVID-19 pandemic and has written extensively on the subject. Further to this, Hamdy was one of the authors of the John Snow Memorandum, which points out that from evidence-based considerations a "pandemic management strategy relying upon immunity from natural infections for COVID-19 is flawed".

== Works ==
- Battalion (2010)
- Out of Reach (Endeavour Press, 2014)
- Pendulum (Headline, 2016)
- Freefall (Headline, 2017)
- Aftershock (Headline, 2018)
- Black 13 (Pan Macmillan, 2020)
- Private Moscow (Cornerstone & Arrow, 2020)
- Private Rogue (Cornerstone & Arrow, 2021)
- Red Wolves (Pan Macmillan, 2021)
- The Other Side of Night (Pan Macmillan, Atria Publishing Group 2022)

== Filmography ==
- Pulp (2012) Director, Producer
