= Pulp (2012 film) =

- Directed by: Adam Hamdy; Shaun Magher
- Written by: Bode O'Toole
- Produced by: Phil Bland; Phil Chalk; Adam Hamdy
- Starring: Jay Sutherland; Gavin Molloy; Simon Burbage; Lucy Cudden; John Thomson
- Cinematography: Yuri Krylov
- Edited by: Matt Gray
- Production companies: Dare Productions; Reels in Motion
- Release date: March 2013
- Country: United Kingdom
- Language: English
- Budget: £1.2 million

Pulp is a British comedy film directed by Adam Hamdy and Shaun Magher, starring Jay Sutherland and John Thomson, In March 2013, it was released exclusively on Xbox Live, becoming the first feature film to be distributed via a games console platform.

== Plot ==
Pulp tells the story of Tony Leary, the nice-guy owner of Junk Comics, who is gearing up for one last roll of the dice. He plans to launch his new superhero title, The Sodomizer, at the British International Comic Show, and nothing will stop Tony from making it a success. Nothing except a gang of Geordie criminals who are using another comic company to launder their dirty money. Tony is drafted by the police to identify the culprits and bring them to justice. Aided by his trusty geek sidekicks, Rick and Keith, Tony must defy the odds if he is to become a real life hero.

== Cast ==
- Jay Sutherland as Tony
- Gavin Molloy as Rick
- Simon Burbage as Keith
- Lucy Cudden as Sam
- John Thomson as Dave Burns
- Sarah Alexandra Marks as Laura
- Neil Jennings as Tyler
- Lee Ravitz as Clem
- Bhasker Patel as Stan
- Amelia Tyler as Ashley
- Brooke Burfitt as Noreen

== Development ==
Pulp was written by Bode O'Toole, based on a series of troubling events Adam Hamdy endured during his ten years of experience developing comics, notably one particularly eventful trip to San Diego Comic-Con in 2010.

Hamdy's Dare Productions entered into a partnership with Midlands-based production company Reels in Motion in order to develop Pulp in late 2010. Filming took place in Birmingham, Stoke-on-Trent and Altrincham with principal photography wrapping in early 2011.

In April 2011, the producers of Pulp announced a deal with Aol to distribute online videos based on the Pulp brand.

In January 2013, the producers of Pulp announced a deal with Microsoft to distribute Pulp on the Xbox, making Pulp the first feature film to ever premiere on the platform.

The film was released exclusively on Xbox Live on 4 March 2013.

Pulp marks a departure for a movie release by bypassing the usual route to viewers via traditional distribution models involving theaters or DVDs. The success of such a model could see more films being released in such a format.
