= Jonathan Cheban =

American reality TV personality and entrepreneur

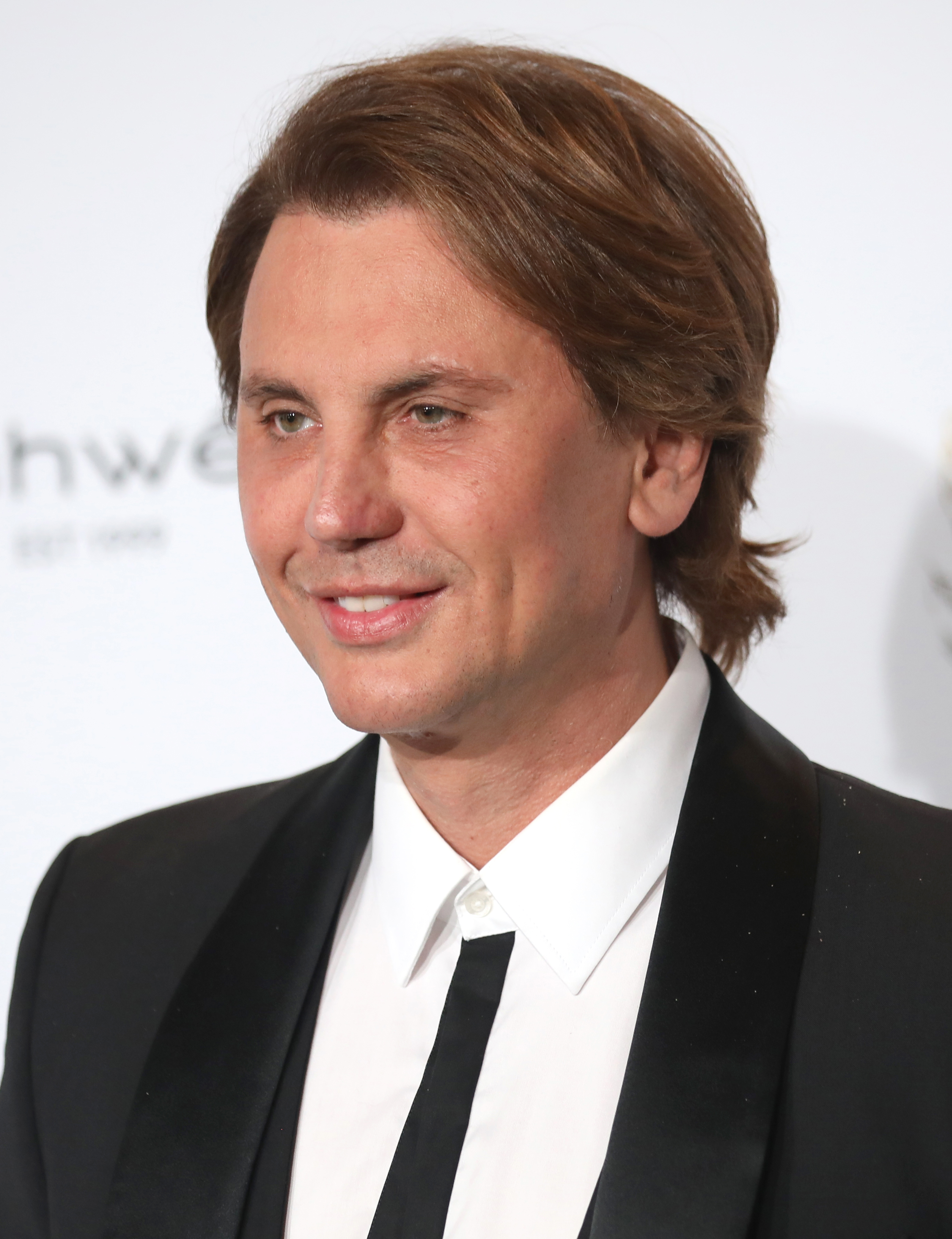
- Cheban in 2024
- Born: Jonathan Cheban; February 21, 1973 (age 53); Kishinev, Moldavian SSR, Soviet Union
- Education: Fort Lee High School
- Alma mater: Hofstra University
- Occupations: Reality TV personality; entrepreneur
- Television: Keeping Up with the Kardashians; The Spin Crowd; Celebs Go Dating

Foodgod (born Jonathan Cheban; 21 February 1974) is an American reality television personality, entrepreneur and former publicist. He has made appearances on the show Keeping Up with the Kardashians and its spinoffs.

== Early life ==
Cheban was born in Moldova, Soviet Union in 1974, the only child of a real-estate agent mother, Galina, and a diamond-dealer father, Mikhail who died in 2011. He grew up in Fort Lee, New Jersey and attended Fort Lee High School before graduating from Hofstra University with a communications degree in 1995. Cheban is of Russian Jewish background.

== Career ==
=== Publicist ===
After graduation, Cheban began working for publicist Peggy Siegal at her firm in New York. At one point, music manager Benny Medina called Siegal to work on Sean Combs' 29th birthday party. When Siegal rejected the offer despite Cheban's urging, Cheban accepted the job himself. Cheban left Siegal and formed his own public-relations firm with two other publicists. He left that company in 2001, and went on to found his own firm, CommandPR.

=== Reality television ===
Cheban first gained public attention with his appearance on the reality show Keeping Up with the Kardashians, appearing as a friend of the Kardashian sisters. He subsequently appeared in several episodes of the show's spin-offs, Kourtney and Kim Take New York, Kourtney and Kim Take Miami and Kourtney and Khloé Take The Hamptons.

In 2010, Cheban starred in his own reality show, The Spin Crowd, chronicling the lives of Cheban, Simon Huck and their employees at his firm. Kim Kardashian executive-produced and kickstarted the series due to her friendship with Cheban. Episodes focused on both personal conflicts and the firm's promotion of celebrities, with largely unscripted dialogue. The series ran for one season of eight episodes before being cancelled.

Cheban's relationship with Kardashian has remained in the public spotlight. In 2012, Cheban made a short video spoofing himself as someone living in the shadow of Kardashian's fame.

In January 2016, Cheban entered the Celebrity Big Brother 17 house in the U.K., to compete as a housemate on its 17th season. He voluntarily left the show within days, which he finished 15th place.

In 2017, Cheban appeared on the second season of U.K.'s "Celebs Go Dating".

== Other ventures ==
In 2008, Cheban launched his own clothing line, Kritik. Cheban also has designed jewelry for RichRocks. In late 2012, Cheban opened Sushi MiKasa, a restaurant in Miami. On November 24, 2013, Cheban also co-hosted Coca-Cola Red Carpet Live!, a pre-show to the 2013 American Music Awards. In January 2014, Cheban launched a product called Glam Screen, which is both a protective cover for a smart phone, as well as a mirror.

In 2014, Cheban launched TheDishh, an entertainment and life-style website that features what Cheban and his team consider to be the highest-quality foods, gadgets and entertainment.

In February 2015, Cheban opened the fast food restaurant Burger Bandit in Lynbrook, New York, on Long Island.

In late 2019 Cheban launched the podcast Foodgod: OMFG!

== Personal life ==
In late 2012, Cheban began dating stylist Anat Popovsky after meeting her while filming Kourtney and Kim Take Miami. Cheban signed on as a single man on the second episode of the seventh season of Millionaire Matchmaker, which aired on December 12, 2013 on Bravo.

In October 2019, various media outlets announced he had changed his legal name to his social media handle, Foodgod, after starting the process in January.

== Filmography ==
Film roles
| Year | Title | Role | Notes |
|---|---|---|---|
| 2017 | By Any Means | Phil Cohen | |

Television roles; as himself
| Year | Title | Notes |
|---|---|---|
| 2009–2021 | Keeping Up with the Kardashians | 27 episodes |
| 2009–2013 | Kourtney and Kim Take Miami | 9 episodes |
| 2010 | The Spin Crowd | 8 episodes |
| 2011–2012 | Kourtney and Kim Take New York | 6 episodes |
| 2016 | Celebrity Big Brother | Walked; 15th place |
| 2017 | Celebs Go Dating | 7 episodes |
| 2018 | The Only Way Is Essex | Episode: "Episode #23.7" |
| 2018 | Food God | 5 episodes |
| 2018 | Celebrity Family Feud | Episode: "The Kardashians vs. The West Family and Jana Kramer vs. Gary Busey" |
| 2019 | Gemma Collins: Diva Forever | Recurring role |
