= Maternal Secrets =

- Theatrical release poster
- Screenplay by: Louise Burfitt-Dons Lucinda Spurlin
- Directed by: Lucinda Spurling
- Starring: Kate Mansi; Kelly McGillis; Brooke Burfitt; Sean Stolzen; LuAnn de Lesseps
- Countries of origin: United States; Bermuda
- Original language: English

Original release
- Network: Lifetime
- Release: 8 March 2018

Maternal Secrets is a 2018 American-Bermudan strong woman thriller television film, set in Bermuda. It is directed by Lucinda Spurling and stars Kate Mansi. Kelly McGillis, Brooke Burfitt, Sean Stolzen and Luann de Lesseps. The film was filmed under the working title "Babymoon", but the film trailer was released in June under a new title "Mother of All Secrets". It got its Lifetime debut on May 9, 2020.

== Synopsis ==
When a state senator goes missing on vacation in Bermuda, his pregnant girlfriend Aubrey searches for answers. What she learns is his estranged mother is on the island and knows more about the disappearance than she is letting on.

== Production ==
The film was shot in January/February 2017 on the island of Bermuda. It is the first film to be shot on the island in over twenty-five years. The film was co-written and directed by Lucinda Spurling and Louise Burfitt-Dons and produced by Brooke Williams. Kate Mansi told Soap Opera Digest she was most proud that it "was the largest female cast & crew I have ever worked with so far."
