= Kate Mansi =

American actress

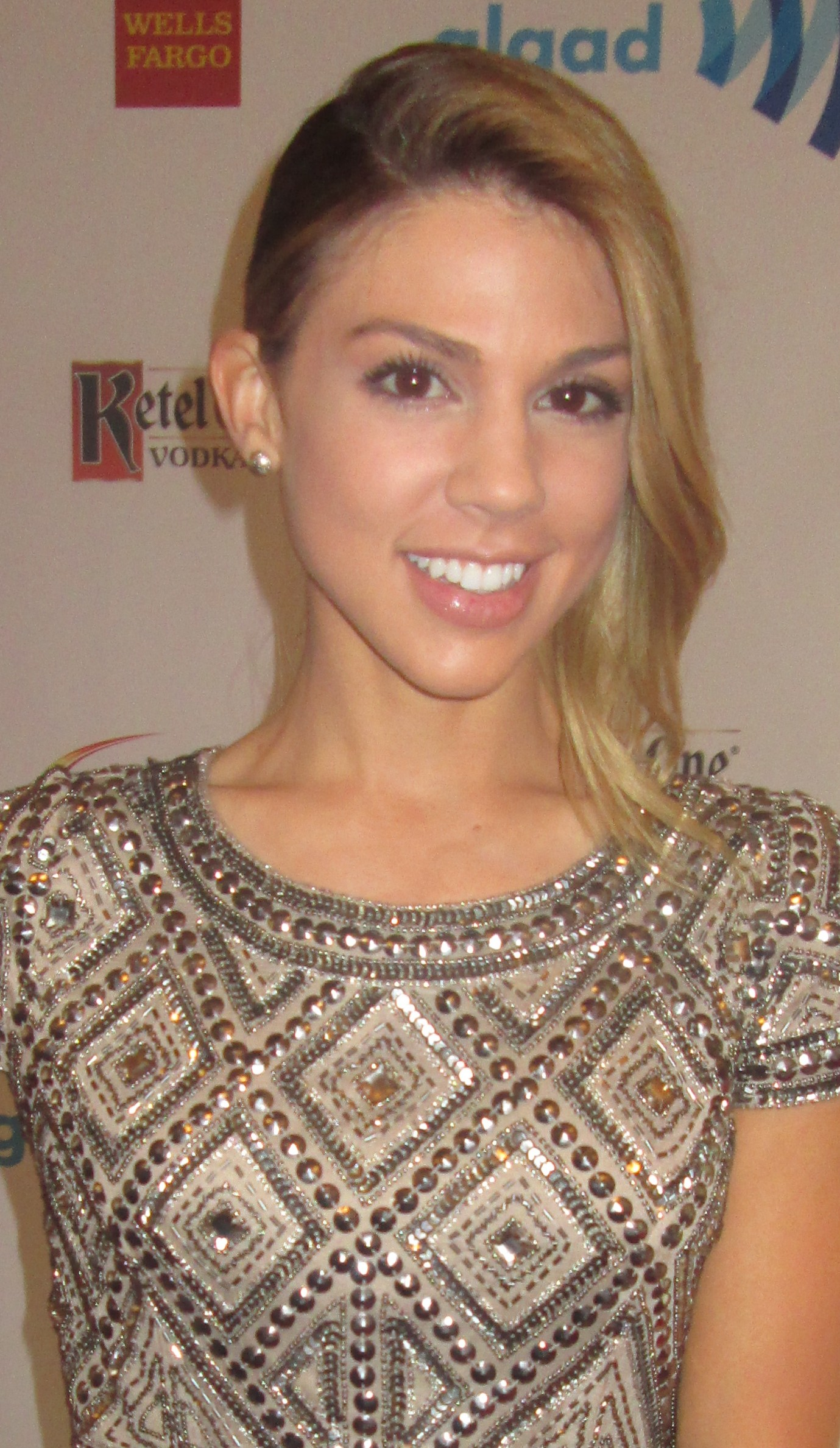
- Mansi at the 2014 GLAAD Media Awards
- Occupation: Actress
- Years active: 2008–present
- Spouse: Matt McInnis (m. 2025)
- Website: Official website

Kate Mansi is an American actress. She is best known for playing the role of Abigail Deveraux on the NBC series Days of Our Lives from 2011 to 2016, for which in 2017, she won the Daytime Emmy Award for Outstanding Supporting Actress in a Drama Series. She returned to the role in 2018, last appearing in May 2020. In 2023, she joined the ABC daytime series General Hospital in the role of Kristina Davis.

== Early life ==
Kate Mansi is of English, Irish and Italian descent, and she studied film and public relations at Pepperdine University, where she graduated with a Bachelor of Arts degree.

== Career ==
Until the end of 2016, Mansi played Abby on Days of Our Lives. Mansi returned to Days of Our Lives in November 2018 for a short-term period of time and then again in 2019 at which point she resumed the role of Abigail up until 2020. In 2019, it was announced that a spin-off of Days of Our Lives called Days of Our Lives: Chad & Abby in Paris would begin production.

In 2013, Mansi launched a campaign to raise $20,000 for Charity: Water, "giving up" her birthday to raise awareness for the cause of clean water. She announced through her Twitter account on December 30 that she succeeded in raising the full amount.

In May 2023, it was announced Mansi had joined the cast of General Hospital in the role of Kristina Davis. In 2025, she directed for the first time an episode of General Hospital and a second episode in 2026. In May 2026, Mansi announced that she would be leaving General Hospital.

In September 2026, Mansi was cast in the Tony Award and Pulitzer Prize-winning play Proof as Catherine at the Arizona Theatre from September 27 through October 17.

== Personal life ==
On May 31, 2025, Mansi married producer Matt McInnis.

== Filmography ==
=== Acting ===
Television
Year	Title	Role	Notes
2008	How I Met Your Mother	Amanda	Episode: "The Fight"
2011–16, 2018–20	Days of Our Lives	Abigail Deveraux	Series regular (2011–2016); Recurring role (2018–2020)
2011	38th Daytime Emmy Awards	Self	Television special directed by Chris Donovan
2012	39th Daytime Emmy Awards	Self	Television special directed by Mark Lucas
2013	40th Daytime Emmy Awards	Self	Television special directed by Mark Lucas
2014	41st Daytime Emmy Awards	Self	Television special directed by Jim Piccirillo
2014	83rd Annual Hollywood Christmas Parade	Self	Television special directed by Chris Merrill
2016	Unwanted Guest	Amy Thomas	Made-for-TV movie directed by Fred Olen Ray
2017	Boyfriend Killer	Krystal Kellers	Made-for-TV movie directed by Alyn Darnay
2017	Small Shots	Marissa	Episode: "Porzingis"
2017	The Talk	Self	Episode: "Daytime Emmy After-Party"
2017	Celebrity Page	Self	2 episodes
2018	Maternal Secrets	Aubrey	Made-for-TV movie directed by Lucinda Spurling
2019	Days of Our Lives: Chad & Abby in Paris	Abigail Deveraux	Mini series
2020	The Office Mix-Up	Lacey	Made-for-TV movie directed by Andrew Lawrence
2020	Paltrocast with Darren Paltrowitz	Self	Episode: "Cast & Crew Of "Casa Grande" + Jonas Chernick + Sean Garrity + Love And Rockets' Kevin Haskins"
2023	Casa Grande	Hunter Clarkman	Series regular
2023–26	General Hospital	Kristina Davis	Series regular

Film
Year	Title	Role	Director(s)	Notes
2018	Muse	Maria	John Burr	Romantic drama film
2018	The Perfect One	Maria	Nick Everhart	Thriller film
2018	Nightclub Secrets	Zoe	Joe Menendez	Thriller film
2020	Legend of the Muse	Maria	John Burr	Thriller film
2026	Casa Grande	Hunter Clarkman	Juan Pablo Arias Munoz	Drama film

=== Directing ===
Year	Title	Notes
2025–26	General Hospital	2 episodes

== Awards and nominations ==
Year	Award	Category	Work	Result	Ref.
2017	Daytime Emmy Award	Outstanding Supporting Actress in a Drama Series	Days of Our Lives	Won	
2019	Daytime Emmy Award	Outstanding Guest Performer in a Drama Series	Days of Our Lives	Nominated	
2025	Daytime Emmy Award	Outstanding Supporting Actress in a Drama Series	General Hospital	Nominated	
