= Black Jaguar-White Tiger Foundation =

Mexican unlicensed wildlife facility

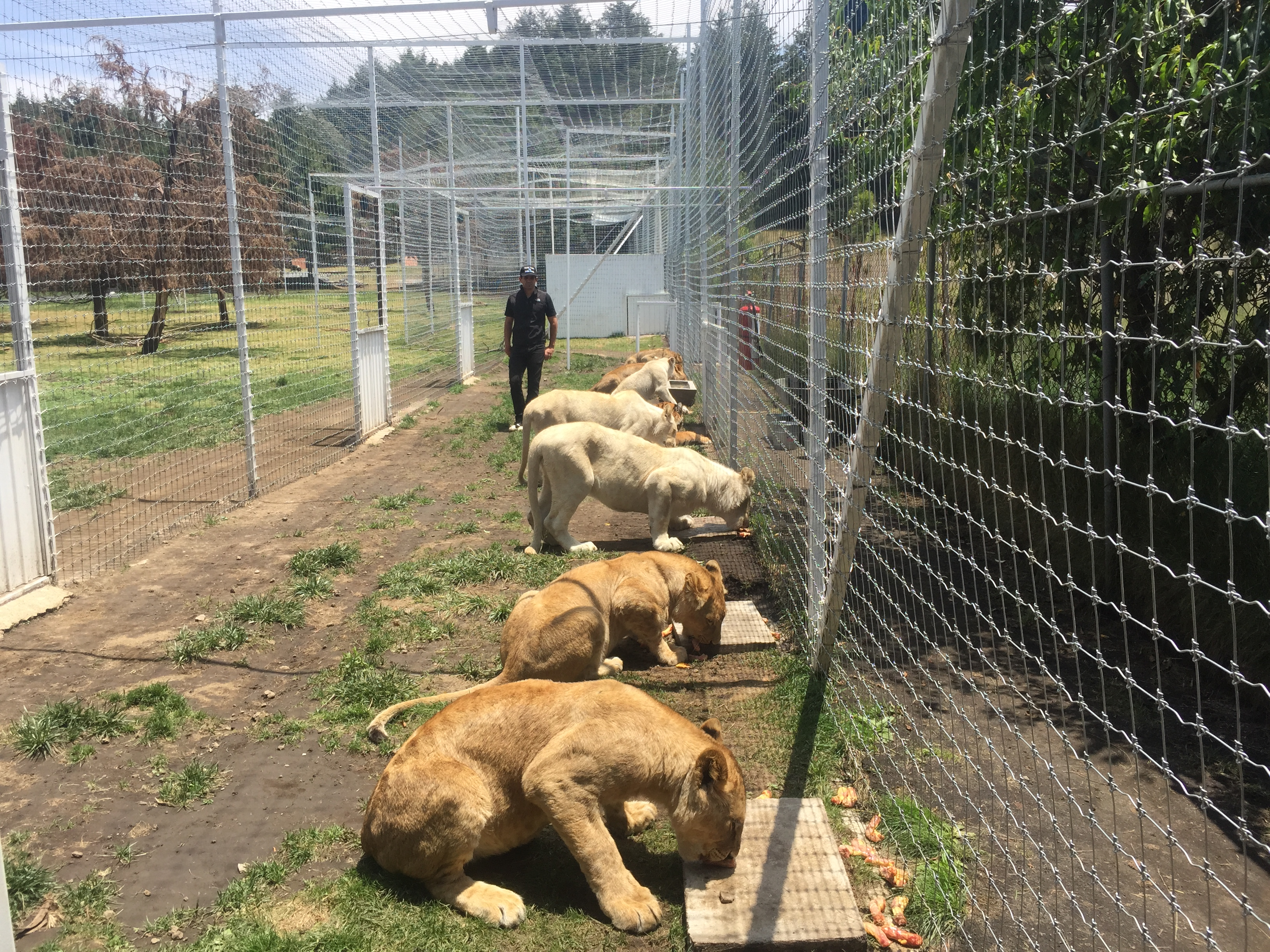
Lions feeding at the facility

The Black Jaguar-White Tiger Foundation (BJWT) was an unregistered and unlicensed non-profit 501(c)(3) wildlife facility located in Mexico that hosted big cats as well as dogs and other animals. BJWT was shut down by Mexican authorities on July 5, 2022, due to a viral video showing the cats eating themselves alive.

== History ==
In 2013, BJWT was founded in Monterrey, Mexico, by businessman Eduardo Serio. The organization's big cats come from circuses, breeders, and zoos. Numerous celebrities visited the facility, including Lewis Hamilton, Khloe Kardashian and Kendall Jenner in a 2015 episode of Keeping Up with the Kardashians, Paris Hilton, and the Backstreet Boys. Concerns over unsafe contact between humans and big cats garnered criticism from animal rights advocates. Both PETA and Wild Welfare criticized BJWT for exploiting and mistreating the wild cats, keeping them in small enclosures and promoting wild cats as pets. PETA also raised concerns about the large amount of cubs, who were likely torn away from their mothers and do not have their basic needs met. They also claimed that when the animals get older, they were typically cast aside.

The foundation was never accredited by the Global Federation of Animal Sanctuaries. In July 2022, footage was released of animals, particularly the big cats in "deplorable" conditions, struggling to stand, emaciated and gnawing off their own tails. The Association of Zoos, Breeders and Aquariums of Mexico AC (AZCARM) also filed a complaint with the Attorney General as well as a lawsuit against Serio, claiming that the facility was no longer licensed or registered after the animals were moved from the original approved habitat to a smaller, unsuitable space. Former employees and activists have filed complaints, alleging that the animals are put down if they are too big for their enclosure and often die due to exposure to the elements, lack of food and water and lack of access to veterinary services.

== Shutdown ==
The facility was shut down on July 4, 2022, after being raided by Mexican officials. 177 felines, 17 monkeys, 4 canines, 2 donkeys, and 2 coyotes were removed and placed with various Mexican zoos. According to prosecutors, Serio is wanted for "extreme abandonment and mistreatment of hundreds of large felines". Mexico's Attorney General alleges that the animals "devoured themselves to avoid starvation". Documentary filmmaker Arturo Allende, who has been working on a documentary about Black Jaguar-White Tiger Foundation, stated that it was "a holocaust for the animals".
