= Kardashian curse =

Belief that dating a Kardashian causes a person's career to fail

The Kardashian curse is a popular culture belief and media trope that claims individuals experience declines in career or personal life after romantic relationships with members of the Kardashian–Jenner family. The idea has circulated in tabloids, entertainment media, sports commentary, and social media, but has no scientific or empirical basis and is generally considered a coincidence or stereotype rather than a factual phenomenon.

== Overview ==
The term is used to describe perceived patterns of performance decline, injuries, reputational damage, or personal struggles among celebrities—particularly NBA players—who have dated members of the Kardashian–Jenner family. Media coverage emphasizes anecdotal examples while critics argue the narrative reflects confirmation bias, sexism, and racial stereotyping rather than evidence. Sociological analysis points to the trope as a modern iteration of the "femme fatale" archetype, where women are blamed for the failures of men.

== Origins ==
The earliest references of the so-called Kardashian curse started to appear in the early 2010s in sports blogs and media after high-profile relationships involving Kim Kardashian and professional athletes, including basketball player Kris Humphries and football player Reggie Bush.

The phrase gained recognition as social media amplified speculative commentary linking relationship timelines with coinciding injuries, trades, or declines in athletic performance. By the mid-2010s, the term had become a pop culture belief in media.

== Association with professional sports ==
The Kardashian curse is most frequently associated with the National Basketball Association (NBA). Players such as Lamar Odom, Tristan Thompson, and Ben Simmons have been discussed in media coverage due to periods of injury, inconsistent performance, or personal struggles happening during or after relationships with Kardashian–Jenner family members.

Other athletes frequently mentioned in relation to the trope include:

- Rashad McCants said in a 2017 interview that his relationship with Khloé Kardashian contributed to his exit from the NBA.
- James Harden said that the "media attention" during his relationship with Khloé Kardashian was distracting, though his on court performance remained high during and after the relationship.

Sports analysts and commentators have rejected the idea as lacking evidence, noting that professional athletes frequently experience injuries or performance decline regardless of personal relationships.

== Media and pop culture ==
The concept has been covered in tabloids and celebrity news outlets. It has also been referenced in opinion journalism, podcasts, and social media discourse.

Music and cultural commentary outlets have addressed the belief as part of discussions about celebrity branding and modern fame. In 2026, Kendall Jenner appeared in a Super Bowl LX advert mocking the "Kardashian Curse" by joking about betting on her ex-boyfriends.

== Criticism and analysis ==
Critics suggest that the Kardashian curse reflects misogynistic narratives that blame women for men’s professional outcomes, as well as stereotypes when applied to Black male athletes. Critics have noted that the curse ignores the role of the men involved and the high-pressure nature of professional sports.

Analysts have pointed to confirmation bias, noting that successful or unaffected partners—such as Devin Booker, who reached the 2021 NBA Finals while dating Kendall Jenner—are often excluded from discussions, while unrelated declines are retrospectively attributed to relationships to support the curse.

Members of the Kardashian–Jenner family have dismissed the idea. During the Keeping Up with the Kardashians reunion in 2021, Kendall Jenner stated, "What I don't like about this narrative is that the blame is on us... the men need to take that responsibility."

== See also ==
- Celebrity culture
- Media bias
- Confirmation bias
- Sports-related curses
- Sports Illustrated cover jinx
