= Simon Huck =

Public relations executive and reality TV personality

Simon Huck (born November 5, 1983) is the principal owner of the public relations firm Commando Entertainment Group and a marketing executive who launched the sci-fi A. Human exhibition in 2018.

He is also known for his association with celebrities, specifically , Kourtney Kardashian and his appearance in her reality shows, as well as starring in his own reality series called The Spin Crowd, which covered Command PR and was executive produced by Kardashian.

== Early life and public relations career ==
Huck was born in Ottawa, Ontario, Canada. During his teenage years, he studied acting at Canterbury High School in their specialized arts program. He moved to New York City in 2005 to begin working for publicist Lizzie Grubman. One of Huck's first projects was Sean Combs' White Party in the Hamptons. Huck joined Command PR in 2006 and became partner in 2010, which was shown on an episode of The Spin Crowd. In 2012, Huck acquired the entirety of the business.

In 2017, Command PR was relaunched as Command Entertainment Group.

== Reality television ==
Huck and then-business partner Cheban have appeared on reality television shows, Keeping Up with the Kardashians, Kourtney and Khloe Take Miami, and Kourtney and Kim Take New York as friends of the Kardashian family, and specifically Kim Kardashian.

In 2010, Huck and Cheban starred in their own reality series, The Spin Crowd, which was produced by Kim Kardashian and aired on E!. The series focused on the personal lives of Huck, Cheban, and the employees of Command PR, in addition to the firm's promotions of and interactions with celebrities. The series aired for one season of eight episodes before its cancellation.

Huck continues to be a 'supporting cast member' on KUWTK.

== A. Human ==
In September 2018, Huck launched a live storytelling brand called Society of Spectacle. SOS's first exhibition, A. Human, a theatrical experience showcasing body modifications from the future launched on September 4, 2018. Huck told Vogue, "We wanted to use the future of fashion and the future of self-expression as a way to look at the future. That is how the ethos of A. Human formed."

As part of the PR campaign for the installation, Huck enlisted Kim Kardashian, Andreja Pejic, Chrissy Teigen, and Tan France, to sport some of the far-out fashions in the A. Human line on social media.

The A. Human exhibition included The Pinnacle, an avant-garde design by former Lady Gaga creative director Nicola Formichetti, and work by makeup artist Isamaya Ffrench.

== Personal life ==
Huck has been married to Phil Riportella since November 2021. He graduated from Queen's University in 2006.
