= Hap and Leonard (TV series) =

- Season 2 poster
- Genre: Crime drama Mystery; Dark comedy
- Based on: Hap and Leonard by Joe R. Lansdale
- Developed by: Jim Mickle; Nick Damici
- Starring: James Purefoy; Michael K. Williams; Jimmi Simpson; Bill Sage; Christina Hendricks; Pollyanna McIntosh; Enrique Murciano; Tiffany Mack; Cranston Johnson; Brian Dennehy; Andrew Dice Clay
- Composer: Jeff Grace
- Country of origin: United States
- Original language: English
- No. of seasons: 3
- No. of episodes: 18

Production
- Executive producers: Nick Damici; Joe R. Lansdale; Jim Mickle; Linda Moran; Lowell Northrop; John Wirth
- Production location: Baton Rouge, Louisiana
- Camera setup: Single-camera
- Running time: 42-44 minutes
- Production companies: Nightshade; Plattform; AMC Studios

Original release
- Network: SundanceTV
- Release: March 2, 2016 – April 11, 2018

Hap and Leonard is an American drama television series based on the characters Hap and Leonard, created by novelist Joe R. Lansdale and adapted from his series of novels of the same name. The series was written and developed by Nick Damici and Jim Mickle, who had previously adapted Lansdale's Cold in July and was directed by Mickle. The series premiered on the American cable network SundanceTV on March 2, 2016. The series received favorable reviews.

The series was renewed for a final six-episode third season which premiered on March 7, 2018. The third season was inspired by the third novel in the Hap and Leonard series, titled The Two-Bear Mambo.

On May 14, 2018, SundanceTV announced they had cancelled the series after three seasons.

== Cast and characters ==
=== Main ===
- James Purefoy as Hap Collins, a white working class laborer who spent time in federal prison as a young man for refusing to be drafted into the military and serve in the Vietnam War
- Michael Kenneth Williams as Leonard Pine, a gay black Vietnam vet with serious anger issues
- Jimmi Simpson as Soldier, a local drug dealer (season 1)
- Bill Sage as Howard (season 1)
- Christina Hendricks as Trudy Fawst, Hap's ex-wife (season 1)
- Pollyanna McIntosh as Angel (season 1)
- Enrique Murciano as Raoul Vasquez (seasons 1–2)
- Tiffany Mack as Florida Grange (seasons 2–3)
- Cranston Johnson as Detective Marvin Hanson (seasons 2–3)
- Irma P. Hall as Meemaw (season 2)
- Brian Dennehy as Sheriff Valentine Otis (season 2)
- Andrew Dice Clay as Sonny Knox (season 3)

=== Recurring ===
- Neil Sandilands as Paco (season 1)
- Ron Roggé as Bud Collins
- Trace Masters as Little Hap
- Kaden Washington Lewis as Little Leonard
- Florence Young as Kay
- Kari Shemwell as Trudy Double
- Douglas M. Griffin as Charlie Blank
- Evan Gamble as Sneed
- Corbin Bernsen as Chief Cantuck
- Louis Gossett Jr. as Bacon (season 3)
- Laura Allen as Officer Reynolds
- John McConnell as Beau Otis
- Pat Healy as Truman Brown
- Jeff Pope as Chub

== Production ==
Filming of the show took place in Baton Rouge, Louisiana, although the series is set in 1980s in the fictional town of LaBorde in East Texas. Two of the locations used were the old Woman's Hospital and the Celtic Media Centre.

== Episodes ==
Season	Episodes	Originally released	
Season	Episodes	First released	Last released
1	6	March 2, 2016	April 6, 2016
2	6	March 15, 2017	April 19, 2017
3	6	March 7, 2018	April 11, 2018

=== Season 1 (2016) ===
The first season is inspired by Savage Season. The second episode "The Bottoms" was released online on March 2, 2016, a week before its scheduled airing.

No. overall	No. in season	Title	Directed by	Written by	Original release date	US viewers (millions)
1	1	"Savage Season"	Jim Mickle	Nick Damici & Jim Mickle	March 2, 2016	0.429
2	2	"The Bottoms"	Jim Mickle	Nick Damici & Jim Mickle	March 9, 2016	0.271
3	3	"The Dive"	Nick Gomez	E. L. Katz	March 16, 2016	0.197
4	4	"Trudy"	Nick Gomez	Nick Damici & Jim Mickle	March 23, 2016	0.208
5	5	"War"	Jim Mickle	Nick Damici	March 30, 2016	0.274
6	6	"Eskimos"	Jim Mickle	Jim Mickle	April 6, 2016	0.192

=== Season 2 (2017) ===
The second season is inspired by Mucho Mojo.

No. overall	No. in season	Title	Directed by	Written by	Original release date	US viewers (millions)
7	1	"Mucho Mojo"	Maurice Marable	Nick Damici and Jim Mickle	March 15, 2017	0.218
8	2	"Tickling Mojo"	Maurice Marable	Abe Sylvia	March 22, 2017	0.109
9	3	"Holy Mojo"	Abe Sylvia	John Wirth	March 29, 2017	0.152
10	4	"Bad Mojo"	Abe Sylvia	Abe Sylvia & Ione Lloyd	April 5, 2017	0.145
11	5	"Pie a la Mojo"	Tim Southam	Joe R. Lansdale	April 12, 2017	0.253
12	6	"No Mo' Mojo"	Tim Southam	Nick Damici and Jim Mickle	April 19, 2017	0.167

=== Season 3 (2018) ===
The third season is inspired by The Two-Bear Mambo. The second episode, "Ho-Ho Mambo" was released online at AMC.com and Sundancetv.com a week before the scheduled March 14 on-air premiere.

No. overall	No. in season	Title	Directed by	Written by	Original release date	US viewers (millions)
13	1	"The Two-Bear Mambo"	Jim Mickle	Jim Mickle	March 7, 2018	0.225
14	2	"Ho-Ho Mambo"	Jim Mickle	Nick Damici	March 14, 2018	0.227
15	3	"T-Bone Mambo"	Abe Sylvia	John Wirth	March 21, 2018	N/A
16	4	"Senorita Mambo"	Abe Sylvia	John Wirth & Ione Lloyd	March 28, 2018	N/A
17	5	"Mambo No. 5"	Michael Katleman	Pam Veasey	April 4, 2018	N/A
18	6	"Monsoon Mambo"	Michael Katleman	Nick Damici & Jim Mickle	April 11, 2018	N/A

== Reception ==
On Rotten Tomatoes season 1 has an approval rating of 88% based on reviews from 24 critics.

== Tie-in ==
A collection called Hap and Leonard made up of previously published short stories (Hyenas, Veil’s Visit, Dead Aim) by Joe Lansdale as well as new content was published by Tachyon Publications in March 2016 as a tie-in to the TV series.
