= Veil's Visit: a Taste of Hap and Leonard =

1999 collection of stories and excerpts by Joe R. Lansdale

- Artwork by Timothy Truman
- Author: Joe R. Lansdale
- Cover artist: Tim Truman
- Language: English
- Series: Hap and Leonard
- Genre: Mystery/suspense
- Publisher: Subterranean Press
- Publication date: 1999
- Publication place: United States
- Media type: Print (hardcover, trade paperback)
- Pages: 160
- ISBN: 1-892284-41-3
- Preceded by: Rumble Tumble (1998)
- Followed by: Captains Outrageous (2001)

Veil's Visit: a Taste of Hap and Leonard is a collection of stories and excerpts by American author Joe R. Lansdale featuring his longtime protagonists Hap Collins and Leonard Pine. The eponymous first story was co-written by longtime Lansdale friend Andrew Vachss and ends with Lansdale "interviewing" his two heroes. This book was published by Subterranean Press as a limited edition hardcover and trade paperback and is long out of print. The interview and the stories "Veil's Visit" and "Death by Chili" were reprinted in the collections Hap and Leonard (2016) and The Big Book of Hap and Leonard (2018).

== Table of contents ==
- Introduction by Andrew Vachss
- "The Happy Accident of Hap and Leonard" by Joe R. Lansdale
- "Veil's Visit" by Joe R. Lansdale and Andrew Vachss
- "Death by Chili" by Joe R. Lansdale

Excerpts by Joe R. Lansdale

- Notes on the excerpts
- Savage Season
- Mucho Mojo
- The Two-Bear Mambo
- Bad Chili
- Rumble Tumble
- Captains Outrageous
- Joe R. Lansdale interviews Hap Collins and Leonard Pine
