= Mark V. Ziesing =

American small press publisher, bookseller

Mark V. Ziesing is an American small press publisher and bookseller, founded by Mark Ziesing (born 1953). Active as a bookseller, from 1972 to present; Ziesing was in publishing, from the mid-1980s into 1998. The Ziesing publishing imprint specialized in science fiction, horror, and other forms of speculative fiction. Originally based in Willimantic, Connecticut and in partnership with his brother Michael (born 1946), he published two books by Gene Wolfe under the name Ziesing Brothers.

He later published books by Philip K. Dick, Stephen King, Harlan Ellison, Howard Waldrop, Bruce Sterling, Joe R. Lansdale, and Lucius Shepard, among others. In 1989 he returned to his home state, to Shingletown, California, where he and his wife Cindy continue to operate a catalog-based book selling business under the name Ziesing Books.

== Publications ==
Unless specified, all editions are hardcover and first publications. For most there was also a signed, numbered, limited edition in a slipcase, and for a very few there was an "ultra-limited" version: The Night of the Cooters ultra-limited came with a martin base statue to hold the book, and the Mefisto in Onyx ultra-limited included an actual cage for the book.

- 1982/??: Gene Wolfe - The Castle of the Otter (nonfiction collection) [Ziesing Brothers]
- 1984/01: Gene Wolfe - The Wolfe Archipelago (novella collection) [Ziesing Brothers]
- 1984/06: Philip K. Dick - The Man Whose Teeth Were All Exactly Alike (hardback and trade paperback)
- 1984/12: Gene Wolfe - Free Live Free
- 1985/01: A. A. Attanasio - Beastmarks (story collection)
- 1985/09: Ian Watson - The Book of Ian Watson (story collection)
- 1986/??: Michael Bishop - To a Chimp Held Captive For Purposes of Research (reprint; poem broadside; illustrated by J. K. Potter)
- 1986/02: Philip K. Dick - The Man Whose Teeth Were All Exactly Alike (softcover reprint)
- 1988/02: Thomas M. Disch - The Silver Pillow (novelette; soft- and hardcover editions)
- 1988/04: Lucius Shepard - The Scalehunter’s Beautiful Daughter (novella)
- 1988/10: James P. Blaylock - The Last Coin (signed/limited edition only; precedes the trade edition)
- 1988/12: Philip K. Dick - The Dark Haired Girl (collection of previously unpublished fiction and non-fiction)
- 1989/04: Howard Waldrop - A Dozen Tough Jobs (novella)
- 1989/04: Howard Waldrop - Them Bones (reprint; first hardcover; the limited edition of this and A Dozen Tough Jobs were sold as a slipcased set)
- 1989/05: Iain M. Banks - The State of the Art (novella)
- 1989/07: John M. Skipp & Craig Spector, editors - The Book of the Dead (anthology)
- 1989/09: Tim Powers - The Anubis Gates (reprint; first US hardcover) [first book published in Shingletown]
- 1989/12: Joe R. Lansdale - By Bizarre Hands (story collection)
- 1989/12: Journal Wired (trade paperback magazine)
- 1990/02: Ray Garton - Trade Secrets
- 1990/05: Journal Wired #2 (trade paperback magazine)
- 1990/05: Kim Stanley Robinson - A Short, Sharp Shock (novella)
- 1990/07: Joe R. Lansdale - Cold in July (reprint; first hardcover; the limited edition of this and Savage Season were sold as a slipcased set)
- 1990/07: Joe R. Lansdale - Savage Season
- 1990/08: Gardner Dozois, et al. - Slow Dancing Through Time (collaborative story collection; co-published with Ursus Imprints)
- 1990/10: Journal Wired #3 (trade paperback magazine)
- 1990/12: Howard Waldrop - Night of the Cooters (story collection; co-published with Ursus Imprints)
- 1991/02: Neal Barrett, Jr. - The Hereafter Gang
- 1991/06: Richard T. Chizmar, editor - Cold Blooded (anthology)
- 1991/09: Ray Garton - Lot Lizards
- 1992/02: John Shirley - Wetbones
- 1992/04: Wayne Allen Sallee - The Holy Terror
- 1992/07: John M. Skipp & Craig Spector, editors - Still Dead (anthology)
- 1992/09: Bruce Sterling - Globalhead (story collection)
- 1993/02: Richard Laymon - Alarms
- 1993/04: Lucius Shepard - The Golden
- 1993/09: Pat Cadigan - Dirty Work (story collection)
- 1993/12: Harlan Ellison - Mefisto in Onyx (expanded reprint; novella)
- 1994/03: Harlan Ellison - Mefisto in Onyx (second printing with slight corrections)
- 1994/07: David J. Schow - Black Leather Required (story collection)
- 1994/07: Lucius Shepard - Sports & Music (chapbook; story collection)
- 1994/08: Stephen King - Insomnia (done in a signed limited and unsigned "gift" editions; the true first edition of this King novel, preceding the trade edition)
- 1994/12: Connie Willis - Remake (novella)
- 1994/12: Richard T. Chizmar, editor - The Earth Strikes Back (softcover; anthology)
- 1995/02: Michael Moorcock - Lunching With the Anti-Christ (related story collection)
- 1995/03: Nancy A. Collins - Walking Wolf
- 1996/03: Brian Stableford - The Hunger and Ecstasy of Vampires
- 1996/11: John Shirley - Silicon Embrace
- 1996/11: Michael Whelan - Something in My Eye (art poster book, done in both hardcover and softcover editions)
- 1997/04: Harlan Ellison - Slippage (story collection)
- 1997/09: Kim Newman & Eugene Byrne - Back in the USSA (linked short story collection)
- 1998/05: John Shirley - Black Butterflies: A Flock on the Dark Side (softcover; story collection)

== Miscellaneous ==
- A Handbook of American Prayer, a novella by Lucius Shepard, was originally scheduled for publication by Ziesing circa 1998, but was never published. A novel version appeared in 2004 from Four Walls Eight Windows.
- Alien Graffiti, a collection of selected nonfiction by Michael Bishop was originally scheduled for publication by Ziesing circa 1986/87. A nonfiction collection by Bishop from PS Publishing appeared in 2005 entitled A Reverie for Mister Ray.
