= Black Lizard (publisher) =

American book publisher

- Parent company: Creative Arts Book Company
- Status: Purchased in 1990; merged with Vintage Crime
- Founded: 1984
- Founder: Barry Gifford
- Successor: Vintage Crime/Black Lizard
- Country of origin: United States
- Headquarters location: Berkeley, California
- Publication types: Books
- Fiction genres: Mystery

Black Lizard was an American book publisher. A division of the Creative Arts Book Company of Berkeley, California, Black Lizard specialized in reprinting forgotten crime fiction and noir fiction writers and novels originally released between the 1930s and the 1960s, many of which are now acknowledged as classics of their genres.

== History ==
Founded and edited by writer Barry Gifford in 1984, Black Lizard released over ninety books between 1984 and 1990, including reprints of classic novels by Charles Willeford, David Goodis, Peter Rabe, Harry Whittington, Dan J. Marlowe, Charles Williams, and Lionel White, as well as original novels by Barry Gifford and Jim Nisbet. Lizard is single-handedly responsible for renewing the interest in Jim Thompson in the late 1980s, which resulted in several film adaptations of his novels. The original series were mass-market paperbacks with covers drawn by Jim Kirwan.

Barry Gifford's relationship with Black Lizard is also sometimes credited with having first applied the term noir fiction to a certain subgenre of hardboiled fiction. Thus, in an introduction written by Gifford to the Black Lizard editions of Jim Thompson's novels in 1984, Gifford writes: "The French seem to appreciate best Thompson's brand of terror. Roman noir, literally 'black novel,' is a term reserved especially for novelists such as Thompson, Cornell Woolrich and David Goodis. Only Thompson, however, fulfills the French notion of both noir and maudit, the accursed and self-destructive. It is an unholy picture that Thompson presents. As the British critic Nick Kimberley has written, 'This is a godless world,' populated by persons 'for whom murder is a casual chore.'" Gifford's use of the term noir in this context resulted in a term that is narrower in scope than that used by the French roman noir as applied to fiction. In 2021, Willy Vlautin wrote: "Those Black Lizard books were about psychologically damaged people trying to navigate a cruel, cutthroat world that didn't want them in the first place."

Random House bought the rights to the Black Lizard name in June 1990 and merged it with Vintage Crime: Vintage Crime/Black Lizard was the result. Many of Black Lizards' earlier releases were replaced by mainstream-friendly writers such as Dashiell Hammett, Raymond Chandler, James M. Cain, as well as numerous contemporary authors, including Jason Starr, whose noir crime novel Hard Feelings was Vintage Crime/Black Lizard’s first ever original novel. The mass-market paperbacks were replaced by trade paperbacks with black-and-white photographs on the covers. Most of the series was reprinted in this new format, but practically all of the books published by Lizard before the merge, with the notable exception of books by Jim Thompson, have since been allowed to fall out of print and have remained so since the early 1990s.
