= Sunset and Sawdust =

2005 novel by Joe R. Lansdale

- Author: Joe R. Lansdale
- Cover artist: Peter Mendelsund & Carol Devine Carson
- Language: English
- Genre: Crime/Mystery/Suspense/Thriller
- Publisher: Vintage Crime/Black Lizard
- Publication date: 4 January 2005
- Publication place: United States
- Media type: Print (Trade paperback)
- Pages: 336
- ISBN: 9780375719226

Sunset and Sawdust is a crime filled "whodunit" type novel by Joe R Lansdale published in 2005 by Vintage Crime/black Lizard.

== Plot ==
Sunset Jones is a beautiful red-headed woman and wife in East Texas in the 1930s. One night during a cyclone Sunset gets fed up of all the rape and abuse being done onto her by her husband, Pete, that she shoots him dead. Her husband Pete however was the constable of the nearby town known as Camp Rapture. Soon the town gets a new sheriff as Sunset's mother-in-law arranges for her to take over Pete's duties. This was not accepted by some of the residents in town. Soon Sunset will find out more about the town as a double homicide takes place. Her investigation to seek justice and answers will pull her into a journey filled with greed, deceit, double-dealings, and unthinkable acts of maliciousness. Sunset will need to uncover the truth of what is really going on with the help of her own posse.

== Publication ==
New York, NY United States

== Reception ==
Sunset and Sawdust has been received well by its readers with a majority of them applauding Joe R. Lansdale's ability to tell a story.

"Sunset and Sawdust is filled with turns and twists, nastiness, broad humor, moments of grace. . . . Lansdale is a storyteller in the great American tradition.” –The Boston Globe

"Lansdale is an exceptional storyteller . . . readers will feel the Texas heat and hear the story in the author's unique East Texas drawl. The vivid characterization will make readers cheer for the protagonist and boo the villain." --Rocky Mountain News

“Sunset Jones is the kind of woman that men who drink in East Texas bars would call a ‘pistol.’ As a tornado rips through the sawmill camp town of Rapture, in the rousing opening scene of Joe R. Lansdale’s historical barnburner Sunset and Sawdust, Sunset finally puts a stop to her husband Pete's bloody beatings. . . . Soon Sunset has her own posse, including a wonderful dog whose abject adoration of the fiery gunslinger pretty much sums up this reader's feelings.” --The New York Times Book Review

Publishers Weekly says, "The book opens with a cyclone, ends with a plague of grasshoppers and in between there's insanity, extreme violence, sex, grotesques aplenty and an excellent dog. What's not to like?"
