= Vanilla Ride =

2009 novel written by Joe R. Lansdale

- Knopf edition cover
- Author: Joe R. Lansdale
- Cover artist: Jackie Alpers
- Language: English
- Series: Hap and Leonard
- Genre: Crime/suspense
- Publisher: Knopf, Vintage Crime/Black Lizard
- Publication date: 2009
- Publication place: United States
- Media type: Print (Hardcover, Trade paperback)
- Pages: 243
- ISBN: 978-0-307-27097-9
- Preceded by: Captains Outrageous (2001)
- Followed by: Devil Red (2011)

Vanilla Ride is a crime fiction novel written by American author Joe R. Lansdale. It is the eighth book in the Hap and Leonard series. Published in 2009, it is the first in the book in the series since Captains Outrageous in 2001.

== Plot summary ==
When an old friend asks Leonard Pine to rescue his daughter from a drug dealer, Leonard accepts and of course brings his sidekick and best friend Hap Collins along for backup. With much violence and gunplay they rescue the daughter and end up taking down the drug dealer in the process. The problem is the dealer is a low level member of the Texas crime syndicate The Dixie Mafia. The Dixie Mafia figures some payback is in order and enlist the deadly assassin Vanilla Ride to carry out the hit.

== Editions ==
This book was originally published by Alfred A. Knopf publications in 2009 as a hardcover and by Vintage Crime/Black Lizard publications as a trade paperback in 2011.
