= Rumble Tumble =

1998 novel by Joe R. Lansdale

- Limited Subterranean Press cover
- Author: Joe R. Lansdale
- Cover artist: Gail Cross
- Language: English
- Series: Hap and Leonard
- Genre: Mystery/suspense
- Publisher: Subterranean Press, Mysterious Press, Vintage Crime/Black Lizard
- Publication date: 1998
- Publication place: United States
- Media type: Print (Hardcover, Trade paperback)
- Pages: 229
- ISBN: 0-9649890-9-3
- Preceded by: Bad Chili (1997)
- Followed by: Veil's Visit: a Taste of Hap and Leonard (1999)

Rumble Tumble is a 1998 suspense crime novel written by American author Joe R. Lansdale. It is the fifth in the series of his Hap and Leonard mysteries. According to WorldCat, it is held in 573 libraries.

== Plot summary ==
The story centers around Hap's girlfriend Brett's daughter Tillie, who has spent the majority of her adult life as a prostitute, and is suffering abuse at the hands of her pimp. Hap and Leonard attempt to rescue her, and come into conflict with the Dixie Mafia as a result. The two protagonists end up traveling from Oklahoma to the Mexican border, with much violence taking place along with way.

== Editions ==
This book was initially published as a limited edition by Subterranean Press and then as a trade hardcover by Mysterious Press. Both of these editions are out of print. Vintage Crime/Black Lizard published a trade paperback in 2009.

Mysterious Press edition
