= Captains Outrageous =

2001 novel written by Joe R. Lansdale

- Subterranean Press edition cover
- Author: Joe R. Lansdale
- Cover artist: John Picacio
- Language: English
- Series: Hap and Leonard
- Genre: Crime/suspense
- Publisher: Subterranean Press, Mysterious Press, Vintage Crime/Black Lizard
- Publication date: 2001
- Publication place: United States
- Media type: Print (Hardcover, Trade paperback)
- Pages: 323
- ISBN: 1-931081-28-X
- Preceded by: Veil's Visit: a Taste of Hap and Leonard (1999)
- Followed by: Vanilla Ride (2009)

Captains Outrageous is a suspense/crime novel written by American author Joe R. Lansdale, the sixth novel in the Hap and Leonard series of books.

== Plot summary ==
The novel opens with both Hap Collins and Leonard Pine working as a security guards at a chicken plant. One night Hap saves the owner's daughter from a violent rapist, and the owner rewards him with hundred thousand dollars. Hap and Leonard take a cruise, but they get into a dispute with the ship's maitre de about protocol and find themselves marooned in Mexico. While there they are mugged, and then rescued by a fisherman named Ferdinand and his daughter Beatrice. Hap forms a sexual relationship with Beatrice while the two stay with them, and discovers that she owes a large amount of money to a local gangster named Juan Miguel. Just before they leave to go back to Mexico, Beatrice is violently murdered, presumably by Juan Miguel's thugs.

Once back in Texas, Hap and Leonard attempt to move past the events of the last few days, but when their friend Charlie is killed they realise that Juan Miguel is attempting to silence them. Along with their associate, a detective named Jim Bob, and Hap's main girlfriend Brett, they return to Mexico to finish matters. They first attempt to stage a kidnapping of Juan Miguel's favorite mistress, but this attempt goes awry and some deaths of friends and associates occurs. Deciding that matters must be settled in the most direct and uncomplicated manner possible, Hap breaks into Juan Miguel's compound, hides in his backyard and executes him, along with his extreme henchman, Hammerhead. At the novel's conclusion Leonard has a new job and Hap returns to his old one; Hap and Brett are now back together.

== Reception ==
Captains Outrageous has received positive reviews from critics, with Publishers Weekly saying that "Lansdale's quick wit is in top form, and his raunchy, sometimes ridiculous and yet so lovable heroes continue to amuse."

== Editions ==
Mysterious Press edition

This book was originally published as a limited edition hardcover by Subterranean Press and as a trade hardcover by Mysterious Press. Both of these editions are out of print. In 2009, it was reissued as a trade paperback by Vintage Crime/Black Lizard Publications.
