= Born for Trouble =

Born for Trouble may refer to:

- Born for Trouble (1942 film), American B-film, directed by B. Reeves Eason, starring Van Johnson and Faye Emerson
- Born for Trouble (1955 film), British production directed by Desmond Davis, starring Joan Shawlee
- Born for Trouble (album), 1990 release by Willie Nelson
- Born for Trouble: The Further Adventures of Hap and Leonard, 2022 book by Joe R. Lansdale
