= Devil Red =

Novel by Joe R. Lansdale

- Knopf edition cover
- Author: Joe R. Lansdale
- Cover artist: Jason Booher
- Language: English
- Series: Hap and Leonard
- Genre: Crime/suspense
- Publisher: Knopf, Vintage Crime/Black Lizard
- Publication date: 2011
- Publication place: United States
- Media type: Print (Hardcover, Trade paperback)
- Pages: 205
- ISBN: 978-0-307-45546-8
- Preceded by: Vanilla Ride (2009)
- Followed by: Hyenas: a Hap and Leonard Novella (2012)

Devil Red is a crime mystery novel written by American author Joe R. Lansdale. It is the ninth novel in Lansdale's Hap and Leonard series.

== Plot summary ==
In this story Hap Collins and Leonard Pine are hired by a former police officer turned private investigator to investigate a cold case double homicide. As they get further into the investigation, they encounter The Dixie Mafia organized crime syndicate, a vampire cult, and a deadly assassin, Devil Red.

== Editions ==
Vintage Crime/Black Lizard edition

This book was originally published by Alfred A. Knopf Publications as a trade hardcover in 2011 and was re-issued as a trade paperback by Vintage Crime/Black Lizard in 2012.
