= Hap and Leonard =

Hap Collins and Leonard Pine
- Promotional poster for the TV series adapted from the books
- First appearance: Savage Season
- Created by: Joe R. Lansdale
- Portrayed by: James Purefoy (Hap); Michael K. Williams (Leonard)

In-universe information
- Gender: Male
- Occupation: Private investigators
- Nationality: American

Hap and Leonard are two fictional amateur investigators and adventurers created by American author Joe R. Lansdale. They are the main characters in a series of fifteen novels, four novellas, and three collections of stories and excerpts. They are two very different men and the best of friends, and now work together as private investigators for Hap's girlfriend Brett Sawyer. Together they always wind up in a lot of trouble with various criminal types in the fictional town of LaBorde, in East Texas and often find themselves attempting to solve various unpleasant and brutal crimes. Both men are well versed in the martial arts. The novels were adapted into a 2016–2018 TV series, produced by SundanceTV. The duo were partially inspired by The Hardman series by the late Ralph Dennis.

Lansdale’s forthcoming 2026 novel, Petrified Dreams, will be the final book in the series.

== Characters ==
=== Hap Collins ===
Hap Collins is a white working class laborer who spent time in federal prison as a young man for refusing to be drafted into the military and serve in the Vietnam War. In his late forties, he is often haunted by the various unpleasant jobs he's held over the years such as working at an aluminum chair factory and working the East Texas rose fields. Hap tries his best to avoid violence. He often broods, sometimes sinking into bouts of depression, after resorting to violence in which he or someone else, even those who attack him, are injured. Hap sometimes allows his sense of compassion and respect for life to override his judgment, such as often allowing attackers who mean to kill him to live. Often lovesick, most of his relationships haven't worked out. He is currently with his on-again-off-again girlfriend Brett Sawyer. Some of his past has been taken from Mr. Lansdale's own past. The stories are told from Hap's narrative point of view. Not as quick to anger as Leonard, he often finds himself attempting to talk Leonard out of committing serious violence.

=== Leonard Pine ===
Leonard Pine is a gay, black Vietnam vet with serious anger issues. He was raised by his uncle who shunned him after learning he was gay. However, when his uncle passes away, he leaves his house and all his assets to Leonard. Leonard has zero tolerance for racist or anti-gay slurs. Although Hap dislikes guns, Leonard has no problem carrying or using them. Quick to anger, at times he cannot understand Hap's aversion to violence or killing if necessary, even when provoked. His relationships are also short and tempestuous. Leonard is the much more aggressive of the two and repeatedly burned down a local crack house that used to be his new next door neighbor. After living with Hap and Brett for a while, he recently moved into his own place. Much to Hap's dismay, Leonard has a habit of wearing ugly hats.

== On the characters' ages ==
Though Hap Collins and Leonard Pine are Vietnam veterans, the years in which their subsequent adventures take place are unclear and inconsistent with linear time. According to Lansdale:

[T]hey have a different relationship with time than the rest of us.

I let them age, but I have never done it on a year-by-year basis. Like Travis McGee, Philip Marlowe, James Bond, and numerous other fictional characters, they move at a different pace and have multiple adventures that no living person might have in a lifetime, or two.

I consider a year when I do not write about them to be a year in which they remain, time-wise, in amber. When I return to them, or they return to me, the clock starts again, though I don’t worry if it’s the year it should be after their last adventure. If I wait eight years between novels, or what have you, they are only slightly older than when I ceased writing about them eight years before. Their current adventure will take place in the current year, which means they do not maintain a realistic chronology. I may even decide to write about them when they are younger, or middle-aged. I get to choose.

== Television adaptation ==
Film duo Nick Damici and Jim Mickle developed a Hap and Leonard crime and suspense TV series for SundanceTV. On November 10, 2014, Sundance green-lit the series for six one-hour episodes, starring James Purefoy as Hap and Michael K. Williams as Leonard, which filmed in 2015 and premiered on March 2, 2016. SundanceTV renewed the series for a second six-episode season based on the second novel Mucho Mojo. A third season inspired by The Two-Bear Mambo was also produced.

On May 14, 2018, SundanceTV announced they had cancelled the series after three seasons.

== List of works featuring Hap and Leonard ==
1. Savage Season (1990)
2. Mucho Mojo (1994)
3. The Two-Bear Mambo (1995)
4. Bad Chili (1997)
5. Rumble Tumble (1998)
6. Veil's Visit: a Taste of Hap and Leonard (1999) (short stories and excerpts written with Andrew Vachss)
7. Captains Outrageous (2001)
8. Vanilla Ride (2009)
9. Devil Red (2011)
10. Hyenas: a Hap and Leonard Novella (2011, novella)
11. Dead Aim (2013, novella)
12. Honky Tonk Samurai (2016)
13. Briar Patch Boogie (2016, novellette)
14. Hap and Leonard (2016, short story collection)
15. Hap and Leonard Ride Again (2016, short story collection)
16. Miracles Ain't What They Used to Be (2016, a collection of stories and essays)
17. Coco Butternut: A Hap and Leonard Novella (2017, novella)
18. Rusty Puppy (2017)
19. Cold Cotton (2017, novella)
20. Hoodoo Harry (2017, novella)
21. Hap and Leonard: Blood and Lemonade (2017, Mosaic novel)
22. Jackrabbit Smile (2018)
23. The Big Book of Hap and Leonard (2018, short story collection, ebook)
24. The Elephant of Surprise (2019)
25. Of Mice and Minestrone (2020, short story collection)
26. Born For Trouble: The Further Adventures of Hap and Leonard (2022, collection of 5 novellas.)
27. Sugar on the Bones (2024)
28. Hatchet Girls (2025)
29. Petrified Dreams (2026)

== Graphic novels ==
A series of graphic novels were published in 2017.
