= The Man Whose Teeth Were All Exactly Alike =

Novel by Philip K. Dick

- Dust jacket from the first edition
- Author: Philip K. Dick
- Cover artist: Dell Harris
- Language: English
- Genre: Novel
- Publisher: Mark V. Ziesing
- Publication date: 1984
- Publication place: United States
- Media type: Print (Hardback)
- Pages: 223
- ISBN: 0-9612970-0-X
- OCLC: 11304017
- Dewey Decimal: 813/.54 20
- LC Class: PS3554.I3 M27 1984

The Man Whose Teeth Were All Exactly Alike is a realist, non-science fiction novel by American writer Philip K. Dick. Originally completed in 1960, this book was initially rejected by potential publishers, and posthumously published by a small press in 1984, two years after Dick's death.

== Plot summary ==
Sometime between 1958 and 1962, Leo Runcible, a liberal Jew, is working in the real estate field. On learning that Walt Dombrosio, Leo's neighbor, has had a Black visitor to his house in a "lily-white" suburb of Marin County, California, potential purchasers interrogate Runcible about the matter and ultimately incur his wrath over their narrow-minded bigotry. He thereby fails to close the deal and forfeits their friendship and a precious commission as well.

But according to Leo's tortured logic it is Walt who's at fault for this unforeseen little debacle. So in retaliation Runcible opportunistically reports Dombrosio's later episode of drunk driving, leading to the loss of the latter's motor vehicle operator's license for a period of six months.

Walt's wife Sherry then drives him to and from work every day, eventually landing a job working alongside her husband. Walt, however, being as he is an insecure, misogynistic, manipulating headcase, quits his own position over this incident and continues to fume over it as the weeks and months roll by. He eventually humiliates and manhandles his wife in front of their neighbors as a prelude to forcefully impregnating her with an unwanted child which she unsuccessfully threatens to abort.

At the same time, Runcible has found what he believes to be Neanderthal remains in Carquinez, Marin County, and envisages rising property prices due to incipient archaeological interest and the avalanche of media coverage that naturally follows. As it turns out, however, Dombrosio is the culprit who modified and planted the modern human remains there to begin with. They are a legacy of the local 'chuppers' who developed facial, cranial and spinal deformations as a supposed result of the pollution of the local water supply.

The novel ends around Christmas - Dombrosio's situation is at status quo ante: Sherry now back in the house and five months pregnant, having decided to forfeit her job in the city to keep the baby Dombrosio forced on her. He overhears a Christmas party in progress at the Runcible's home, and briefly contemplates visiting to end his dispute with Runcible before deciding against it. Dombrosio is then visited by a vision of a future with his little family several years later, after Sherry has presumably given birth to a malformed baby boy due to the possible teratogenic properties of the local water supply. This vision leaves Dombrosio shaken, as his wife realizes he shares the same fears about their unborn child.

Runcible faces bankruptcy, having decided to purchase the local water company to ensure high standards of water availability for the community. The purchase of the water company has cost Runcible considerably and he is unable to make the monthly payments due on his home. Despite his principled choice to serve clean water to the community regardless of the cost to himself, he remains consumed with anger and resentment against the local community for their ingratitude at his efforts to improve the area.
