= James Kisner =

American novelist

- Born: James M. Kisner, Jr. March 26, 1947; Evansville, Indiana
- Died: June 26, 2008 (aged 61); Evansville, Indiana
- Education: Indiana University Bloomington
- Occupation: Writer
- Spouse(s): Carole Kisner; Phyllis Kisner
- Children: 2
- Writing career
- Pen name: Martin James, Eric Flanders
- Period: 1981–1998
- Genre: Horror

James M. Kisner Jr. (March 26, 1947 – June 26, 2008) was an American novelist and short story writer, primarily of horror.

== Biography ==
=== Early life and education ===
James M. Kisner Jr. was born on March 26, 1947, in Evansville, Indiana to Norma and James M. Kisner. He had one brother, Dan, and graduated from Bosse High School in 1965. He earned a Bachelor of Arts and a Master of Arts degree in English at Indiana University Bloomington.

=== Career ===
Kisner began his career in advertising and wrote part-time, eventually leaving advertising to write full-time. His first novel, Nero's Vice, was published in 1981. He also published under the pseudonyms Martin James and Eric Flanders.

=== Marriage and children ===
Kisner married the former Carole Kleckner in 1969. The couple had fraternal twins, James M. Kisner, III and Jayne M. Kendall. Later in life, he married his second wife, Phyllis Kisner.

=== Death and afterward ===
James Kisner died at his home in Evansville due to accidental carbon monoxide poisoning. His wife, Phyllis Kisner, age 59, also died in the accident.

== Published works ==
=== Novels ===
- Nero's Vice, Beaufort, 1981
- Slice of Life, Zebra, 1982
- Strands, Leisure, 1988
- Night Glow (as Martin James), Pinnacle, 1989
- Zombie House (as Martin James), Pinnacle, 1990
- Poison Pen, Zebra, 1990
- Earth Blood, Zebra, 1990
- The Quagmire, Zebra, 1991
- The Forever Children (as Eric Flanders), Zebra, 1992
- Night Blood (as Eric Flanders), Zebra, 1993
- Tower of Evil, Leisure, 1994

=== Short stories ===
- "The Litter", Masques 2 (1987)
- "Manny Agonistes", Scare Care (1989)
- "The Willies" (1989)
- "Something Extra" (1990) (with J.N. Williamson)
- "Self-Esteem" (1991)
- "The Defiance of the Ugly by the Merely Repulsive" (1993)
- "Ground Water", The Earth Strikes Back (1994)
- "God-Less Men" (1995)

Anthologies containing short stories by James Kisner:
Masques 3 (1989)
Urban Horrors (1990)
Short Sharp Shocks (1990)
Hotter Blood: More Tales of Erotic Horror (1991)
Predators (1993)
Vampire Detectives (1995)
Southern Blood: Vampire Stories from the American South (1997)
Vampire Slayers: Stories of Those Who Dare to Take Back the Night (1999)
