= Bad Chili =

1997 novel by Joe R. Lansdale

- Limited Mojo Press cover
- Author: Joe R. Lansdale
- Cover artist: John Picacio
- Language: English
- Series: Hap and Leonard
- Genre: Mystery/suspense
- Publisher: Mysterious Press; Mojo Press; Vintage Crime/Black Lizard
- Publication date: September 1, 1997
- Publication place: United States
- Media type: Print (hardcover, paperback)
- Pages: 219
- ISBN: 1-885418-15-9
- Preceded by: The Two-Bear Mambo (1995)
- Followed by: Rumble Tumble (1998)

Bad Chili is a 1997 crime mystery novel by American author Joe R. Lansdale. It is the fourth in the series of books featuring Lansdale's longtime protagonists Hap and Leonard. The two characters couldn't be more different; Hap is a white working class laborer who went to prison to protest the Vietnam War, and Leonard is a gay, black, Vietnam vet with serious anger issues. Both are experts in the martial arts and are the best of friends.

== Plot summary ==
Hap returns from his off-shore oil platform job to discover that his best friend Leonard is being framed for a series of murders. The first of these is a biker who stole Leonard's boyfriend, and the second is Leonard's ex-boyfriend himself. The two of them set out to find who the real killers are and clear Leonard's name.

== Editions ==
This book was first published by the now defunct Mojo Press with only 500 signed copies. It was then published as a mass-market trade hardcover by Mysterious Press. It was re-issued as a trade paperback in May 2009 by Vintage Crime/Black Lizard books.

Mysterious Press edition
