= Eclipse Trilogy =

English-language book series

The Eclipse Trilogy (also referred to as A Song Called Youth trilogy) is a series of three English language cyberpunk science fiction novels by John Shirley consisting of Eclipse (1985), Eclipse Penumbra (1988), and Eclipse Corona (1990).

The books depict a dystopian future, set in a hypothetical mid 21st century where a new Russian Soviet has invaded Western Europe, causing massive disruption and destruction. Their armies were only repelled by the (unseen) use of tactical nuclear weapons, resulting in a stalemate, somewhat like the middle years of World War I. The New Soviet—more oligarchic than communist—has been stymied. But now Europe is in chaos, the USA is in crisis. To keep order and free up troops for actual fighting, NATO has contracted with the Second Alliance Security Corporation (SA), a right-wing, private security company of mercenaries, an anticipation of Blackwater-style privatization of the military. Second Alliance is part of a hidden (fascist) agenda unbeknownst to most of those who hired them. The heroes of the series are the New Resistance, who are fighting to expose and defeat the SA's racist policies and the neofascist attempt to grab power.

The scope of the story is worldwide, but the main action mostly takes place in Europe, on a small Caribbean island and on humanity's first space colony.

On the book jacket of the 2012 re-release, William Gibson calls Shirley "cyberpunk's patient zero", and Bruce Sterling calls the trilogy "a complex, bizarre, and unique vision of the near future, with a kaleidoscopic mix of politics, pop, and paranoia."

An updated, re-edited version of the trilogy has been released by Dover Books, starting with A Song Called Youth: Eclipse, in October 2017. All three books are out now, from Dover, and still in print.

== Characters ==
- "Smiling" Rick Crandall is the leader of the SA is a charismatic American preacher/televangelist
- Steinfeld is the leader of the New Resistance (NR), a former Mossad agent
- Jack "Smoke" Brendon is a former professor, the public face of the NR. He is the first character we meet, disillusioned and living in a bombed out Amsterdam
- Dan "Hard-Eyes" Torrence is the NR's best fighter
- Claire Rimpler is the protected daughter of the man who runs the space colony, FirStep

== Technologies and advances ==
Various technologies and societal changes are employed in this fictional world, and help define it while also anticipating the future through extrapolation and/or speculation. Among these are:

- Extraction is a tactic used by both sides in the war. The term is applied to both the process of removing memories from an enemy to find out secrets and the process of implanting other memories that can go as far as altering one's identity and changing one's allegiance.
- Orbiting space colony - FirStep has its own gravity and a vulnerable environment that plays a key role in the action of the trilogy.
- Removable mind implants - Characters exchange mind implants and otherwise interface with them. These removable implants (like memory chips or USB ports) are controlled or accessed using fingernail taps. This augmentation is viewed with suspicion and is essentially outlawed in the United States, where some key figures are jailed for its use. While this is a common feature in other cyberpunk literature, Shirley's deep exploration of this is notable.
- Surreptitious aerial surveillance - Artificial birds that are barely distinguishable from real ones act much like drones that take pictures and otherwise spy and surveil.
- Jaegernauts - Large rolling war machines that can destroy entire city blocks, high rises and other large buildings.
- Technicki – A somewhat subversive language developed by the working class, poorly understood and not well tolerated by others.
- Buildings as drugs - As with other cyberpunk literature, intoxication has also changed with advances in technology, chemistry and other factors. In one scene in the second novel, a character ascends higher into a "place that is a drug," where atmospheric stimulants ranging from mists to light stimulation deepen his intoxication. "Instead of you swallowing the drug, the drug swallows you."
