= The Dark Haired Girl =

Book by Philip K. Dick

- Dust-jacket from the first edition
- Author: Philip K. Dick
- Language: English
- Genre: Essays, poems and letters
- Publisher: Mark V. Ziesing
- Publication date: 1988
- Publication place: United States
- Media type: Print (hardback)
- Pages: 249 pp
- ISBN: 0-929480-03-1
- OCLC: 19561157
- Dewey Decimal: 813/.54 20
- LC Class: PS3554.I3 D37 1988

The Dark Haired Girl is a collection of essays, poems and letters by Philip K. Dick. It was first published by Mark V. Ziesing in 1989.

Ziesing considers this the necessary companion volume to the complete collected works of the author. The letters, in particular, provide graphic evidence of Dick's all-too-human qualities within the context of his multiple relationships and/or marriages.

== Contents ==
- Introduction, by Paul Williams
- "The Dark-Haired Girl"
- The Android and the Human
- poem
- The Evolution of a Vital Love
- letters, to Edgar Dick
- Man, Android and Machine
- letter, to Laura Dick
- "Goodbye, Vincent"
