= Silicon Embrace =

1996 novel by John Shirley

- Author: John Shirley
- Language: English
- Genre: Science fiction
- Publisher: Mark V. Ziesing
- Publication date: November 1996
- Publication place: United States
- Pages: 282

Silicon Embrace is a 1996 science fiction novel by American author John Shirley, first published by Mark V. Ziesing. It follows a group of journalists covering the second American civil war, but end up dealing with alien races who are interfering. Critical reception was slightly positive, with notable detractors in part due to the controversial themes and elements present in the novel.

== Plot ==
Set in the near future, Silicon Embrace tells the story of a group of journalists in the course of a Second American Civil War. The second civil war in the story is between "religious and ethnic" factions. The main characters get involved in a plot set by obscure entities within the US government together with an alien race from Zeta Reticuli, called the Zetans, who are supposedly friendly to Earth. A second group of aliens, called the Meta, are initially considered hostile. As the novel progresses, layers are peeled away and some of the truth, but not all of it, is revealed.

== Publication history ==
Silicon Embrace was first published by Mark V. Ziesing in November 1996. It was reissued by Night Shade Books in 2014.

== Reception ==
Reviews for Silicon Embrace were positive, but had notable detractors. Kirkus Reviews wrote that the story has "thrills and spills" but that Shirley's own "private theology" is too obvious in the story. The Library Journal review considered the book a "marginal purchase" for libraries. The Washington Post called the novel a "hybrid sf/horror novel that may satisfy neither camp." Publishers Weekly was more friendly in their review, writing that readers who enjoy conspiracy theories and New Age myths, along with UFOs will enjoy the book. The San Francisco Chronicle observed that it seemed to be both derivative of the X-Files and too "weird and unsettling" to have universal appeal, but that it would be popular within its niche. The Des Moines Register thought that the X-Files comparison was understating it, adding that it was mixed with "the mysticism of Ghandi [sic] [and] the breakneck-speed plotting of a Harrison Ford adventure film".
