= Cellars (novel) =

1982 novel by John Shirley

Cellars is a novel by John Shirley published in 1982.

== Plot summary ==
Cellars is a novel in which a journalist in New York becomes attracted to a woman with extra-sensory abilities. This leads him down a "rabbit hole" into the secrets hidden under Manhattan.

== Reception ==
Dave Pringle reviewed Cellars for Imagine magazine, and stated that "Although entirely different in tone, it shows the same obsession with things lurking beneath our feet, unnameable terrors in the forgotten 'cellars' of modern civilisation."

== Reviews ==
- Review by William Gibson (1982) in Science Fiction Review, Fall 1982
- Review by Thomas M. Disch (1982) in Rod Serling's The Twilight Zone Magazine, November 1982
