= The Earth Strikes Back =

Ecological horror short story collection

- First edition
- Editor: Richard T. Chizmar
- Language: English
- Genre: ecological horror, horror, science fiction
- Publisher: White Wolf Publishing
- Publication date: 1994
- ISBN: 1-56504-919-5

The Earth Strikes Back is a short story collection edited by Richard Chizmar published by White Wolf in 1994.

== Plot summary ==
The Earth Strikes Back is a compilation of 20 ecological horror stories specially written for this publication.

== Contents ==
- "My Copsa Micas", by Dan Simmons
- "Harvest", by Norman Partridge
- "Toxic Wastrels", by Poppy Z. Brite
- "The Forest Is Crying", by Charles De Lint
- "I Remember Me", by Thomas Tessier
- "Ground Water", by James Kisner
- "Cages", by Ed Gorman
- "Where It's Safe", by John Shirley
- "Expiration Date", by William Relling Jr.
- "The Dreaded Hobblobs", by Gary A. Braunbeck
- "Cancer Alley", by Nancy A. Collins
- "Binary", by Roman A. Ranieri
- "Tyrophex-Fourteen", by Ronald Kelly
- "Torrent", by Mark Rainey
- "Toxic Shock", by Rick Hautala
- "Please Stand By", by Thomas F. Monteleone
- "Double-Edged Sword", by Barry Hoffman
- "The Fur Coat", by Richard Laymon
- "Do Not Pass Go Do Not Collect $200", by Chelsea Quinn Yarbro
- "Genesis II", by Hugh B. Cave

== Reception ==
Andy Butcher reviewed The Earth Strikes Back for Arcane magazine, rating it a 9 out of 10 overall. Butcher comments that "it's well worth the effort to track down, and very highly recommended" and called it "a superb work".

== Reviews ==
- Review by Peter Crowther (1995) in Interzone, #101 November 1995
- Review by Eric M. Eskenazi (1996) in Fangoria, May 1996
- Review by Don D'Ammassa (1996) in Science Fiction Chronicle, #190 October 1996
