= James Purefoy =

English actor (born 1964)

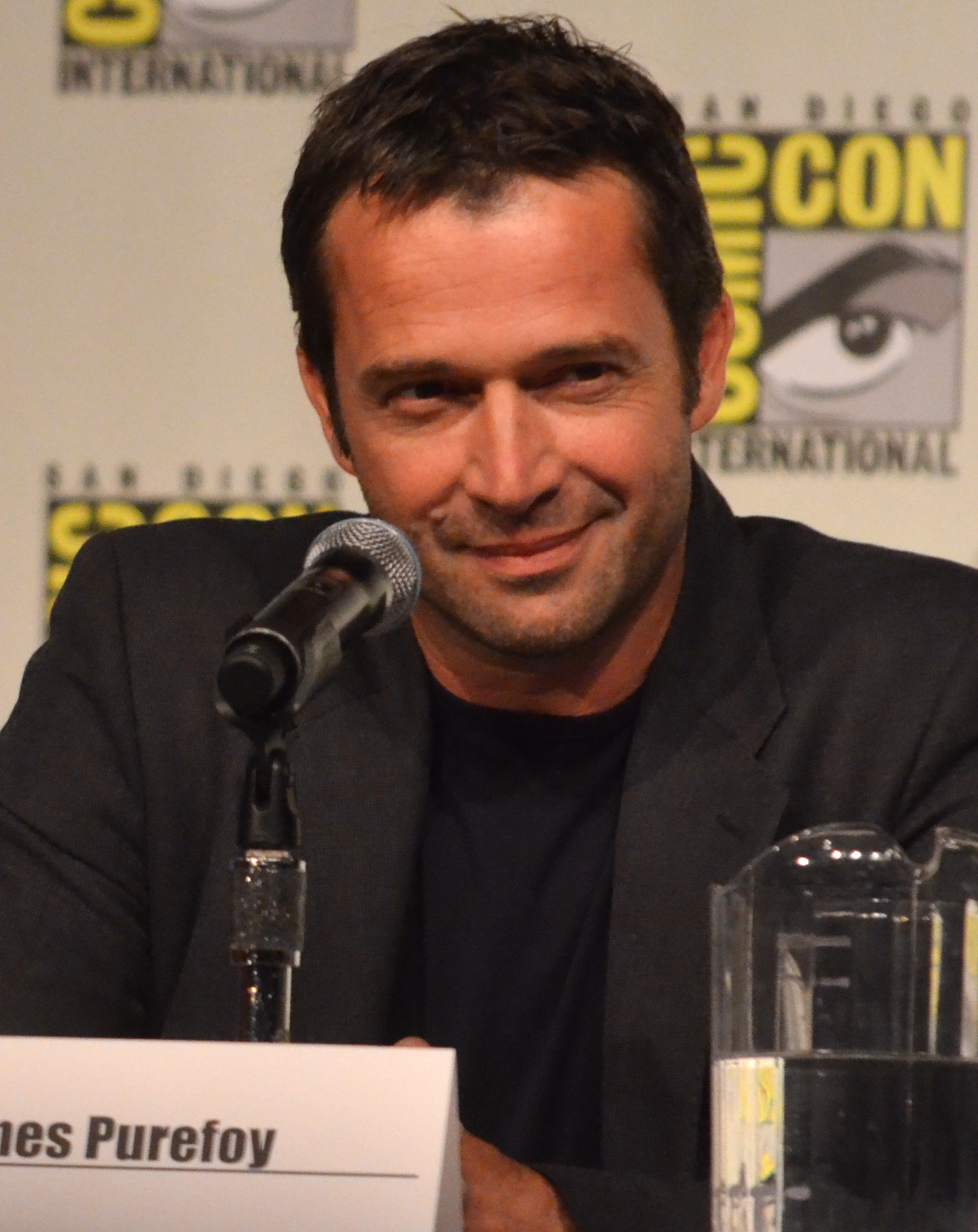
- Purefoy in 2012
- Born: James Brian Mark Purefoy; 3 June 1964 (age 62); Taunton, Somerset, England
- Education: Central School of Speech and Drama (BA)
- Occupation: Actor
- Years active: 1987–present
- Spouses: Holly Aird (m. 1996; div. 2002) Jessica Adams (m. 2014)
- Children: 4

James Brian Mark Purefoy (born 3 June 1964) is an English actor. He played Marcus Antonius in the HBO series Rome, Nick Jenkins in A Dance to the Music of Time, college professor turned serial killer Joe Carroll in the Fox thriller series The Following, Solomon Kane in the film of the same name, and Hap Collins in the Sundance series Hap and Leonard. Purefoy also played Lord Phillipe de Clermont in the second season of the hit AMC/Netflix series "A Discovery of Witches". In 2018, he starred as Laurens Bancroft in the first season of Altered Carbon, a Netflix original series. Following an uncredited role as V in the 2006 film V for Vendetta (replaced and dubbed over by Hugo Weaving), he was cast in a main role as Captain Gulliver "Gully" Troy / Captain Blighty in the 2020–2021 second and 2022 third season of the television series Pennyworth, the prequel to both Gotham and the upcoming V for Vendetta TV series.

== Early life ==
Purefoy was born 3 June 1964 in Taunton, Somerset, the eldest son of Anthony Chetwynd Purefoy and Shirley, née Taylor.

Purefoy boarded at Sherborne School, which he left with only one O-level. He later went to night school and received 11 more O-levels, before taking his A-levels at Brooklands College in Weybridge. He worked as a porter at Yeovil District Hospital before studying acting at the Central School of Speech and Drama.

Purefoy said that as a “young radical actor”, he had different politics to his father, who was a Tory and who worked for the Conservative Party; they had had “long interesting discussions” about politics.

== Career ==
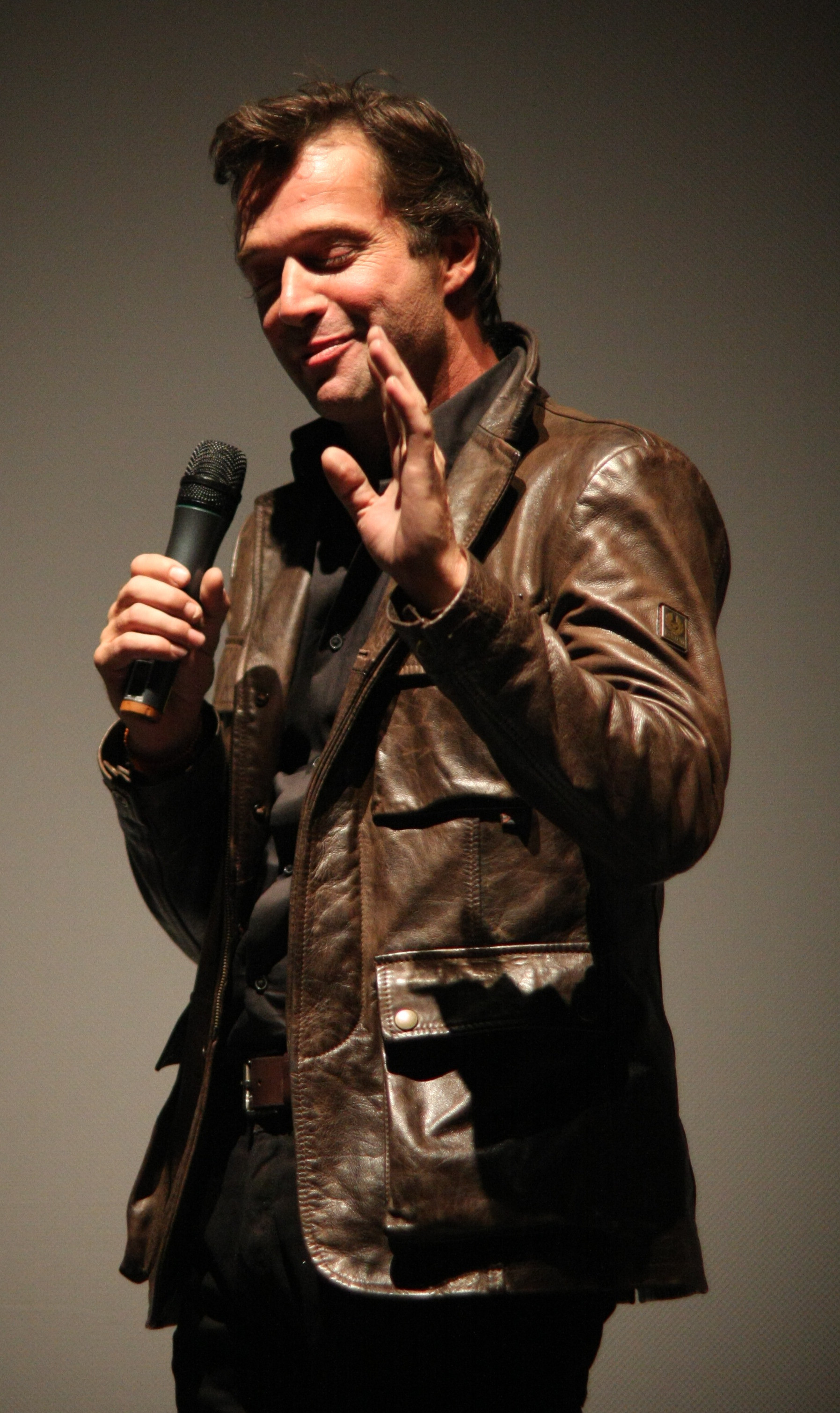
Purefoy in 2009

=== Stage work ===
Purefoy's early professional roles included Romeo in Romeo and Juliet in Leatherhead, Walter in Mary Morgan at the Riverside Studios and Alan Strang in Equus on tour. He subsequently joined the Royal Shakespeare Company (RSC) in 1988 and appeared in The Constant Couple, Macbeth, The Tempest, The Man Who Came to Dinner, (Gene Saks, Barbican) and King Lear as Edgar.

Elsewhere, he has also appeared as Laertes in Hamlet at the Bristol Old Vic (1991), Brian in William Gaminara's Back Up the Hearse and Let them Sniff the Flowers at the Hampstead Theatre (1992), Roland Maule in Noël Coward's Present Laughter at the Globe Theatre (1993), Biff in Death of a Salesman, alongside Ken Stott and Jude Law, at the West Yorkshire Playhouse in Leeds (1994), Tony in The Servant at the Birmingham Rep (1995). He returned to the RSC for Simon Callow's stage adaptation of the film classic, Les enfants du paradis at the Barbican. He also played Hugh de Morville in Paul Corcoran's Four Nights in Knaresborough at the Tricycle Theatre, (1999) and Loveless in Trevor Nunn's production of The Relapse at the National Theatre in 2001.

Between March and June 2011 he starred as Peter in Trevor Nunn's production of Flare Path at the Theatre Royal, Haymarket, alongside Sheridan Smith and Sienna Miller, as part of the playwright Terence Rattigan's centenary year celebrations.

He appeared as part of the ensemble cast of the 2019 West and Middle Chinnock Christmas Show, as well as singing several sea shanties from Fisherman's Friends.

=== Film and television ===
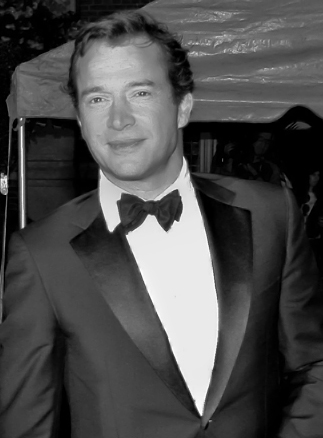
Purefoy at the Toronto International Film Festival in 2009.

In 1991, Purefoy played James McCarthy, a young man accused of murdering his father, in "The Boscombe Valley Mystery," in Granada's The Case-Book of Sherlock Holmes. Another of his notable roles was as Nicholas Jenkins in the four-part miniseries A Dance to the Music of Time for Channel 4 in 1997. He played Edward, the Black Prince in the film A Knight's Tale, Rawdon Crawley in Vanity Fair with Reese Witherspoon, and Tom Bertram in the 1999 production of Mansfield Park. He has played major roles in several television costume dramas, including Sharpe's Sword, The Tenant of Wildfell Hall, The Prince and the Pauper, The Mayor of Casterbridge, Blackbeard: Terror at Sea, Beau Brummell: This Charming Man, The Tide of Life, Camelot and Rome.

Purefoy was screen tested for the role of James Bond in 1995 for GoldenEye, but ultimately lost the role to Pierce Brosnan. Throughout 2004 and 2005 Purefoy's name was rumoured as a possible candidate to replace Brosnan as Bond in future films. Speculation suggested that his departure was due to an opportunity to play James Bond in the 2006 film Casino Royale. He was originally the actor for V in the 2006 film V for Vendetta but had creative differences with the production team and left the film six weeks into filming. Parts of the film contain (dubbed) scenes of Purefoy.

Purefoy played Mark Antony in the HBO/BBC original television series, Rome. At the time there were rumours that at least one nude body in the show had been digitally enhanced. When his Wikipedia entry, which at that time referred to the rumours, was brought up in an interview with Alastair McKay, published in the January 2007 issue of Out magazine, Purefoy said, "I won't say whose it was, but there was a penis in the series that may have been slightly enhanced. But it wasn't mine. Mine's all mine."

In 2007, producer William J. Macdonald announced that Purefoy would play Simon Templar in a new TV series of The Saint. The new series was scheduled to start shooting in Berlin and Australia in April 2008. However, production ultimately did not occur and in August Purefoy was reported as negotiating with NBC to star in another series, The Philanthropist. He starred as Teddy Rist in the summer television series, which aired on NBC beginning in June 2009. His character is a billionaire playboy who decides to use his wealth and power to help others in need.

In 2009 Purefoy played the titular character in an adaptation of Robert E. Howard's Solomon Kane. In 2013, The Following debuted, starring Purefoy as the lead antagonist of the series. He portrays Joe Carroll, a former professor who becomes a serial killer and leads a cult of followers, all of whom help create Carroll's "story".

It was announced in June 2014 that Purefoy would join the cast of the film High-Rise with Tom Hiddleston and Jeremy Irons. Later in 2014, Purefoy co-starred in the Formula 1-themed music video for David Guetta's song "Dangerous".

From 2016 to 2018 Purefoy starred as Hap Collins in Sundance's adaptation of Hap and Leonard, alongside Michael Kenneth Williams. In 2018 he starred as Laurens Bancroft in Altered Carbon, a Netflix original series. In February 2019, Hybrid (who provided the score to Interlude in Prague) released a short film to accompany their single "Hold Your Breath" from the album Light of the Fearless. The film starred Purefoy as the brooding "Mr Black".

In 2020, Purefoy joined the cast of the second season of the V for Vendetta and Gotham prequel television series Pennyworth in a main role, portraying Captain Gulliver "Gully" Troy, a former SAS captain and the leader of a crew of criminals consisting of former soldiers, who later becomes the enhanced super-soldier Captain Blighty in the 2022 third season.

He portrayed the father of the Mitford sisters, ‘Farve’, in the 2025 TV series Outrageous. He grew a moustache for the role.

== Personal life ==
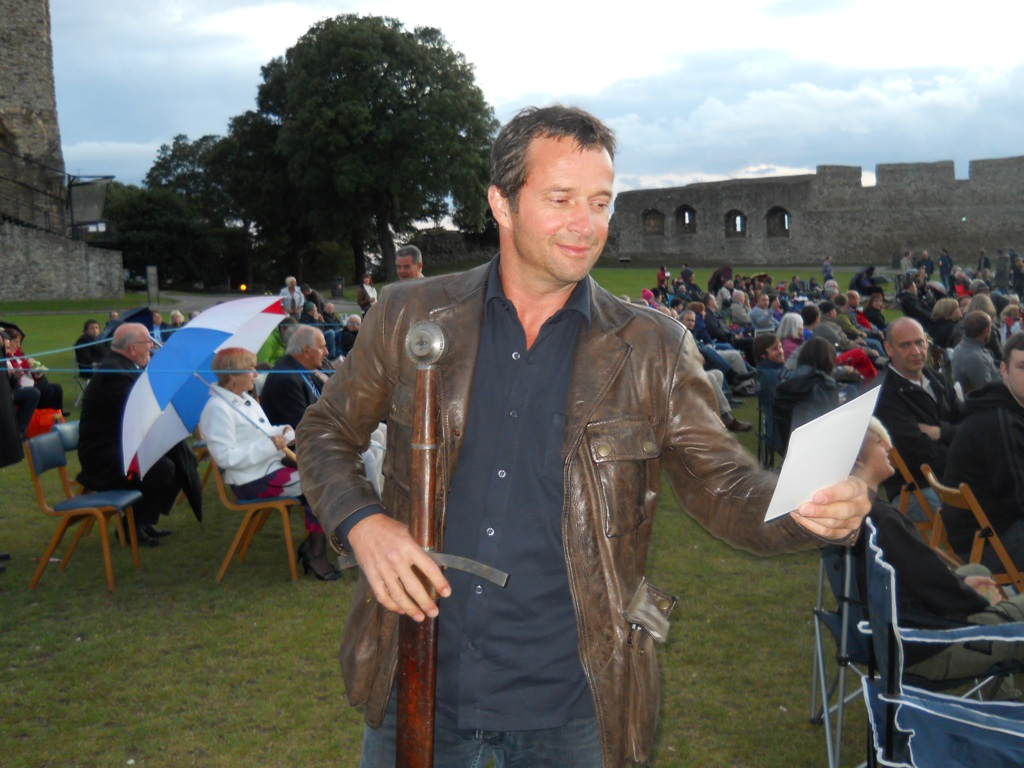
Purefoy in 2011 at Rochester Castle in Kent

Purefoy married actress Holly Aird in 1996, with whom he has a son. They divorced in 2002.

In 2014 he married art historian Jessica Adams with whom he has a daughter and two sons.

Purefoy is a supporter of both Yeovil Town and Manchester United.

== Filmography ==
=== Film ===
Year	Title	Role	Notes
1995	Feast of July	Jedd Wainwright	
1996	The Tide of Life	Nick Stuart	
1997	Jilting Joe	Joe	
1998	Bedrooms and Hallways	Brendan	
1999	Mansfield Park	Tom Bertram	
1999	Women Talking Dirty	Daniel	
2000	Lighthouse	Richard Spader	
2000	Maybe Baby	Carl Phipps	
2000	The Wedding Tackle	Hal	
2001	Tomorrow	Andrew Spender	
2001	A Knight's Tale	Edward, the Black Prince of Wales / Sir Thomas Colville	
2002	Resident Evil	Spence Parks	
2003	Photo Finish	James	Jury Award for Best Actor
2004	George and the Dragon	Saint George	
2004	Blessed	Craig Howard	
2004	Vanity Fair	Colonel Rawdon Crawley	
2005	V for Vendetta	V	Uncredited; left six weeks into filming; few opening scenes of a masked V are of James Purefoy but are dubbed by Hugo Weaving
2006	Goose on the Loose	Kenneth Donnelly	
2008	Lena: The Bride of Ice	Dr. Harper	
2009	Solomon Kane	Solomon Kane	
2011	Ironclad	Marshall	
2012	John Carter	Kantos Kan	
2013	Wicked Blood	Wild Bill	
2015	Momentum	Mr. Washington	
2015	High-Rise	Pangbourne	
2016	Equity	Michael Connor	
2017	Churchill	King George VI	
2017	Interlude in Prague	Baron Saloka	
2019	Fisherman's Friends	Jim	
2022	Fisherman's Friends: One and All	Jim	
2026	Masters of the Universe	King Randor	

=== Television ===
Year	Title	Role	Notes
1990	Coasting	Mike Baker	
1991	Sherlock Holmes	James McCarthy	Episode: "The Boscombe Valley Mystery"
1991	Boon	Alan Bridges	Episode: "Houseguests"
1992	The Cloning of Joanna May	Oliver	Television film
1992	Angels	Victor	
1993	Calling the Shots	Brian Summers	Television film
1993	Rides	Julian	4 episodes
1993	Crime Story	Darius Guppy	Episode: "The Prince"
1995	Tears Before Bedtime	Jimmy Turner	
1995	Sharpe's Sword	Captain Jack Spears	Television film
1996	The Tide of Life	Nick Stuart	Television miniseries
1996	The Tenant of Wildfell Hall	Mr Lawrence	Television miniseries
1996	The Prince and the Pauper	Miles Hendon	
1997	Have Your Cake and Eat It	Ben	Television miniseries
1997	Bright Hair	David Miles	Television film
1997	A Dance to the Music of Time	Nicholas Jenkins	Television miniseries
2000	Don Quixote	Sansón Carrasco	Television film
2000	Metropolis	Nathan	Miniseries
2001	Bye Bye Baby		Television film
2003	The Mayor of Casterbridge	Donald Farfrae	Television film
2005	Blackbeard	Edward Teach / Blackbeard	Television film
2005–07	Rome	Mark Antony	Lead role
2006	Beau Brummell: This Charming Man	Beau Brummell	Television film
2007	Manchild	Joe	Television film
2007	Frankenstein	Henry Clerval	Television film
2008–10	The Summit	Thom Lightstone	Miniseries
2009	Diamonds	Lucas Denmont	Television film
2009	The Philanthropist	Teddy Rist	
2011	Camelot	King Lot	Episodes: "Homecoming", "The Sword and the Crown", "Lady of the Lake"
2011	Injustice	William Travers	Miniseries
2011	Rev.	Richard	Episode: "#2.6"
2011	Revenge	Dominik Wright	Episodes: "Doubt", "Justice"
2012	The Hollow Crown	Thomas Mowbray	Episode: "Richard II"
2012	Episodes	Rob	4 episodes
2013–15	The Following	Joe Carroll	30 episodes
2016–18	Hap and Leonard	Hap Collins	
2016	Roots	John Waller	Miniseries
2016–18	Trollhunters: Tales of Arcadia	Kanjigar the Courageous (voice)	
2018	Altered Carbon	Laurens Bancroft	10 episodes
2018	Urban Myths	Billy Wilder	Episode: "Marilyn Monroe and Billy Wilder: "It's Me, Sugar""
2019–2020	Sex Education	Remi Milburn	5 episodes
2019	3Below: Tales of Arcadia	Kanjigar the Courageous (voice)	2 episodes
2020–2022	Pennyworth	Captain Gulliver "Gully" Troy / Captain Blighty	Main role; seasons 2–3
2020	El Candidato	Wayne Addison	10 episodes
2020	No Man's Land	Stanley	8 episodes
2021	A Discovery of Witches	Philippe de Clermont	
2022	Marie Antoinette	Louis XV	
2023	Malpractice	Dr. Leo Harris	
2023	Mr. Monk's Last Case: A Monk Movie	Rick Eden	Television film
2024	The Veil	Sir Michael Althorpe	
2025	The Recruit	Oliver Bonner-Jones	
2025	Outrageous	David Mitford	
2025	The Witcher	Stefan Skellen, Spy Master Advisor to Emhyr Var Emreis	Season 4
2025-2026	Saint-Pierre	Sean Gallagher	Main role; seasons 1-2
	Robin Hood	King Henry	Season 2 cast

=== Radio ===
Year	Title	Role	Notes
2002	Afternoon Play: The Tears of War	Bevil Quiller-Couch	BBC Radio 4
2014	Do Androids Dream of Electric Sheep?	Rick Deckard	BBC Radio 4
2016	Le Cid	Don Rodrigue	BBC Radio 3
2017	The Scarlet Pimpernel	Sir Percy Blakeney	BBC Radio 4
