= Hyenas: a Hap and Leonard Novella =

2011 novella by Joe R. Lansdale

- Subterranean Press trade cover
- Author: Joe R. Lansdale
- Cover artist: Glen Orbik
- Language: English
- Series: Hap and Leonard
- Genre: Crime/suspense
- Publisher: Subterranean Press
- Publication date: 2011
- Publication place: United States
- Media type: Print Limited hardcover, trade hardcover
- Pages: 100
- ISBN: 978-1-59606-355-6
- Preceded by: Devil Red (2011)
- Followed by: Dead Aim (2013)

Hyenas: a Hap and Leonard Novella is a novella written by American author Joe R. Lansdale. It is the tenth book in the Hap and Leonard series of works by Mr. Lansdale. It contains the novella Hyenas, and the short story "The Boy Who Became Invisible."

== Plot summary ==
In this book Leonard becomes involved in a ballroom brawl that ends up leading both Hap and Leonard to a local gang of bank robbers. Hap's girlfriend Brett ends up getting abducted by the gang so the two protagonists set out to rescue her and stop the robberies.

== Editions ==
This novella was published by Subterranean Press as both a signed limited edition (400 copies) and a trade hardcover. Both editions have sold out.
