= Mucho Mojo =

1994 novel by Joe R. Lansdale

- The Cemetery Dance Publications edition
- Author: Joe R. Lansdale
- Cover artist: Mark A. Nelson
- Language: English
- Series: Hap and Leonard
- Publisher: Mysterious Press, Cemetery Dance, Vintage Crime/Black Lizard
- Publication date: 1 August 1994
- Publication place: United States
- Media type: Print (Hardcover, Trade paperback)
- Pages: 308
- ISBN: 0-89296-490-1
- Preceded by: Savage Season (1990)
- Followed by: The Two-Bear Mambo (1995)

Mucho Mojo is a mystery/crime novel by American author Joe R. Lansdale. This is the second in Lansdale's Hap and Leonard series of crime novels.

== Plot summary ==
This story revolves around the death of Leonard Pine's Uncle Chester who happens to live next to a crack house. Under the floorboards of his uncle's house the two discover the skeleton of an infant wrapped in child pornography. Leonard refuses to believe his uncle could be involved so he enlists the help of his best friend, Hap Collins, to solve the murder and clear his uncle.

== Editions ==
This book was published as a limited edition by Cemetery Dance Publications and as a trade hardcover by Mysterious Press in 1994. Both are now out of print. A trade paperback was published by Vintage Crime/Black Lizard on Jan. 6, 2009.

Vintage Crime/Black Lizard cover

== Awards ==
Mucho Mojo was listed as a New York Times Notable Book of the Year and was awarded British Fantasy Award.
