= The Two-Bear Mambo =

1995 novel by Joe R. Lansdale

- Author: Joe R. Lansdale
- Cover artist: Dan Osyczka
- Language: English
- Series: Hap and Leonard
- Publisher: Mysterious Press
- Publication date: September 1995
- Publication place: United States
- Media type: Print (hardcover, trade paperback)
- Pages: 273
- ISBN: 0-89296-491-X
- Preceded by: Mucho Mojo (1994)
- Followed by: Bad Chili (1997)

The Two-Bear Mambo is a 1995 suspense/crime novel written by the American author Joe R. Lansdale, first published by the Mysterious Press. It is the third book in his Hap and Leonard series. It received generally positive reviews from critics, largely on the main characters, their friendship, and the dialogue and action.

== Plot summary ==
Hap's African American ex-girlfriend set out to attempt to recover the long lost tapes of a deceased bluesman in a Ku Klux Klan infested town in East Texas. After she goes missing, her current boyfriend enlists Hap and Leonard to find out what happened to her. Needless to say, they run into a lot of trouble. The town locals do not care and local law enforcement views it as a black-on-black crime not worthy of investigating. Hap, and especially Leonard, are viewed as outside meddlers who should go back to where they came from.

== Publication history ==
The third book in the Hap and Leonard series, The Two-Bear Mambo was originally published as a trade hardcover by Mysterious Press in September 1995. Its most recent publication was issued by Vintage Crime/Black Lizard as a trade paperback in May 2009.

== Reception ==
The Two-Bear Mambo received generally positive reviews. Critics noted its similarities to works in the vein of David Lynch, and he was initially planning to direct a movie adaptation of it, although the deal fell through. The two main characters, Hap and Leonard, were popular and generally considered to be one of the highlights of the novel. The humour, dialogue, and action were also well received. However, the Houston Chronicle writer Clay Reynolds considered much of the Mambo to be a case of wasted potential, feeling that it could have been "a brilliant book" with "a bit more work[,] thought, and effort", criticizing the cast of racist redneck villains for being unrealistic and underwhelming due to the openness of their bigotry, which undermined the realities of racism. The South Florida Sun-Sentinel's Chauncey Mabe wrote that, while still an enjoyable read, Mambo was unable to meet the heights of the genre. She considered some of these qualities, such as the plot that progresses largely by accident on the part of the main characters, to be unsatisfying in a way that was present in Lansdale's previous writing; the bigger issue, newer in Mambo, was that the extreme violence and racism on display from a town of white Texans was too overwhelmingly nasty to be funny or enjoyable to read, even when done by a villain. Reynolds also noted that, despite being marketed as "a novel of suspense", the mystery and the villain's motive were incredibly easy to determine. Although more negative, Mabe and Reynolds considered the novel to be good, though not great, largely on the merits of its characters and action.

An audiobook adaptation narrated by Phil Gigante received a starred review from Publishers Weekly in 2009.
