= Dead Aim (novella) =

2013 novella by Joe R. Lansdale

- Subterranean Press trade edition cover
- Author: Joe R. Lansdale
- Cover artist: Glen Orbik
- Language: English
- Series: Hap and Leonard
- Genre: Crime/suspense
- Publisher: Subterranean Press
- Publication date: 2013
- Publication place: United States
- Media type: Print Limited hardcover, trade hardcover
- Pages: 102
- ISBN: 978-1-59606-525-3
- Preceded by: Hyenas: a Hap and Leonard Novella (2011)

Dead Aim is a crime/suspense novella written by American author Joe R. Lansdale. It is the eleventh book in the Hap and Leonard series featuring Lansdale's longtime protagonists Hap Collins and Leonard Pine.

== Plot summary ==
Hap and Leonard are hired, through Marvin Hanson's private detective agency, to protect a woman from her estranged, abusive husband. Hap is framed for the man's murder while staking out his house, and upon further investigation, the two sleuths discover that the victim owed the Dixie Mafia crime syndicate a large sum of money, and in addition he had a large life insurance policy with his wife named as the sole beneficiary. Hap and Leonard are soon involved, not just in the murder, but in a kidnapping and ransom demand as well.

== Editions ==
This book is published by Subterranean Press and issued as a signed and numbered (400 copies) limited edition and as a trade hardcover. The trade edition has sold out.
