= Born for Trouble: The Further Adventures of Hap and Leonard =

Novella collection by Joe R. Lansdale

- Design by John Coulthart
- Author: Joe R. Lansdale
- Cover artist: John Coulthart
- Language: English
- Series: Hap and Leonard
- Genre: Mystery/suspense
- Publisher: Tachyon Publications
- Publication date: 2022
- Publication place: United States
- Media type: Print (trade paperback)
- ISBN: 978-1-61696-370-5

Born for Trouble: The Further Adventures of Hap and Leonard is a collection of five previously uncollected novellas by American author Joe R. Lansdale featuring his longtime protagonists Hap Collins and Leonard Pine.

== Contents ==
The collection features a short introduction by Lansdale entitled "The Boys."

- Coco Butternut
- Hoodoo Harry
- Sad Onions
- The Briar Patch Boogie
- Cold Cotton

== Critical reception ==
Publishers Weekly said the collection is "uneven" and pointed out several "low points" in the collection, including "the forgettable 'Sad Onions' [...] and the lamentable 'The Briar Patch Boogie.'" They concluded by noting, "Though high on action, adventure, and carnage, these tales are short on humor, characterization, and personal reflection. Hap and Leonard enthusiasts will hope for better next time."

Library Journal provided a more favorable review, saying the collection is "just as good and fresh as the first, offering high voltage action mixed with down-home humor."
