= Savage Season =

1990 crime novel by Joe R. Lansdale

- Mark V. Ziesing edition
- Author: Joe R. Lansdale
- Cover artist: Terry Lee
- Language: English
- Series: Hap and Leonard
- Publisher: Mark V. Ziesing, Vintage Crime/Black Lizard
- Publication date: 1990
- Publication place: United States
- Media type: Print (Hardcover, Trade paperback)
- Pages: 178
- ISBN: 0-929-480-22-8
- Followed by: Mucho Mojo

Savage Season is a 1990 crime novel by American author Joe R. Lansdale. It is the first in a series of books and stories written by Lansdale featuring the characters Hap Collins and Leonard Pine. The novel was nominated for a Bram Stoker Award for Best (Mystery) Novel of 1990.

== Plot synopsis ==
Hap and Leonard are two Texan men who are down on their luck, both working low paying jobs well into their 40s. Hap's ex-wife Trudy returns, involving the pair in a scheme to retrieve hundreds of thousands of dollars stolen from a bank and then lost in a creek in the woods in an area which Hap knows quite well. She is involved with a small group of radical leftists who wish to use the money to fund their movement; Hap and Leonard just wish to have enough to retire somewhere pleasant. Her return, as well as her continued involvement with various movements, awakens dormant emotions in Hap, leading him to wonder whether he should have devoted more time to the ideals he felt in the 1960s, and whether he had wasted his time in the interim on low-paying, go nowhere jobs. Once Hap finds the money, the leftists reveal the violent nature of their plans, and kidnap Hap and Leonard rather than pay them. The leftists are quickly betrayed when they attempt to buy guns from a local drug dealer named Soldier, which leads to a violent confrontation over the stolen money. In the end, Hap is left with conflicted emotions about the 1960s and his own part in them, regretting neither his former idealism nor his current cynicism.
