= Jim Nisbet =

American author (1947–2022)

- Born: January 20, 1947; Schenectady, New York, U.S.
- Died: September 28, 2022 (aged 75); Sausalito, California, U.S.
- Education: University of North Carolina at Chapel Hill
- Occupation: Author

Jim Nisbet (January 20, 1947 – September 28, 2022) was an American author.

== Biography ==
Nisbet received a degree in literature from the University of North Carolina at Chapel Hill before settling in San Francisco, California, where he wrote poetry, short stories, plays, and novels. He also ran a studio designing and building “electronics furniture”—consoles and cabinetry for audio and video production studios.

He was the author of 13 published novels and six books of poetry, and he contributed to many collections and journals. His work was published in the U.S., France (by Rivages, under legendary editor François Guérif), Germany, and Italy.

Nisbet's writing used the conventions of crime fiction and noir to support a dark, cerebral, and harrowing narrative, laced with humor and carried off in unexpected directions by exuberant wordplay. He incorporated themes as wide-ranging as sailing, particle physics, mathematics, ancient Rome, modern jazz, and urban subculture.

Jim Nisbet died in Sausalito, California, on September 28, 2022, at the age of 75.

== Novels ==
- The Gourmet (1981) AKA The Damned Don’t Die (1986)
- Lethal Injection (1987)
- Death Puppet (1989)
- Ulysses' Dog (1992) AKA The Spider's Cage (2014)
- The Price of the Ticket (1997)
- Prelude to a Scream (1997)
- Dark Companion (2004)
- The Syracuse Codex (2004)
- The Octopus on My Head (2007)
- Windward Passage (2010)
- A Moment of Doubt (2010)
- Old & Cold (2012)
- Snitch World (2013)

== Poetry ==
- Poems for a Lady (1997)
- Gnachos for Bishop Berkeley (1980)
- Morpho (1983)
- Small Apt (1992)
- Across the Tasman Sea (1997)
- Sonnets (2014)

== Other works ==
- Laminating the Conic Frustum (1991)
