= The Android and the Human =

1972 speech given by Philip K. Dick

"The Android and the Human" is a speech given by science-fiction author Philip K. Dick at the Vancouver Science Fiction Convention, taking place at the University of British Columbia in March of 1972. It was subsequently published in the fanzine SF Commentary, issue 31. In it the author examines the psychology of humanity as seen through the lens of technology, and vice versa.

Dick compares the way that modern technology is animated by mechanism or computation with the way that, according to sociology, primitive man imagines reality itself to be "alive": Rocks, clouds, and the rest of his environment seeming full of hidden motivation, often replete with malice or benevolence.

As man advances, intellectually, he comes to the point where he questions that magical world of superstition, coming to only see life where it actually is, scientifically. In fact he can become solipsist about whether there is any life outside of his own thoughts: Cogito, ergo sum.

But with modern automation, people can be drawn back into the intellectually primitive world of animism, where life appears to be in places sound reason says it is not. This was apparent even in 1972, years before technologies such as virtual assistants and large language models.

What's more, that technological illusion of life is being created by human beings, who therefore project their own biases and views onto it, so that this impression of animism is a mirror held up to humanity itself:

Our environment — and I mean our man-made world of machines, artificial constructs, computers, electronic systems, interlinking homeostatic components — all of this is in fact beginning more and more to possess what the earnest psychologists fear the primitive sees in his environment: animation. In a very real sense our environment is becoming alive, or at least quasi-alive, and in ways specifically and fundamentally analogous to ourselves...Rather than learning about ourselves by studying our constructs, perhaps we should make the attempt to comprehend what our constructs are up to by looking into what we ourselves are up to

Dick analogizes this to androids, describing such a device as "a thing somehow generated to deceive us in a cruel way, to cause us to think it to be one of ourselves".

In fact, Dick even claims that a person who lacks the ethics, empathy, and sincerity that are seen as defining humanity can be considered an android: "a metaphor for people who are physiologically human but psychologically behaving in a non-human way."

Among the androids of modern society, Dick addresses the unethical behavior of the police state, giving examples of what would someday be called the surveillance society. One such being the way checkpoints justified to prevent mass shootings in libraries had almost immediately come to be used as a means of generating false probable cause to search people for drugs.

Contrasted with this is the hope that Philip holds for the youth who are used to the police state, and yet resisting it via civil disobedience.
