= John Shirley =

American novelist (born 1953)

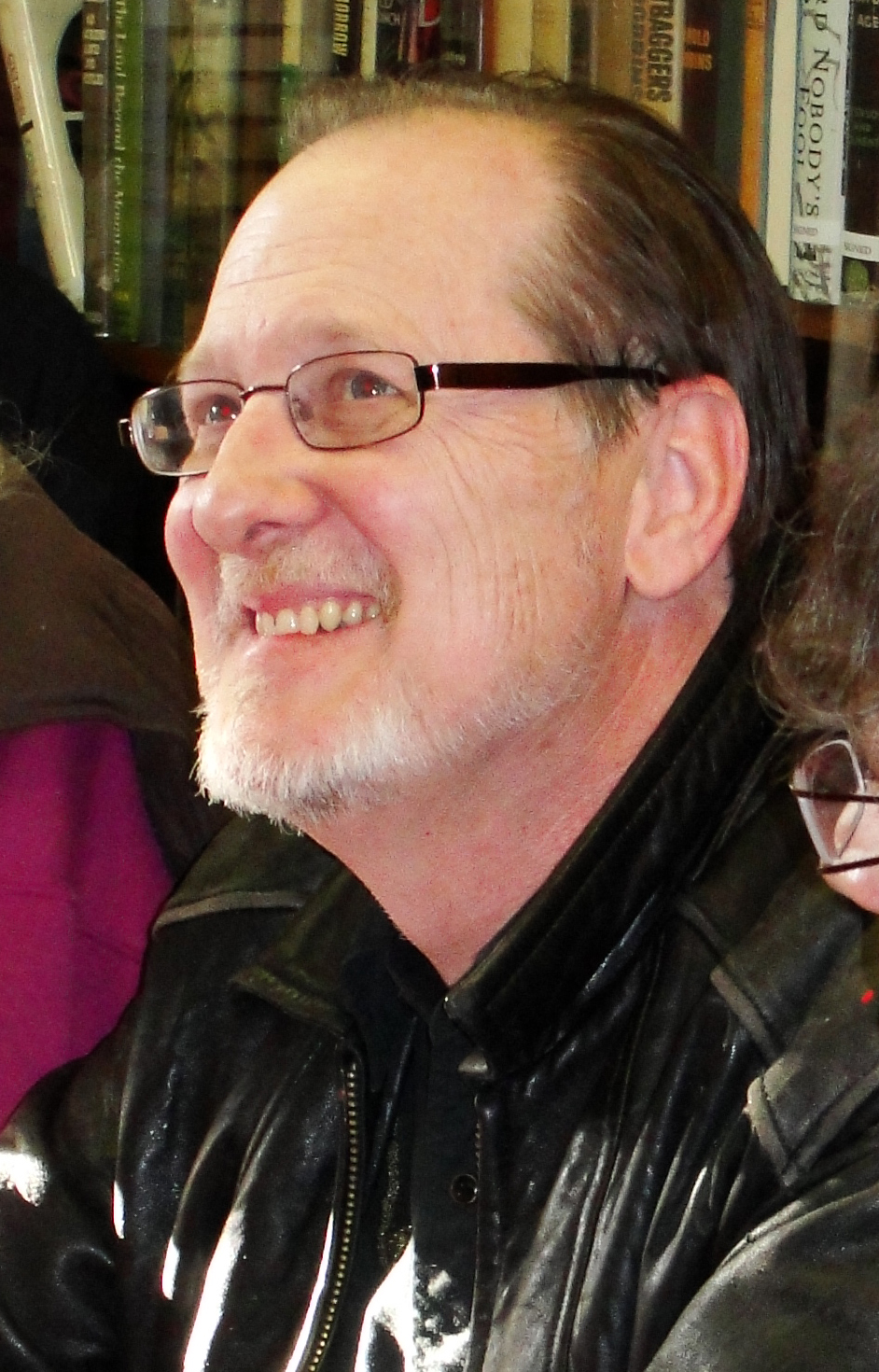
- Born: February 10, 1953 (age 73); Houston, Texas, U.S.
- Occupations: Novelist; short story writer; screenwriter; songwriter
- Spouse: Micky Shirley
- Children: 3

John Shirley (born February 10, 1953) is an American novelist, short story writer, screenwriter, and songwriter whose work includes science fiction and horror. He is associated with the early development of cyberpunk; his 1980 novel City Come A-Walkin' predates many of the works commonly associated with the genre, and William Gibson described Shirley as "cyberpunk's Patient Zero" in an introduction to a later edition of the novel. His fiction also includes the A Song Called Youth trilogy and the story collection Black Butterflies.

Shirley co-wrote the screenplay for the 1994 film The Crow with David J. Schow, and has written lyrics for Blue Öyster Cult. Black Butterflies won the 1998 Bram Stoker Award for Fiction Collection, and his novel Gunmetal Mountain won the 2024 Spur Award for Original Mass-Market Paperback Novel.

== Biography ==
Shirley was born in Houston, Texas, on February 10, 1953, to John Edward and Ruth Shirley. His family moved between Texas, California, and Oregon during his childhood. Shirley has said that his father died of meningitis when he was ten years old.

Shirley has three sons. He lives in Vancouver, Washington, with his wife, Micky Shirley.

== Career ==
Shirley's early work included science fiction and horror, with novels such as City Come A-Walkin' (1980) and the A Song Called Youth trilogy: Eclipse (1985), Eclipse Penumbra (1988), and Eclipse Corona (1990). He became associated with the emerging cyberpunk movement. In The Routledge Companion to Cyberpunk Culture, Graham J. Murphy places Shirley with William Gibson, Bruce Sterling, Lewis Shiner, and Rudy Rucker in the "original Movement-era cadre" represented in Sterling's anthology Mirrorshades. In the foreword to the 1996 edition of City Come A-Walkin', Gibson called Shirley "cyberpunk's patient zero" and wrote that much of his own early work had taken off from the novel. Shirley and Gibson also collaborated on the short story "The Belonging Kind", later collected in Gibson's Burning Chrome. Shirley's "Freezone" appeared in Sterling's 1986 anthology Mirrorshades.

His work during the same period ranged beyond cyberpunk. A Splendid Chaos (1988) was an interplanetary novel, while Silicon Embrace (1996) combined science fiction with UFO, conspiracy, and religious imagery. His early short-story collections included Heatseeker, New Noir, and The Exploded Heart. Black Glass, published in 2008, returned to cyberpunk, while Bleak History (2009) was an urban-fantasy novel set in a near-future New York City.

Shirley also wrote extensively in horror. His novels include Dracula in Love, Cellars, Wetbones, Demons, and Crawlers. He has associated his early horror with the more extreme approach later known as splatterpunk, citing Dracula in Love, Cellars, and In Darkness Waiting among the works in which he pushed against contemporary genre limits. His 1998 collection Black Butterflies: A Flock on the Dark Side contains sixteen stories divided between broadly realistic horror and supernatural horror, dark fantasy, and science fiction. It won the 1998 Bram Stoker Award for Fiction Collection and the International Horror Guild Award.

Later collections included Really, Really, Really, Really Weird Stories (1999), Living Shadows (2007), and In Extremis: The Most Extreme Short Stories of John Shirley (2011). Reviewing Living Shadows in The New York Times in 2008, Terrence Rafferty described a recurring concern in Shirley's fiction with people's ability to become accustomed to pain and suffering. A Publishers Weekly review of the original Demons novella similarly noted denial and habituation in its account of humanity's response to the story's supernatural attacks.

Shirley has also worked in film and television. He wrote four early drafts of the screenplay for The Crow, adapted from James O'Barr's comic; David J. Schow later revised the screenplay, and both received screenplay credit on the finished film. His television work includes the teleplay for the Star Trek: Deep Space Nine episode "Visionary". He was also one of the credited writers on the Teenage Mutant Ninja Turtles episode "The Manhattan Project", which was nominated for the 2014 Primetime Emmy Award for Outstanding Animated Program.

From the 2000s onward, Shirley wrote a number of novelizations and media tie-ins. These included the novelization of Constantine, Aliens: Steel Egg (2007), novels based on Borderlands, BioShock: Rapture (2011), a prequel to the video-game series, and Halo: Broken Circle (2014), which concerns the early history and formation of the Covenant. He also wrote the novelization of Resident Evil: Retribution (2012).

Shirley continued to publish original fiction alongside the tie-in work. Everything Is Broken (2012) follows the aftermath of a natural disaster in a California town whose public services have been privatized. New Taboos (2013), part of PM Press's Outspoken Authors series, combines a novella, essays, and an interview. Doyle After Death (2013) is a supernatural mystery featuring Arthur Conan Doyle in the afterlife. His historical novel Wyatt in Wichita, about a young Wyatt Earp, was published in 2014. He later co-wrote A Dying Machine with musician Mark Tremonti, based on the story developed for Tremonti's 2018 concept album of the same name. A Sorcerer of Atlantis, a fantasy novel, followed in 2021.

Stormland (2021) is a dystopian science-fiction novel set in a late-21st-century United States affected by climate change, and SubOrbital 7 (2023) is a near-future science-fiction thriller. Shirley has also written Western fiction, including Axle Bust Creek (2022) and Gunmetal Mountain (2023). Gunmetal Mountain won a 2024 Spur Award.

Alongside his fiction and screenwriting, Shirley has worked as a musician and lyricist. He has performed with punk and rock bands and written lyrics for Blue Öyster Cult, including material for Heaven Forbid and Curse of the Hidden Mirror. His recordings from 1978 through 2012 were collected on the double album Broken Mirror Glass: The Anthology 1978–2012, issued in 2013.

== Awards ==
- Bram Stoker Awards – for horror works, voted by Horror Writers Association professional membership (2 nominations; 1 win)
  - 1998: "What Would You Do for Love?" (Black Butterflies: A Flock on the Dark Side) – long fiction – nomination
  - 1998: Black Butterflies: A Flock on the Dark Side (Mark V. Ziesing) – fiction collection – winner
- Locus Awards – for science fiction, fantasy, and horror works, polled by readers of Locus (5 nominations)
  - 1981: City Come A-Walkin' (Dell) – science fiction novel – 24th place
  - 1989: In Darkness Waiting (NAL Onyx) – horror novel – 13th place
  - 1990: Heatseeker (Scream/Press) – collection – 10th place
  - 1999: Black Butterflies: A Flock on the Dark Side (Mark V. Ziesing) – collection – 22nd place
  - 2000: Really, Really, Really, Really Weird Stories (Night Shade Books) – collection – 17th place
- International Horror Guild Awards – for horror works, juried (6 nominations; 2 wins)
  - 1998: "Cram" (Wetbones #2) – short story – winner
  - 1999: Black Butterflies: A Flock on the Dark Side (Mark V. Ziesing) – collection – winner
  - 1999: "What Would You Do for Love?" (Black Butterflies: A Flock on the Dark Side) – long fiction – nomination
  - 2001: Demons (Cemetery Dance) – long story – nomination
  - 2002: "Her Hunger" (Night Visions 10) – long fiction – nomination
  - 2004: Crawlers (Del Rey) – novel – nomination
- Interzone Readers Poll – for stories published in Interzone, polled by readers (1 nomination)
  - 2014: "The Kindest Man in Stormland" (Interzone #249) – story – 8th place
- Spur Award
  - 2024: Gunmetal Mountain (Pinnacle Books/Kensington Publishing) – winner

== Bibliography ==
=== Novels ===
- Transmaniacon (1979)
- Dracula in Love (1979)
- City Come A-Walkin' (1980)
- Three-Ring Psychus (1980)
- The Brigade (1981)
- Cellars (1982)
- Several books in the Traveler series of post-apocalyptic men's adventure novels (as D. B. Drumm)
- Several books in the Specialist series of mercenary/adventure men's adventure novels (as John Cutter)
- A Song Called Youth series (also known as the Eclipse Trilogy):
  - Eclipse (1985)
  - Eclipse Penumbra (1988)
  - Eclipse Corona (1990)
- In Darkness Waiting (1988)
- Kamus of Kadizhar: The Black Hole of Carcosa (1988)
- A Splendid Chaos (1988)
- Wetbones (1991). A supernatural serial killer novel featuring creatures called the Akishra who take over human minds and bodies.
- Silicon Embrace (1996)
- Demons (2000, novella)
- ...And the Angel with Television Eyes (2001, novella)
- The View from Hell (2001, novella)
- Her Hunger (2001, novella)
- Spider Moon (2002)
- Demons (2002), an expanded edition including the sequel novella Undercurrents
- Crawlers (2003)
- Doom (2005, novelization of the film)
- Constantine (2005, novelization of the film)
- John Constantine: Hellblazer: War Lord (2006)
- Predator: Forever Midnight (2006)
- Batman: Dead White (2006)
- John Constantine: Hellblazer: Subterranean (2006)
- The Other End (2007)
- Aliens: Steel Egg (2007)
- Black Glass (2008)
- Bleak History (2009)
- BioShock: Rapture (2011)
- Borderlands: The Fallen (2011)
- Everything Is Broken (2012)
- Borderlands: Unconquered (2012)
- Resident Evil: Retribution (2012, novelization of the film)
- Doyle After Death (2013)
- Borderlands: Gunsight (2013)
- Grimm: The Icy Touch (2013)
- Wyatt in Wichita (2014)
- Watch Dogs: Dark Clouds (2014)
- Halo: Broken Circle (2014)
- A Dying Machine (2018), with Mark Tremonti
- Ralph Compton Broken Rider (2020)
- Stormland (2021), a science-fiction climate-change thriller
- A Sorcerer of Atlantis (2021), published together with the novella "A Prince in the Kingdom of Ghosts"

=== Short fiction ===
Collections

- Heatseeker (1989)
- New Noir (1993)
- The Exploded Heart (1996)
- Black Butterflies (1998) (winner of the Bram Stoker Award)
- Really, Really, Really, Really Weird Stories (1999)
- Darkness Divided (2001)
- Living Shadows (2007)
- In Extremis: The Most Extreme Short Stories of John Shirley (2011)
- The Feverish Stars (2021)

=== Nonfiction ===
- Gurdjieff: An Introduction to His Life and Ideas (2004) ISBN 1-58542-287-8

== Selected film and television writing credits ==
The following are selected film and television writing credits.

=== Television ===
- Defenders of the Earth (1986)
- The Real Ghostbusters (1987)
- BraveStarr (1987–1988)
- RoboCop (1988)
- Star Trek: Deep Space Nine (1995)
- VR.5 (1995)
- Red Shoe Diaries (1996)
- Poltergeist: The Legacy (1996)
- The Adventures of Sinbad (1996)
- Todd McFarlane's Spawn (1998)
- The Night of the Headless Horseman (1999)
- Batman Beyond (2000)
- Profit (2002)
- Iron Man: Armored Adventures (2012)
- Teenage Mutant Ninja Turtles (2014–2016)

=== Films ===
- The Crow (1994)
- Twists of Terror (1997)
- The Crow (2024) (additional literary material)

== Music ==
Shirley has had a long association with Blue Öyster Cult as a lyricist. He contributed lyrics to eight tracks on Heaven Forbid (1998) and eight on Curse of the Hidden Mirror (2001). He had earlier contributed lyrics to "Demon's Kiss" and "The Horsemen Arrive" for the soundtrack to Bad Channels.

Shirley also contributed lyrics to five songs on Blue Öyster Cult's 2020 album The Symbol Remains: "That Was Me", "Box in My Head", "Nightmare Epiphany", "Florida Man", and "Secret Road".

Shirley has said that Blue Öyster Cult's 1972 song "Transmaniacon MC" inspired the title and conception of his first published novel, Transmaniacon.

Shirley also performs with the Portland-based rock band The Screaming Geezers.

== See also ==
- List of horror fiction authors
- Splatterpunk
