= Vintage Crime/Black Lizard =

- Parent company: Vintage Books
- Founded: June 1990
- Country of origin: United States
- Headquarters location: New York City
- Publication types: Books
- Fiction genres: Mystery
- Official website: www.weeklylizard.com

Vintage Crime/Black Lizard is the corporate amalgamation of Random House's Vintage Crime, and Random House's 1990 acquisition, Black Lizard, a major publisher of classic crime fiction.

== History ==
Vintage Crime/Black Lizard was founded in June 1990 after Random House's acquisition of Black Lizard, the publishing company created by Donald S. Ellis and Barry Gifford. Before the acquisition Vintage Books was publishing the work of American mystery-authors such as Dashiell Hammett, James M. Cain and Raymond Chandler under Vintage Crime. As a result of the unification Random House came into the possession of the literature of Jim Thompson, and David Goodis, along with that of many other noir writers. Vintage Crime/Black Lizard is one of the preeminent publishers of crime fiction in the United States and asserts that it remains devoted to the best of "classic crime", having added Eric Ambler, Chester Himes and Ross Macdonald to their list of authors.

== Recent Publications ==
A list of contemporary authors published by this division of Vintage Books includes Henning Mankell, Lisa Unger, Stella Rimington, Carl Hiaasen, Michael Harvey, Ruth Rendell, April Smith, Joe R. Lansdale, and Andrew Vachss.
