= Panta Rhei =

Panta Rei or Panta Rhei may refer to:

- Panta rhei (doctrine), "everything flows", a concept in the philosophy of Heraclitus

== Media ==
- Panta Rhei (band), a Hungarian rock band
- Panta Rei (Đorđe Balašević album), a studio album by Đorđe Balašević
- Panta Rei (Jelena Tomašević album), the debut album of Jelena Tomašević
- Panta Rhei (film), a 1952 film by Bert Haanstra
- Panta Rei (film), a 2005 film by Nisvet Hrustić
- "Panta Rhei", a trance single (mixed by Armin van Buuren and Mark Sixma) featured A State of Trance 2015
- "Panta Rei", song by Agoria (musician) from "Impermanence" album
- "Panta Rhei", song by Myth & Roid
- "Panta Rhei", song #8 on Aephanemer’s third studio album A Dream of Wilderness
- Panta Rhei, cycle of performance art by VestAndPage

== Other ==
- Panta Rei, a fictional secret society featured in Umberto Eco's novel Foucault's Pendulum
- Panta Rhei, a ship operated by Zürichsee-Schifffahrtsgesellschaft on Lake Zurich in Switzerland
- Panta Rhei, a video game engine built by Capcom
- Panta Rhei, the name of the Scientific Decade 2013–2022 of the International Association of Hydrological Sciences
- Panta Rei (Bar), a friday bar at the department of Philosophy and History of ideas at Aarhus University
- The saying appears in Greek in the logo of the Society of Rheology

== See also ==
- Hōjōki – Japanese
- Impermanence – Buddhism
- Omnia mutantur, Tempora mutantur – Latin
