= Invisible Empire =

Invisible Empire may refer to:

- Invisible Empire (album), a 2003 album by Reef the Lost Cauze
- "Invisible Empire (song)", a song by KT Tunstall
- "Invisible Empire", a song by No Remorse
- Invisible Empire // Crescent Moon, a 2013 album by KT Tunstall
- Invisible Empires, a 2011 album by Sara Groves
- Agent 13: The Invisible Empire, first of the Agent 13: The Midnight Avenger series
- Ku Klux Klan, occasionally referred to as the "Invisible Empire" or "Invisible Empire of the South"
  - The Invisible Empire: The Ku Klux Klan in Florida, a book by Michael Newton
