= The Ku Klux Klan: An Encyclopedia =

1991 book by Michael and Judy Ann Newton

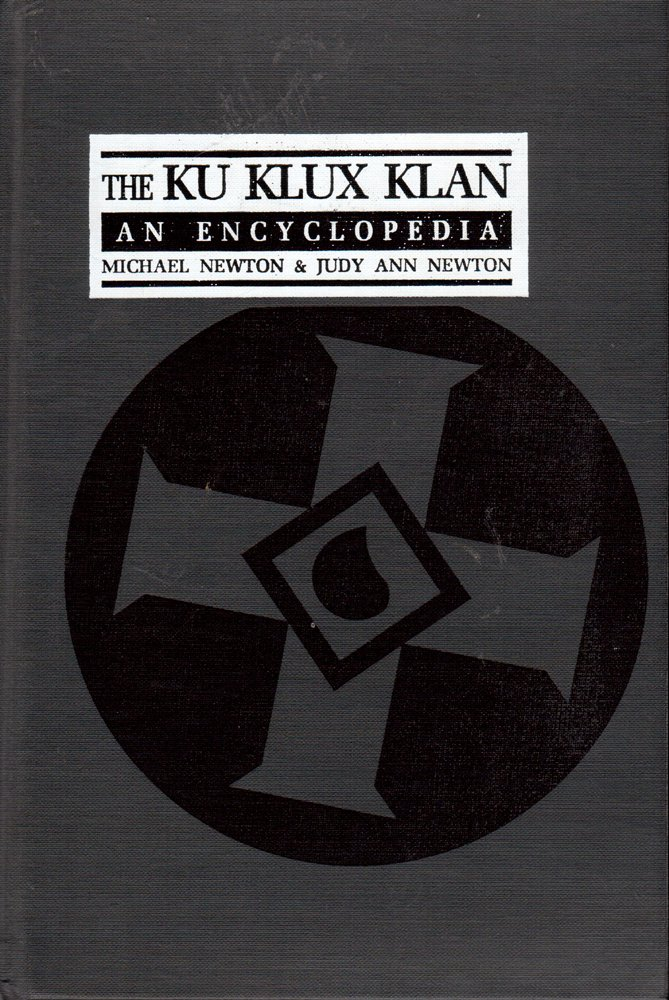
- Cover of the first edition
- Author: Michael Newton; Judy Ann Newton (only 1991 edition)
- Language: English
- Series: Garland Reference Library of Social Science
- Subject: Ku Klux Klan
- Published: 1991 (Garland Publishing); 2007 (McFarland & Company)
- Publication place: United States
- Media type: Print (Hardcover)
- Pages: 639
- ISBN: 0-8240-2038-3
- OCLC: 22381950
- Dewey Decimal: 322.4
- LC Class: HS2330.K63 N49 1991

The Ku Klux Klan: An Encyclopedia, later re-released as The Ku Klux Klan: History, Organization, Language, Influence and Activities of America's Most Notorious Secret Society, is a reference work written by Michael Newton and Judy Ann Newton. The encyclopedia was first published by Garland Publishing in 1991 as part of their Garland Reference Library of Social Sciences series. An expanded and reorganized edition was published in 2007 by McFarland & Company, this time with only Michael Newton credited.

It focuses on a wide range of topics related to the Ku Klux Klan, described by the authors as "the world's oldest, most persistent terrorist organization". Klansmen, Klan victims, and anti-Klan people and organizations are included, as well as a list of KKK jargon and related topics. Also covered are far-righters with little connection to the Klan. The book especially focuses on the KKK outside of the South, and on crimes committed by the Klan. Entries vary widely in length from a single sentence to over a page. In the first edition, the entries are listed alphabetically without separation, though the second reorganized edition divides entries into multiple sections based on topic.

Reviews for the 1991 edition were mixed to positive, with praise for much of its content and use as a reference on the Klan but criticisms for an abundance of shorter entries, its organizational structure, and a reliance on mostly popular media as sources. Several reviewers criticized the lack of an index in the first edition and lack of see also sections in the entries. The revised and reorganized 2007 edition received more positive reviews and was seen as an improvement on the original, though many reviewers again critiqued its organizational structure.

== Background and publication history ==
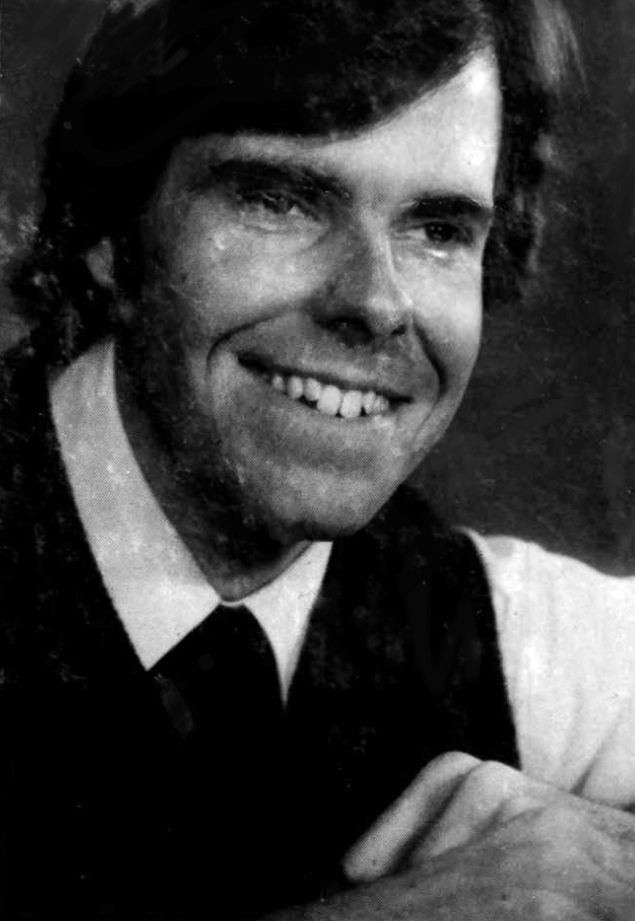
Author Michael Newton in 1979

The Ku Klux Klan: An Encyclopedia was authored by Michael Newton and Judy Ann Newton. At the time of the book's publication, they were married. Together they had written several books, mostly reference encyclopedias on crime topics. Michael Newton had written several other crime encyclopedias and reference works. He had a lifelong interest in the Ku Klux Klan, a white supremacist secret society, and had researched it for several years. He later published several other books on the Klan. Information is largely sourced from popular and media accounts like magazines, books, and newspapers, particularly The New York Times.

The Ku Klux Klan: An Encyclopedia was first published by Garland Publishing in 1991. It was part of Garland's Garland Reference Library of Social Sciences series, of which it was the 499th volume. This edition is 639 pages long. The cover of the first edition displays a Klan insignia. In 2007, the book was republished in a revised and expanded edition with new elements by McFarland & Company, under the title The Ku Klux Klan: History, Organization, Language, Influence and Activities of America's Most Notorious Secret Society. (Note: The 2007 edition does not acknowledge it is a revision of the 1991 encyclopedia, though it contains the content in the 1991 encyclopedia. Several reviews refer to it as a revision of the 1991 encyclopedia, but Gilson refers to it as a separate book.) For this edition, Michael Newton was the only author credited. (Note: Michael and Judy Ann Newton divorced between the publication of the 1991 and 2007 editions.) The 2007 edition was 504 pages long. The revised 2007 edition was reprinted in 2014 by McFarland. The 2014 edition was 512 pages.

== Contents ==
=== First edition (1991) ===
In a preface, Michael and Judy Ann Newton give an overview of the history of the Ku Klux Klan, describing it as "the world's oldest, most persistent terrorist organization". The book covers the Klan, primarily focusing on its rise following the American Civil War and its rise again during the civil rights movement. It covers the KKK throughout its history, from its origins to the second Reconstruction era Klan to the then-present day. Most content is on the 20th-century Klan. The encyclopedia contains black-and-white photos, featured chronologically in the book's center. The book's entries are, at the start of the book, given in four lists: "General List", "Geographic List", "Organizational List", and "List of People". The four lists substitute for an index, which the book lacks. The entries are then listed in alphabetical order. They vary in length, but many entries are short. Each entry contains at least one citation. The general list contains encyclopedic entries on historical events, ethnic groups targeted by the Klan, Klan history and events, materials related to the Klan (e.g., films or literature) and Klan beliefs and terminology, including a list of the Klan's specialized jargon.

The geographical list contains entries that trace the KKK's history in specific states, cities, towns, and seven other countries outside of the United States. The book especially focuses on the KKK outside of the South, and on crime topics. The only states not included are Washington and Hawaii. The organizational list enumerates Klan groups but also anti-Klan organizations and government agencies that oppose them. Also included are other groups that had some historical tie to the KKK. The final list, the biographical list, includes Klansmen, their allies and associates, law-enforcement, and politicians who were pro- or anti-Klan (though these are not separated or indicated), those individuals who have opposed them, and the victims of the Klan. Entries do not include birth or death dates. The book's sources are listed in a bibliography at the end.

=== Revised edition (2007) ===
Compared to the 1991 encyclopedia, the 2007 revised and reorganized edition (under the title The Ku Klux Klan: History, Organization, Language, Influence and Activities of America's Most Notorious Secret Society) contains additional elements, an index, an expanded bibliography, and additional illustrations. It additionally contains a list of abbreviations, and two appendixes containing Klan documents and a timeline. This edition has 11 chapters, and over 1,200 entries. In an introduction, Michael Newton again notes the KKK as America's first terror group.

Every chapter has its own table of contents. The entries vary widely in length, from as short as one sentence to over a page. This edition is organized in a different manner from the first, though the book includes some similar categorizations, including the group listings and terminology guide. In this edition the individual entries no longer refer to sources. The chapters include "Klanspeak", "The Klan Kreed", "Who's Who in the Invisible Empire" (biographies of Klansmen), "Komrades in Arms" (non-Klan far-righters, some of whom are Klan allies but others with little or no tie to the Klan), "Mapping the Klan" (location entries), "Friends and Foes of the Klan in Politics", "Reign of Terror" (crimes committed by the Klan), and "Covering the Klan". Each chapter's entries are listed alphabetically. This edition contains a bibliography and index, this time including primary sources.

== Reception ==
=== Reception to the first edition ===
The Ku Klux Klan: An Encyclopedia received mixed to positive reviews. Historian David Mark Chalmers called it a "highly useful reference work", and Norbert Finzsch said it was "the best reference tool for the KKK". Paul A. Cimbala for The Georgia Historical Quarterly called it a useful resource on a "bewildering array" of racist groups and called the book an accomplishment for the authors. Cimbala praised its comprehensive coverage of Klan terminology; he noted that "no longer will innocents confuse Kleagles, Kligrapps, Klokans, Klokards, and Kludds with exotic Star Trek characters."

Timothy Christien, for the Library Journal, criticized the detail as trivia; while he praised the author's goal as worthy, he said it would have narrow appeal. Kathleen M. Blee praised its comprehensiveness and complimented it as "an important public service and an excellent guide for research on hate groups", while M. Stark for Choice magazine called it "useful" though not "essential". British historian Hugh Brogan called it "truly useful" and factually accurate to his awareness; he said that "anyone who has occasion to write or talk about the Klan will be well advised to look things up in this volume", but bemoaned the approach the book took to covering the material, which he said was an "opportunity lost". William D. Jenkins for the Annals of Iowa was critical, calling it "unexceptional" and with many short entries. John P. Stierman gave a mixed review, saying the book's entries only contained more basic information; similarly, Doug Rippey for RQ said it "contains a great deal of well-documented information but omits significant facts in many articles", though was more positive in his assessment of the work, recommending it with cautions.

The use of mostly popular sourcing received a mixed reception. Harold W. Osborne for the Journal of Church and State said it was a difficult work to review because it was "obviously incomplete" given that the book was reliant on published material and the Ku Klux Klan was a secret society. Osborne also wondered how objective some of the sources the book drew on were, given they were largely media accounts. Nevertheless, he praised it as "a welcome contribution to the knowledge about this strange and unusual organization", and particularly complimented the preface as a good overview of the Klan's history. Cimbala said any encyclopedia on such a topic "risks obscuring the fact that such groups are the expression, not the cause, of a kind of violence that would exist with or without Klancraft and Imperial Wizards". Osborne said the book's evidence of the KKK's "propensity for hatred and violence" was perhaps the major contribution of the encyclopedia. Brogan noted its focus on crime topics, which he connected to other works from Newton.

The book's organizational structure, lacking an index in lieu of several lists at the start of the book, was criticized by several reviewers. Brogan said the lack of an index made it "impossible to use the book systematically". Some reviews also wished it had included see also sections in the individual entries to help navigate. Rippey and Stark said serious researchers would need to use the book in combination with other bibliographies of the Klan. Rippey said the only really similar work in terms of scope was Hooded Americanism: The History of the Ku Klux Klan by David Chalmers but said that book was formatted in a very different way. Rippey said the book was useful and factually accurate, but said there were many omissions he found strange. He noted that the Klan logo on the book's cover was itself not explained. While he called it a fitting reference work, Cimbala also noted the book was not without flaws, particularly for non-specialists, given he said the book was descriptive rather than explanatory. He criticized its inclusion or some shorter entries, saying the space could have been better utilized on larger entries on more significant subjects.

=== Reception to the revised edition ===
The Ku Klux Klan: History, Organization, Language, Influence and Activities of America's Most Notorious Secret Society was positively compared to the first edition and received largely positive reviews. M. Stark for Choice magazine recommended it and said it was an improvement on the first, with unique information and able to be used as its own resource rather than in conjunction with other sources. Reviewing the 2007 edition, Diane Fulkerson for the Library Journal praised the amount of detail provided and recommended it. She called it especially worthwhile for those studying racism, terrorism, or criminal justice. She also praised its bibliography for its extensiveness. Brian D. Singleton for Reference and User Services Quarterly recommended it and praised its writing and research. He said its scope as a reference book was unique for specifically focusing on the Ku Klux Klan rather than hate groups broadly. Tom Gilson for Against the Grain recommended the work and praised it as a "thoroughly researched and highly detailed" work that presents "a tremendous amount of information from diverse perspectives while advancing a distinct and revealing picture that is both fascinating and abhorrent".

Charles Becker for Booklist was mixed in his opinion of the book, noting a subjective tone and said the entries "are descriptively detailed but not analytical", but said it was well written. Becker criticized its tone, saying it was questionable as an academic reference but nonetheless the "definitive reference on the KKK" but likely "of interest only to crime and KKK hobbyists". He praised the last three chapters especially. M. Stark said the "Komrades in Arms" section seemed somewhat off-topic, with many of the entries being on far-righters with little or no tie to the Klan. Some reviewers again critiqued the organizational structure of this edition, though Stark said it was effective for some of the chapters. Becker called the structure "distinctive" and said the book was difficult to use without referring to the index; Gilson called the way the book was organized "interesting".
