= Tempora mutantur =

Latin adage

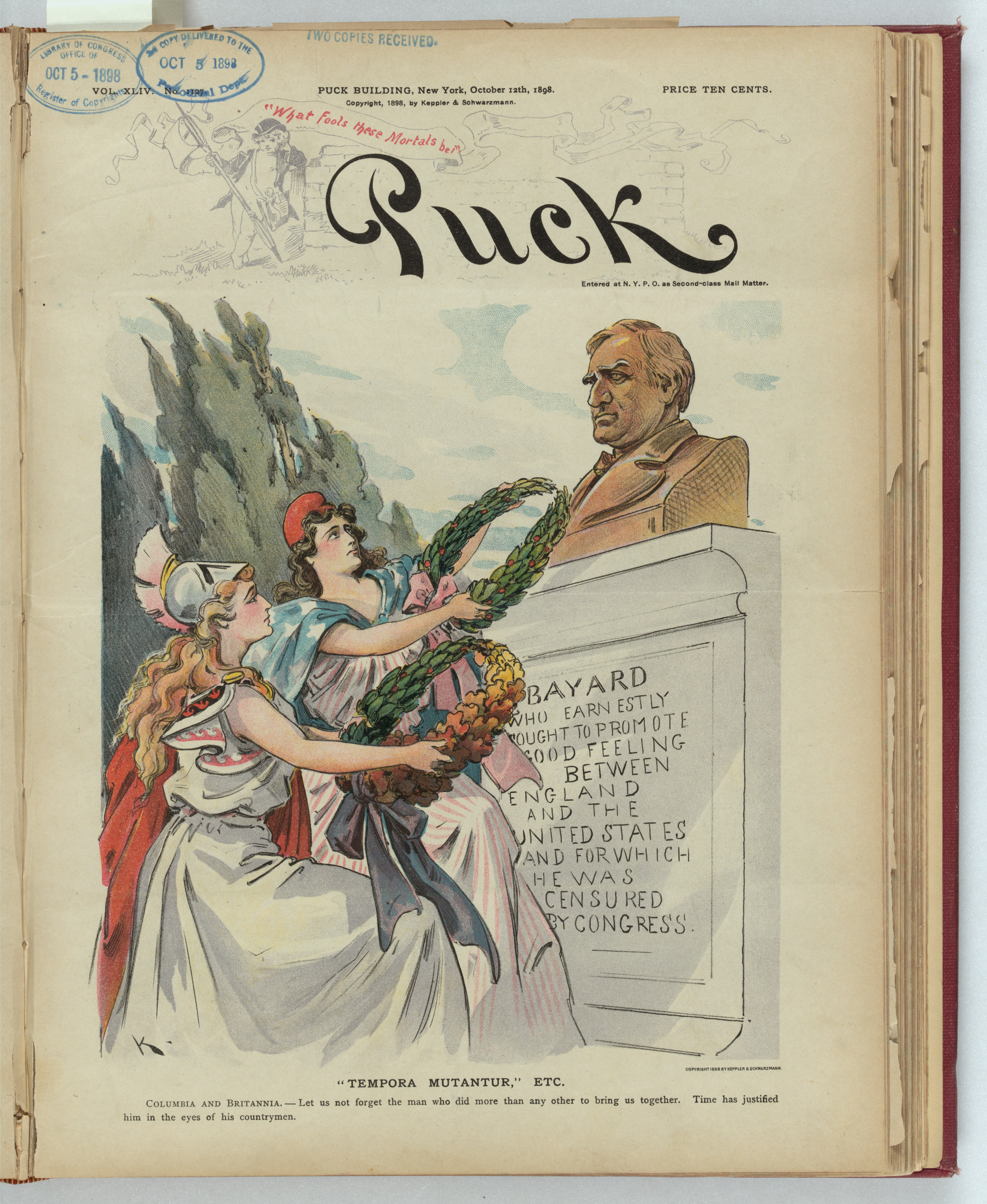
Tempora mutantur, LOC

Tempora mutantur is a Latin adage that refers to the changes brought about by the passage of time. It also appears in various longer hexametric forms, most commonly Tempora mutantur, nos et mutamur in illis, meaning "Times are changed; we also are changed with them". This hexameter is not found in Classical Latin, but is a variant of phrases of Ovid, to whom it is sometimes mis-attributed. In fact, it dates to 16th-century Germany, the time of the Protestant Reformation, and it subsequently was popularised in various forms.

== Wording ==
Tempora mutantur, nos et mutamur in illis

can be strictly translated as:

"Times are changed; we, too, are changed within them."

Like many adages and proverbial maxims drawn from the Latin cultural tradition, this line is in the hexameter verse used in Greek and Latin epic poetry. All other Latin verses cited in this page are hexameters as well.

The fact that et follows nos and is accented in the hexameter's rhythm gives an emphasis to it. In this position et, normally meaning "and," can take an emphatic meaning and signify "also, too," or "even".

== Grammar ==
"Tempora," a neuter plural and the subject of the first clause, means "times". "Mutantur" is a third person plural present passive, meaning "are changed." "Nos" is the personal pronoun and subject of the second clause, meaning "we," with emphatic force. "Mutamur" is the first person plural present passive, meaning "are changed" as well. "In illis" is an ablative plural referring back to "tempora" and so means "within them". The sentence is also a hexameter verse.

== History ==
Change is an ancient theme in Western philosophy, in which the contribution of the pre-Socratic Heraclitus has been influential. It is summarized in Ancient Greek as panta rhei (πάντα ῥεῖ, "everything flows"). The Latin formulation tempora mutantur is not classical, and does not have a generally accepted attribution – it is often identified as "traditional" – though it is frequently misattributed, particularly to Ovid. It is typically considered a variant of omnia mutantur "everything is changed", specifically from Ovid's Metamorphoses, in the phrase omnia mutantur, nihil interit "everything is changed, nothing perishes". However, the earliest attestation is from the German theologian Caspar Huberinus (1500–1553), who instead uses tempora mutantur as a variant of tempora labuntur "time slips away", from Ovid's Fasti. But the phrase tempora mutantur is in the passive, where as labuntur is form of a deponent verb; its passive form conveys an active meaning.

Various longer Latin forms and vernacular translations appear in 16th and early 17th century; these are discussed below.

=== German ===
The earliest attestations are in German Latin literature of the 16th century:

Prior to 1554, the Protestant Reformer Caspar Huberinus completes Ovid's verse in Fasti with tempora mutantur. Ovid's Fasti, VI, 771–772 reads:

Tempora labuntur, tacitisque senescimus annis,
et fugiunt freno non remorante dies.

The times slip away, and we grow old with the silent years,
and the days flee unchecked by a rein.

Fasti was popular in the 16th century, and this passage, near the end of the last extant book of the Fasti, is interpreted as expressing the poet's own old age.

Huberinus rewrites the second line as:

Tempora labuntur, tacitisque senescimus annis;
Tempora mutantur, nosque mutamur in illis.

"Times are slipping away, and we get older by (through, during, with, because of) the silent years"
(nosque = the same as nos et, with different hexameter rhythm)

The German translation is added in 1565 by Johannes Nas:

Tempora mutantur et nos mutamur in ipsis;
Die zeit wirdt verendert / und wir in der zeit.

(ipsis = "themselves")

Finally a couplet dedicated by Matthew Borbonius in 1595 to emperor Lothair I.
Also selected for the anthology Delitiae Poetarum Germanorum, 1612, vol. 1, p. 685 (GIF).

Omnia mutantur, nos et mutamur in illis Illa vices quasdam res habet, illa vices.	"All things are changed, and we are changed with them that matter has some changes, it (does have) changes".

=== English ===
In English vernacular literature it is quoted as "proverbial" in William Harrison's Description of England, 1577, p. 170, part of Holinshed's Chronicles, in the form:

Tempora mutantur, et nos mutamur in illis

with the translation:

"The times change, and we change with them."

It appears in John Lyly's Euphues I 276, 1578, as cited in Dictionary of Proverbs, by George Latimer Apperson, Martin Manser, p. 582 as

"The tymes are chaunged as Ouid sayeth, and wee are chaunged in the times."

in modern spelling:

"The times are changed, as Ovid says, and we are changed in the times."

It gained popularity as a couplet by John Owen, in his popular Epigrammata, 1613 Lib. I. ad Edoardum Noel, epigram 58 O Tempora!:

Tempora mutantur, nos et mutamur in illis;
Quo modo? fit semper tempore pejor homo.

in direct translation (of second line):

"How's that? The man (mankind) always gets worse with time"

Translated by Harvey, 1677, as:

"The Times are Chang'd, and in them Chang'd are we:
How? Man as Times grow worse, grows worse we see."

=== Incorrect attributions ===
It is incorrectly attributed to Cicero, presumably a confusion with his O tempora o mores! It is sometimes attributed to Borbonius (1595), though he was predated by over 50 years by others.

Georg Büchmann, Geflügelte Worte: Der Citatenschatz des deutschen Volkes, ed. K. Weidling, 1898 edition, p. 506, confuses historical and poetical reality naming emperor Lothair I as the source and the couplet by Matthias Borbonius printed in 1612 as the quote.

Brewer's Dictionary 1898 edition confuses Borbonius' first name (Matthew) with another poet (Nicholas), the entry reading:

"Omnia mutantur, nos et mutamur in illis," is by Nicholas Borbonius, a Latin poet of the sixteenth century. Dr. Sandys says that the Emperor Lothair, of the Holy Roman Empire, had already said, "Tempora mutantur, nos et mutamur in illis."

== Cultural references ==
Joseph Haydn gave his Symphony No. 64 the title Tempora mutantur.

In James Joyce's novel A Portrait of the Artist as a Young Man, the cronies of the protagonist's (Stephen Dedalus's) father ask him to prove his ability in Latin by asking him "whether it was correct to say: tempora mutantur nos et mutamur or tempora mutantur et nos mutamur in illis." The phrase is meant to be an ironic reference to the decline in fortunes of the Dedalus family at this point in the novel.

In Pierson v. Post, dissenting judge and future US Supreme Court Justice Henry Brockholst Livingston argued "If any thing, therefore, in the digests or pandects shall appear to militate against the defendant in error, who, on this occasion, was foxhunter, we have only to say tempora mutantur, and if men themselves change with the times, why should not laws also undergo an alteration?"

The English print-maker William Washington (1885-1956) added the adage as an inscription to his 1929 engraving, St Olave's, Southwark, which depicts the demolition of St Olave's Church, Southwark, London, in 1928 to make way for modern development.

The adage is inscribed on the Convention Center at Caesars Palace in Las Vegas.

In July 2017 "Tempora mutantur, et nos mutamur in illis" was the first tweet of UK Conservative politician Jacob Rees-Mogg.

In the Yes, Prime Minister episode ‘The National Education Service’, Cabinet Secretary Sir Humphrey Appleby recites the phrase after Prime Minister Jim Hacker claims that "hardly anybody knows [Latin] nowadays".

== See also ==
- Impermanence
