= Becoming (philosophy) =

Concept of an event developing from itself

Becoming is a basic concept of dialectics that describes the processual nature of the world, the emergence and decay of essences, things and states. In contrast to change, becoming describes an event that develops from itself. Starting from this concept, philosophical thinking attempts to interpret processuality and changeability.

The word “becoming” is a substantive verb. The concept of becoming is a fundamental category of metaphysics. While the opposite term “being” in the absolute sense refers to a permanence, a stability in time, becoming refers to a progressive change of what sometimes is not and then is again, through a change in its attributes.

== Philosophy ==
=== Greek antiquity ===
==== Parmenides and Heraclitus ====
In ancient philosophy, Heraclitus (* around 520 - around 460 BC) was already concerned with the question of becoming (panta rhei). According to Heraclitus, everything in the world is constantly changing, i.e. nothing remains as it was, everything is constantly changing. He illustrated this principle of constant becoming and passing away with the image of the river: “You cannot step into the same river twice” because the water is always flowing and constantly renewing itself. According to Heraclitus, change is the basic principle of reality - everything is in flux, nothing remains the same. In contrast, the ancient philosopher Parmenides (around 520/515 BC - 46) rejected becoming and only saw unchanging existence as real. In his doctrine of Eleatism, only existence exists, while change is regarded as an illusion.

==== Plato ====
According to the Platonic view, sensory phenomena are subject to constant change. Ideas, on the other hand, are always unchanging. Plato makes a fundamental distinction between two areas of reality: the world of eternal, unchanging ideas (the “being”) and the sensually perceptible world, which is characterized by constant change and transformation (the “becoming”). In the dialog Sophist, Plato attempts to refute Parmenides' thesis that there is no non-being (and therefore no becoming).

==== Aristotle ====
Aristotle distinguishes between several meanings of becoming: on the one hand becoming as a transition from possibility to actuality, on the other hand the four forms of change: 1. substantial change (coming into being and passing away); 2. qualitative change; 3. quantitative change and 4. change of place (movement in the narrow sense).

=== Modern times ===
==== Hegel ====
In Hegel's dialectical logic, becoming is the unity of being and nothingness.

The ‘'nothing’' is as this immediate, self-same, just as conversely ‘'the same’', which is ‘'being’'. The truth of both being and nothingness is therefore the “unity” of both; this unity is “becoming”.

— Hegel, Encyclopaedia of the Philosophical Sciences in Basic Outline, § 88

In the description of Being and Nothingness, Hegel elaborates the following:

- Attributes of Being:
  - pure thought,
  - an immediate,
  - simple and indeterminate,
  - the beginning.
- Attributes of nothingness:
  - pure abstraction,
  - direct,
  - equal to itself,
  - the absolute negative.

He now combines both conceptual determinations into the unity of becoming.

== Physics ==
Jürgen Mittelstraß emphasizes the central importance of the term “becoming” in the context of science and knowledge. Mittelstraß emphasizes that science is not a static, closed system, but is constantly in the process of becoming. This implies that scientific knowledge is always provisional and continues to develop in a historical and social context.

Modern physics and its natural philosophical interpretation discuss, among other things:

- whether, on the basis of the Minkowski space, events and not places or points in time represent the actual reality (modern Eleatism);
- which follows from McTaggart's theory of time;
- whether the second law of thermodynamics proves a time sequence;
- whether the “now” has a physical or only a psychological meaning.

== See also ==
- Impermanence
- Science of Logic, Hegel's book introducing the German term
- The One (philosophy)
- Wholeness (philosophy)
- Nunc stans

== Literature ==
- Jürgen Mittelstraß: Werden, in: Jürgen Mittelstraß (Hrsg.): Enzyklopädie Philosophie und Wissenschaftstheorie. 2. Auflage. Band 8: Th – Z. Stuttgart, Metzler 2018, ISBN 978-3-476-02107-6, S. 459 – 461 (mit ausführlichem Werk- und Literaturverzeichnis).
- Anton Hügli, Poul Lübcke (Hrsg.): Philosophielexikon. Personen und Begriffe der abendländischen Philosophie von der Antike bis zur Gegenwart. Erw. Auflage. Rowohlt, Reinbek bei Hamburg 2013 (rororo; 55689; Rowohlts Enzyklopädie), ISBN 978-3-499-55689-0, S. 946 – 949: Werden (mit Lit.verz.)
