= Erich Angermann =

German historian of modern age

Erich Angermann (2 March 1927 − 9 November 1992) was a German historian for North American history at the University of Cologne.

== Life ==
Angermann was born in 1927 as the son of an elementary school teacher in Chemnitz. He attended the humanistic Maximiliansgymnasium München. From 1947 he studied history, German and English language and literature at the Ludwig-Maximilians-Universität München. In 1952 he received his doctorate under Franz Schnabel on the subject Karl Mathy als Sozial- und Wirtschaftspolitiker 1842–48 (Karl Mathy as a social and economic politician 1842–48). From 1952 Angermann was scientific assistant of the Historical Commission at the Bavarian Academy of Sciences (for the Neue Deutsche Biographie) and at the Amerika-Institut (Munich). In 1961 followed the Habilitation with Franz Schnabel with a thesis on the liberal political scientist and politician Robert von Mohl. In 1963 he was appointed to a chair of modern history with special emphasis on North American history at the University of Cologne, a position he held until his retirement in 1992. He was elected Dean of The Faculty of Letters and Science for 1968/69 and assured that the student unrest were relatively mild in Cologne. His liberal spirit and respect for students saved many critical situations. His successor to the chair of his department was Jürgen Heideking.

Angermann initiated and chaired a group of highly influential German and American historians that succeeded in convincing the German government to set up and finance the German Historical Institute Washington DC. After the foundation he continued on its scientific advisory board which he chaired until 1991. Angermann's pupils include Horst Dippel, Michael Klöcker, Hermann Wellenreuther, Arnd Krüger, Norbert Finzsch, Vera Nünning, Torsten Oppelland and Klaus Larres. Wellenreuther dedicated his book Von Chaos und Krieg zu Ordnung und Frieden. Der Amerikanischen Revolution erster Teil, 1775–1783 to his teacher Angermann.

In the winter semester 1970/71 Angermann was a visiting professor at St Antony's College, Oxford. From 1971 Angermann was a full member of the Historical Commission. In 1982/1983 he was a research fellow at the Historisches Kolleg in Munich. As research fellow he made the American Civil War in the college year the main focus of his research in comparison with the Central European fights for unification in the third quarter of the 19th century. In 1984 he became an honorary member of the Academy for the Humanities and the Sciences, City University of New York.

Angermann died in Herrsching am Ammersee at the age of 65.

== Publications ==
- Die Vereinigten Staaten von Amerika seit 1917 (dtv-Weltgeschichte des 20. Jahrhunderts. Vol. 7). 9th extended edition. Deutscher Taschenbuch-Verlag, Munich 1995, ISBN 3-423-04007-6.
- Die Vereinigten Staaten von Amerika als Weltmacht. Innen- und außenpolitische Entwicklungen seit 1917. OCLC 249009969 Klett, Stuttgart 1987, ISBN 978-3-12-490270-2.
- Abraham Lincoln und die Erneuerung der nationalen Identität der Vereinigten Staaten von Amerika.OCLC 964348042 (Schriften des Historischen Kollegs. Vorträge. Vol. 7). Stiftung Historisches Kolleg, Munich 1984 (Numerised).
- Revolution und Bewahrung. Untersuchungen zum Spannungsgefüge von revolutionärem Selbstverständnis und politischer Praxis in den Vereinigten Staaten von Amerika. OCLC 781199712 Oldenbourg, Munich 1979, ISBN 978-3-486-48671-1.
- Robert von Mohl: 1799–1875. Leben und Werk eines altliberalen Staatsgelehrten (Politica. Abhandlungen und Texte zur politischen Wissenschaft. Vol. 8). Luchterhand, Neuwied 1962 (Zugleich: München, Universität, Habilitationsschrift, 1961).
- Karl Mathy als Sozial- und Wirtschaftspolitiker 1842–1848. Munich 1952 (Munich, Phil. Fak., Dissertation dated 22 Aug. 1952).

== Literature ==
- "Angermann, Erich." In Große Bayerische Biographische Enzyklopädie. Herausgegeben von Hans-Michael Körner with the collaboration of Bruno Jahn. Vol. 1: A–G. Saur, Munich 2005, ISBN 978-3-598-11460-1, p. 50.
- Norbert Finzsch, Hermann Wellenreuther (ed.): Liberalitas. Festschrift für Erich Angermann zum 65. Geburtstag (Transatlantische historische Studien. Vol. 1). Steiner, Stuttgart 1992, ISBN 978-3-515-05656-4 (with a bibliography of his writings on pp. 519–530).
- Hermann Wellenreuther: "Erich Angermann 1927–1992." In Historische Zeitschrift. Vol. 258, 1994, pp. 279–285.
