= Prokopton =

Studio album by Aephanemer
- Released: 22 March 2019
- Genres: Folk metal, melodic death metal, symphonic death metal
- Length: 44:48
- Label: Primeval Records

Aephanemer chronology
Memento Mori (2016)	Prokopton (2019)	A Dream of Wilderness (2021)

Professional ratings
Review scores
Source	Rating
The Black Planet	8/10
Dead Rhetoric	8.5/10
Distorted Sound	8/10
Femme Metal	90/100
GBHBL	10/10

Prokopton is the second studio album by French melodic death metal band Aephanemer, released on 22 March 2019 via Primeval Records, followed by a re-release on 25 October 2019 via Napalm Records. It was mixed by Dan Swanö and mastered by Mika Jussila. The cover art was drawn by Niklas Sundin. The band toured to promote the album including joining Scottish metal band Alestorm's Canadian tour as the supporting act.

== Track listing ==
All lyrics are written by Marion Bascoul; all music is composed by Martin Hamiche.

No.	Title	Length
1.	"Prokopton"	5:17
2.	"The Sovereign"	5:22
3.	"Dissonance Within"	6:13
4.	"Snowblind"	4:30
5.	"At Eternity's Gate"	2:59
6.	"Back Again"	5:50
7.	"Bloodline"	5:29
8.	"If I Should Die"	9:08

== Personnel ==
- Marion Bascoul – vocals, rhythm guitar
- Martin Hamiche – lead guitar
- Lucie Woaye Hune – bass guitar
- Mickaël Bonnevialle – drums
