= Omnia mutantur =

Omnia mutantur is a Latin phrase meaning "everything changes". It is most often used as part of two other phrases:

- Omnia mutantur, nihil interit ("everything changes, nothing perishes"), by Ovid in his Metamorphoses, and
- Omnia mutantur nos et mutamur in illis ("all things change, and we change with them"), a traditional saying, found in various forms, notably Tempora mutantur nos et mutamur in illis.
