= Michael Newton (author) =

American writer (1951–2021)

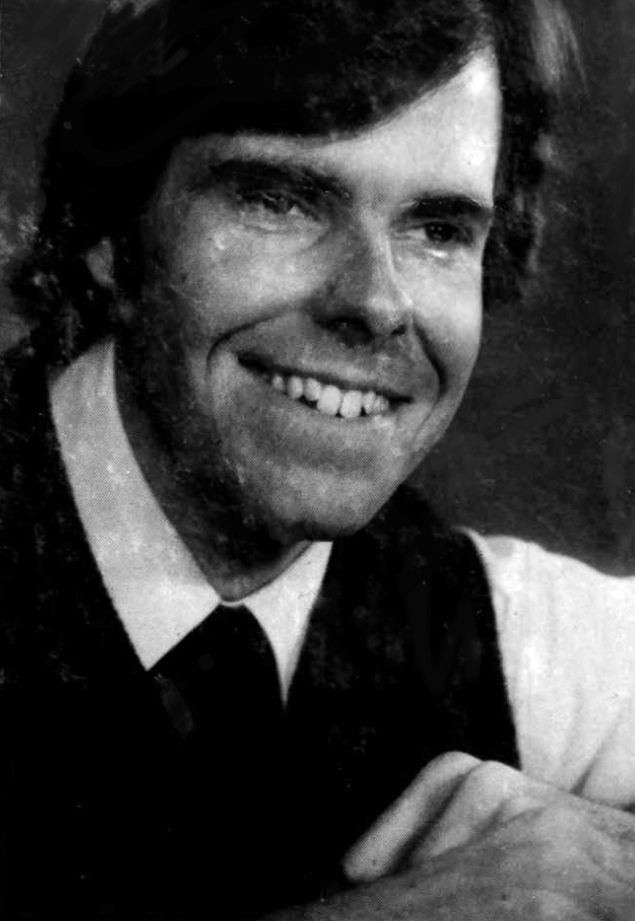
- 1979 photo of Newton
- Born: September 16, 1951; Bakersfield, California, U.S.
- Died: September 6, 2021 (aged 69); Nashville, Indiana, U.S.
- Education: Bakersfield College, California State College (B.A., 1973), University of Nevada
- Occupation: Writer
- Writing career
- Pen name: Lyle Brandt, Don Pendleton, Jack Buchanan, Paul Malone
- Genres: Mystery; Thriller; Adventure; Historical; True crime; Western; How-to
- Subjects: Serial killers; Ku Klux Klan
- Notable works: The Invisible Empire: The Ku Klux Klan in Florida, Hunting Humans
- Website: michaelnewton.homestead.com

Michael Newton (September 16, 1951 – September 6, 2021) was an American author and journalist. He published 357 books throughout his career, which included 258 novels and 99 nonfiction books. Born in Bakersfield, California, Newton was a high school teacher and a bodyguard before he shifted to writing. He received his bachelor's degree from California State College in 1973, where he did graduate studies, before transferring to the University of Nevada in 1979.

Newton started his writing career as a ghostwriter on Don Pendleton's The Executioner book series. He published mostly novels, utilizing several pseudonyms. He also wrote several non-fiction books, particularly reference works. Many of his reference works were on serial killers. Another focus was the Ku Klux Klan, on which he wrote several reference works; Newton's 2001 book on the KKK's history in Florida, The Invisible Empire: The Ku Klux Klan in Florida, received positive academic reviews and an award from the Florida Historical Society.

== Early life and education ==
Michael Newton was born September 16, 1951, in Bakersfield, California, United States, the son of Ralph A. Newton and Hazel Newton. His mother was a hairdresser and his father was a deliveryman. Newton attended Bakersfield College from 1969 to 1971, before attending California State College, where he received his bachelor's degree in 1973. He did graduate studies at the California State College from 1973 to 1975, before transferring to the University of Nevada from 1979 to 1980.

He worked as a high school social studies teacher for several years in the early to mid 1970s. He then became a bodyguard, initially for American singer Merle Haggard's family, before working as a bodyguard for the security companies Trans-West Security and Thornhill Security. He then returned to being a social studies and English teacher, before he lived in Nashville, Indiana and worked as a journalist.

== Writing career ==
He began writing as a ghostwriter for Don Pendleton's The Executioner book series. His first book under his own name came in 1979. Most of his books were novels, while the majority of his non-fiction output were reference works. Altogether, Newton published 357 books, which included 258 novels and 99 nonfiction books. Several of his fiction books were published under pseudonyms.

Newton's non-fiction works include several on the Ku Klux Klan, including The Invisible Empire: The Ku Klux Klan in Florida (2001), The Ku Klux Klan: History, Organization, Language, Influence and Activities of America's Most Notorious Secret Society (2007), The Ku Klux Klan in Mississippi: A History (2010), and White Robes and Burning Crosses (2014). He had researched the KKK for, as of 2007, over 45 years. Paul Ortiz praised The Invisible Empire as an "excellent monograph", praising Newton's "careful attention to location, nuance, and change over time." G. Zuber for The Journal of Southern Religion said "the book represents one of the best and most concise overviews of Klan history and scholarship to date". It received the Rembert Patrick Annual Book Award from the Florida Historical Society. Scholar Patrick Mason called The Ku Klux Klan in Mississippi "long on detail but relatively short on analysis", saying he "packs a lot of well-researched information [...] but scholars will wish he did a little more unpacking as well."

He has also published several encyclopedias on true crime and serial killers, including Hunting Humans. He attributed his interest in serial killers to reading about Jack the Ripper in his youth. He researched his true crime encyclopedias through police reports, newspapers, court and psychiatric records of those he profiled. He managed to interview some actual serial killers for the book, including Carroll Cole. He and his wife befriended him and were invited to watch Cole's 1985 execution. They attended when even Cole's parents did not; he was given Cole's ashes. He said of writing the book was that his intention was to "tell stories about a bunch of weirdos". He wrote a book with Jan Knowlton, who claimed her father was the Black Dahlia killer, entitled Daddy Was the Black Dahlia Killer.

Newton's Encyclopedia of Cryptozoology won the American Library Association's award for Outstanding Reference Work in 2006. The book features 2,744 entries on cryptozoology with a glossary and bibliography. It was positively reviewed in The Quarterly Review of Biology as enjoyable reading and an important resource on the topic.

== Personal life and death ==
He collaborated on several of his books with his first wife, Judy Ann Boring, who he married in 1976. They later divorced. He remarried to Heather Marie Locken, an editor, in 2004. He described himself as a political independent, and was a member of the American Civil Liberties Union, the Southern Poverty Law Center, People for the Ethical Treatment of Animals, several animal welfare organizations, and the British Columbia Scientific Cryptozoology Club.

Newton died September 6, 2021, in Nashville, Indiana.

== Bibliography ==
=== Fiction ===
- The Ripper (1978)
- The Satan Ring (1978)

==== The Executioner ====
- #--: The Executioner's War Book (with Don Pendleton)
- #29: Command Strike (with Don Pendleton)
- #30: Cleveland Pipeline (with Don Pendleton)
- #31: Arizona Ambush (with Don Pendleton)
- #32: Tennessee Smash (with Don Pendleton)
- #38: Satan's Sabbath (with Don Pendleton)
- #41: The Violent Streets
- #45: Paramilitary Plot
- #49: Doomsday Disciples
- #55: Paradines Gauntlet
- #60: Sold for Slaughter
- #68: Prairie Fire
- #71: Blood Dues
- #75: The Bone Yard
- #77: Hollywood Hell
- #81: Shock Waves
- #83: Missouri Deathwatch
- #89: Defenders and Believers
- #91: The Trial
- #100: Blood Testament
- #101: Eternal Triangle
- #103: Assault on Rome
- #106: Run to Ground
- #108: Time to Kill
- #111: The Fiery Cross
- #114: Cold Judgment
- #119: Line of Fire
- #124: Night Kill
- #129: Haitian Hit
- #133: Blood Run
- #142: Fatal Error
- #149: Blood Rules
- #151: Message to Medellin
- #155: Hawaiian Heat
- #162: Colors of Hell
- #165: Fire Sweep
- #170: Baja Blitz
- #186: Fire Burst
- #187: Cleansing Flame
- #190: Killing Range
- #194: Deadly Contest
- #200: Crisis Point
- #206: Hunting Cry
- #210: Fire Lash
- #211: Steel Claws
- #212: Ride the Beast
- #222: Patriot Gambit
- #223: Hour of Conflict
- #224: Call to Arms
- #229: Zero Tolerance
- #233: Tough Justice
- #249: Shadow Target
- #258: Target Lock
- #268: Shattered Trust
- #269: Shifting Shadows
- #270: Judgment Day
- #277: Dirty Mission
- #281: Blood Stone
- #287: Rogue Warrior
- #290: Pursued
- #300: Warrior's Requiem
- #303: Sea of Terror
- #308: Into the Fire
- #309: Flames of Fury
- #310: Killing Heat
- #317: Hour of Judgment
- #330: Dual Action
- #334: Jungle Justice
- #338: Nuclear Reaction
- #344: Primal Law
- #357: Extreme Justice
- #361: Final Resort
- #366: Pele's Fire

==== SuperBolan ====
- #5: Flight 741
- #8: Rogue Force
- #13: Flesh and Blood
- #19: Assault
- #29: Lethal Impact
- #36: Hellground
- #39: Blood Strike
- #41: Vendetta
- #43: Omega Game
- #47: Jungle Law
- #56: Terror Spin
- #64: Initiation
- #65: Cloud of Death
- #66: Termination Point
- #69: Vengeance
- #71: Killsport
- #79: Power of the Lance
- #80: A Dying Evil
- #88: Sleepers
- #93: Retaliation
- #107: Survival Reflex
- #111: State of Evil
- #116 Ripple Effect
- #124: Colony of Evil
- #129: Altered State

==== Stony Man ====
- #7: Stony Man VII
- #9: Strikepoint
- #11: Target America
- #15: Blood Debt
- #17: Vortex
- #28: Blood Star

==== The Destroyer ====
- #108: Bamboo Dragon
- #110: Never Say Die
- #132: Wolf's Bane
- #133: Troubled Water

==== The Gun Series ====
- The Gun (2002)
- Justice Gun (2003)
- Vengeance Gun (2004)
- Rebel Gun (2005)
- Bounty Gun (2006)

==== Lawman Series ====
- The Lawman (2007)
- Slade's Law (2008)
- Helltown (2008)
- Massacre Trail (2009)
- Hanging Judge (2009)
- Manhunt (2010)

=== Non-fiction ===
- Monsters, Mysteries and Man (1979)
- A Case of Conspiracy (1980, later reprinted as The King Conspiracy)
- Bitter Grain (1980, later reprinted as Huey Newton and the Black Panther Party)
- The FBI Plot (1980)
- Mass Murder: An Annotated Bibliography (1988)
- Terrorism in the United States and Europe: An Annotated Bibliography (1988; with Judy Newton)
- The FBI Most Wanted: An Encyclopedia (1989)
- How to Write Action-Adventure Novels (1989)
- Armed and Dangerous: A Writer's Guide to Weapons (1990)
- Hunting Humans: An Encyclopedia of Serial Killers (1990)
- The Ku Klux Klan: An Encyclopedia (1991; with Judy Newton). Rereleased as The Ku Klux Klan: History, Organization, Language, Influence and Activities of America's Most Notorious Secret Society (2007)
- Racial and Religious Violence in America (1991; with Judy Newton)
- Serial Slaughter: What's behind America's Murder Epidemic? (1992)
- Raising Hell: An Encyclopedia of Devil Worship and Satanic Crime (1993)
- Bad Girls Do It! An Encyclopedia of Female Murderers (1993)
- Silent Rage: Inside the Mind of a Serial Killer (1994)
- Daddy Was the Black Dahlia Killer (1995; with Janice Knowlton)
- Killer Cops (1997)
- Waste Land (1998)
- Holy Homicide: An Encyclopedia of Those Who Go with Their God … and Kill! (1998)
- Rope (1998)
- Black Collar Crimes (1998)
- Cop Killers: An Encyclopedia (1998)
- Still at Large (1998)
- Encyclopedia of Serial Killers: A Study of the Chilling Criminal Phenomenon from the "Angels of Death" to the "Zodiac" Killer (2000)
- Killer Kids (2000)
- Stolen Away (2000)
- Century of Slaughter (2000)
- The Invisible Empire: The Ku Klux Klan in Florida (2001)
- The Encyclopedia of Kidnappings (2002)
- The Encyclopedia of Bank Robberies, Heists, and Capers (2002)
- The Encyclopedia of Forensic Science (2003)
- The FBI Encyclopedia (2004)
- The Encyclopedia of High-Tech Crime and Crime-Fighting (2004)
- The Encyclopedia of Unsolved Crimes (2004)
- Encyclopedia of Cryptozoology: A Global Guide to Hidden Animals and Their Pursuers (2005)
- The Encyclopedia of Conspiracies and Conspiracy Theories (2006)
- The Encyclopedia of Serial Killers (2006)
- The FBI and the KKK: A Critical History (2006)
- Strange Indiana Monsters (2007)
- The Encyclopedia of American Law Enforcement (2007)
- Florida's Unexpected Wildlife: Exotic Species, Living Fossils, and Mythical Beasts in the Sunshine State (2007)
- The Encyclopedia of Crime Scene Investigation (2007)
- Serial Killers (2007)
- Gangsters Encyclopedia (2007)
- Celebrities and Crime (2008)
- Gangs and Gang Crimes (2008)
- Unsolved Crimes (2008)
- Bank Robbery (2008)
- The Encyclopedia of Unsolved Crimes (2009)
- Mr. Mob: The Life and Crimes of Moe Dalitz (2009)
- Criminal Justice: Crime and Criminals (2010)
- Criminal Justice: Crime-fighting and Crime Prevention (2010)
- The Ku Klux Klan in Mississippi: A History (2010)
- The Mafia at Apalachin, 1957 (2012)
- Famous Assassinations in World History: An Encyclopedia (2014)
- White Robes and Burning Crosses: A History of the Ku Klux Klan From 1866 (2014)
- The National States Rights Party: A History (2017)
