= Impermanence =

Philosophical concept

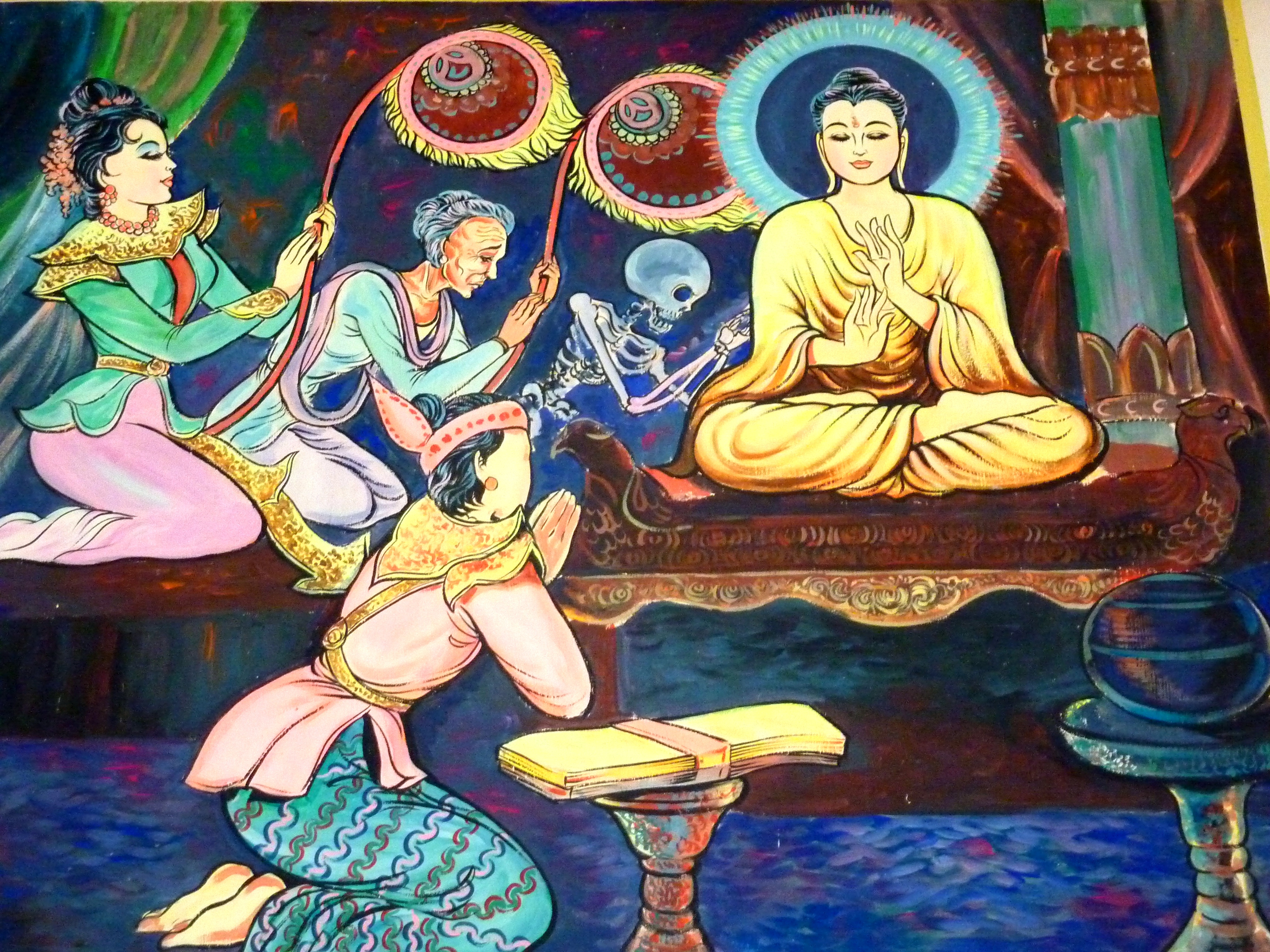
A Buddhist painting displaying Impermanence

Impermanence, also known as the philosophical problem of change, is a philosophical concept addressed in a variety of religions and philosophies. In Eastern philosophy it is notable for its role in the Buddhist three marks of existence. It is also an important element of Hinduism. In Western philosophy it is most famously known through its first appearance in Greek philosophy in the writings of Heraclitus and in his doctrine of panta rhei (everything flows). In Western philosophy, the concept is also referred to as becoming.

== Indian religions ==
The Pali word for impermanence, anicca, is a compound word consisting of "a" meaning non-, and "nicca" meaning "constant, continuous, permanent". While 'nicca' is the concept of continuity and permanence, 'anicca' refers to its exact opposite: the absence of permanence and continuity. The term is synonymous with the Sanskrit term anitya (a + nitya). The concept of impermanence is prominent in Buddhism, and it is also found in various schools of Hinduism and Jainism. The term also appears in the Rigveda.

=== Buddhism ===
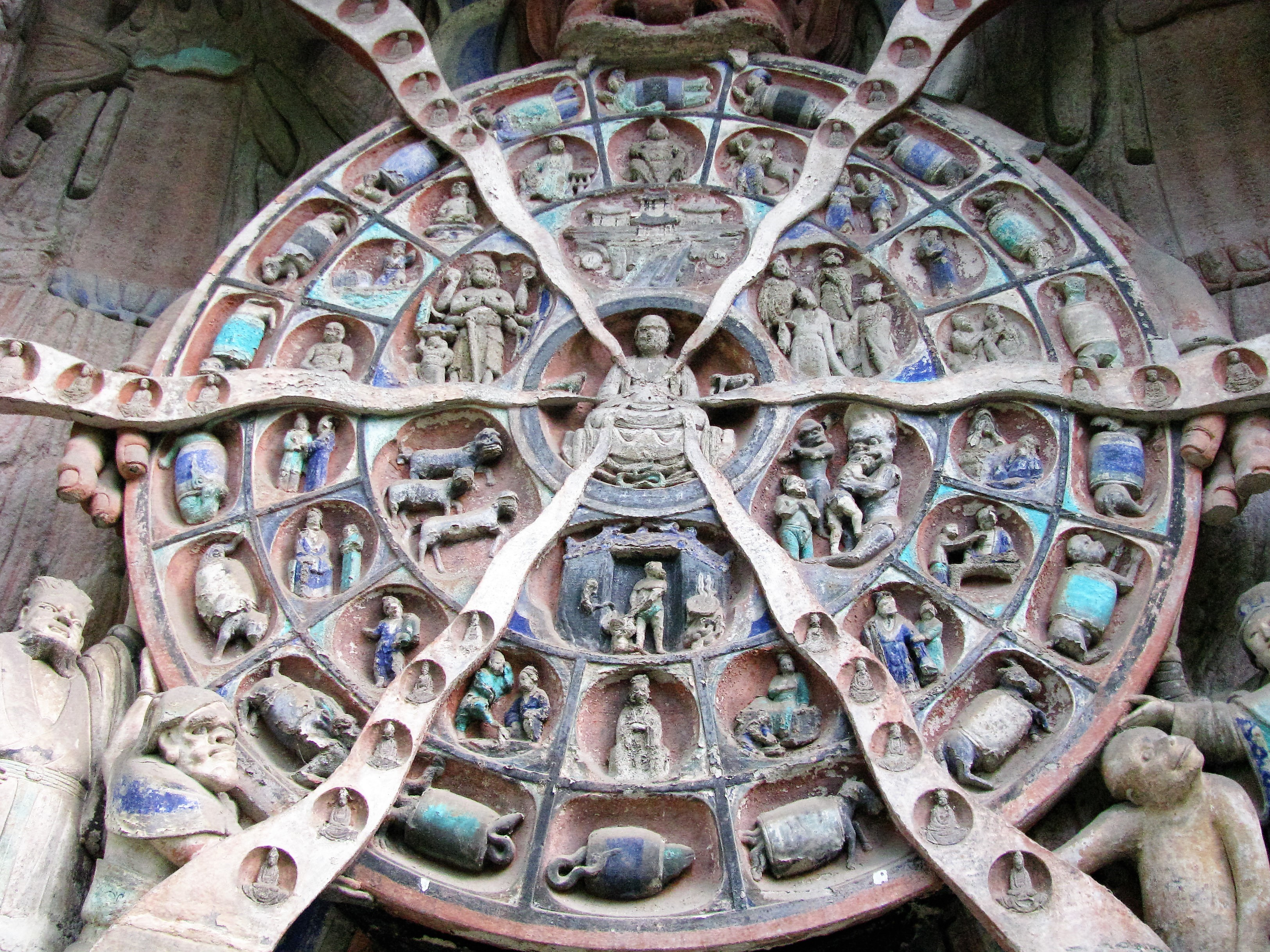
According to Buddhism, living beings go through many births. Buddhism does not teach the existence of a permanent, immutable soul. The birth of one form from another is part of a process of continuous change.

Impermanence, called anicca (Pāli) or anitya (Sanskrit), appears extensively in the Pali Canon as one of the essential doctrines of Buddhism. The doctrine asserts that all of conditioned existence, without exception, is "transient, evanescent, inconstant". All temporal things, whether material or mental, are compounded objects in a continuous change of condition, subject to decline and destruction. All physical and mental events are not metaphysically real. They are not constant or permanent; they come into being and dissolve.

=== Hinduism ===
The term anitya (अनित्य), in the sense of impermanence of objects and life, appears in verse 1.2.10 of the Katha Upanishad, one of the Principal Upanishads of Hinduism. It asserts that the material world is impermanent, but the impermanent nature of things is an opportunity to obtain what is permanent (nitya), as the Hindu scripture presents its doctrine about Atman (Self). The term Anitya also appears in the Bhagavad Gita in a similar context.

In Chapter 2 of the Bhagavad Gita, Krishna elucidates a profound spiritual truth to Arjuna, emphasizing the distinction between the eternal nature of the atman (soul) and the transient, perishable nature of the material world. Krishna conveys that while the body is subject to decay and death, the soul remains undying and unchanging. This teaching serves as a foundational philosophy in Hinduism, encouraging detachment from material concerns and an understanding of the true, eternal self. This insight is pivotal for Arjuna, as it reorients his perspective from the battlefield's immediate concerns to the broader, spiritual dimensions of existence, urging him to perform his duty without attachment to the outcomes.

Buddhism and Hinduism share the doctrine of Anicca or Anitya, that is, "nothing lasts, everything is in a constant state of change"; however, they disagree on the Anatta doctrine, that is, whether the Self exists or not. Even in the details of their respective impermanence theories, state Frank Hoffman and Deegalle Mahinda, Buddhist and Hindu traditions differ. Change associated with Anicca and associated attachments produces sorrow or Dukkha, as Buddhism asserts and therefore needs to be discarded for liberation (nibbana), while Hinduism asserts that not all change and attachments lead to Dukkha and some change – mental or physical or self-knowledge – leads to happiness and therefore needs to be sought for liberation (moksha). According to SzCzurek, "While in the Buddha's teaching the escape from anicca is anatta, according to Krishna what is nitya is atman".

== Western philosophy ==
Impermanence first appears in Greek philosophy in the writings of Heraclitus and his doctrine of panta rhei (everything flows). Heraclitus was famous for his insistence on ever-present change as being the fundamental essence of the universe, as stated in the famous saying, "No man ever steps in the same river twice". This is commonly considered to be a key contribution in the development of the philosophical concept of becoming, as contrasted with "being", and has sometimes been seen in a dialectical relationship with Parmenides' statement that "whatever is, is, and what is not cannot be", the latter being understood as a key contribution in the development of the philosophical concept of being. For this reason, Parmenides and Heraclitus are commonly considered to be two of the founders of ontology. Scholars have generally believed that either Parmenides was responding to Heraclitus, or Heraclitus to Parmenides, though opinion on who was responding to whom has varied over the course of the 20th and 21st centuries. Heraclitus' position was complemented by his stark commitment to a unity of opposites in the world, stating that "the path up and down are one and the same". Through these doctrines, Heraclitus characterized all existing entities by pairs of contrary properties, whereby no entity may ever occupy a single state at a single time. This, along with his cryptic utterance that "all entities come to be in accordance with this Logos" (literally, "word", "reason", or "account"), has been the subject of numerous interpretations.

Impermanence was widely but not universally accepted among subsequent Greek philosophers. Democritus' theory of atoms entailed that assemblages of atoms were impermanent. Pyrrho declared that everything was astathmēta (unstable) and anepikrita (unfixed). Plutarch commented on impermanence, saying, "And if the nature which is measured is subject to the same conditions as the time which measures it, this nature itself has no permanence, nor 'being,' but is becoming and perishing according to its relation to time." The Stoic philosopher, Marcus Aurelius' Meditations contains many comments about impermanence, such as “Bear in mind that everything that exists is already fraying at the edges, and in transition, subject to fragmentation and to rot.” (10.18)

Plato rejected impermanence, arguing against Heraclitus:

How can that be a real thing which is never in the same state? ... for at the moment that the observer approaches, then they become other ... so that you cannot get any further in knowing their nature or state .... but if that which knows and that which is known exist ever ... then I do not think they can resemble a process or flux ....

Several famous Roman Latin sayings are about impermanence, including Omnia mutantur, Sic transit gloria mundi, and Tempora mutantur.

== In arts and culture ==
- Akio Jissoji's Buddhist auteur film Mujo (also known as This Transient Life) owes its title to the doctrine of Impermanence.
- Impermanence is the title of a novella written by Daniel Frisano.
- "Impermanence" is the title of the 7th track on For Those That Wish to Exist by Architects.

== See also ==
- Reality in Buddhism
- Hōjōki
- Mono no aware
- The Tale of the Heike
- Wabi-sabi
- Philosophy of space and time
- Process philosophy
- Temporality
- Three marks of existence
- Vanitas
