= List of Latin phrases (O) =

This page is one of a series listing English translations of notable Latin phrases, such as veni, vidi, vici and et cetera. Some of the phrases are themselves translations of Greek phrases, as ancient Greek rhetoric and literature started centuries before the beginning of Latin literature in ancient Rome.

Latin	Translation	Notes
O Deus ego amo te	O God I Love You	attributed to Saint Francis Xavier
O fortunatos nimium sua si bona norint, agricolas	The farmers would count themselves lucky, if only they knew how good they had it	from Virgil in Georgics II, 458
o homines ad servitutem paratos	Men ready to be slaves!	attributed (in Tacitus, Annales, III, 65) to the Roman Emperor Tiberius, in disgust at the servile attitude of Roman senators; said of those who should be leaders but instead slavishly follow the lead of others
O tempora, o mores!	Oh, the times! Oh, the morals!	also translated "What times! What customs!"; from Cicero, Catilina I, 2
O Tite tute Tati tibi tanta tyranne tulisti	O tyrant Titus Tatius, what terrible calamities you brought onto yourself!	from Quintus Ennius, Annales (104), considered an example of a Latin tongue-twister
Obedientia civium urbis felicitas	The obedience of the citizens makes us a happy city	Motto of Dublin
obiit (ob.)	one died	"He/she died", inscription on gravestones; ob. also sometimes stands for obiter (in passing or incidentally)
obit anis, abit onus	The old woman dies, the burden is lifted	Arthur Schopenhauer
obit caeleps	Ob. Cael. or died a bachelor (implying no legitimate offspring ever existed to inherit, cf. d.s.p., d.s.p.s. and d.s.p.m.)	Heraldic visitation or County Visitation Books for England
obiter dictum	a thing said in passing	in law, an observation by a judge on some point of law not directly relevant to the case before him, and thus neither requiring his decision nor serving as a precedent, but nevertheless of persuasive authority. In general, any comment, remark or observation made in passing
obliti privatorum, publica curate	Forget private affairs, take care of public ones	Roman political saying which reminds that common good should be given priority over private matters for any person having a responsibility in the State
obscuris vera involvens	the truth being enveloped by obscure things	from Virgil
obscurum per obscurius	the obscure by means of the more obscure	An explanation that is less clear than what it tries to explain; synonymous with ignotum per ignotius
obtineo et teneo	to obtain and to keep	motto
obtorto collo	with a twisted neck	unwillingly
oculus dexter (O.D.)	right eye	Ophthalmologist shorthand
oculus sinister (O.S.)	left eye	
oderint dum metuant	let them hate, so long as they fear	favorite saying of Caligula, attributed originally to Lucius Accius, Roman tragic poet (170 BC)
odi et amo	I hate and I love	opening of Catullus 85; the entire poem reads, "odi et amo quare id faciam fortasse requiris / nescio sed fieri sentio et excrucior" (I hate and I love. Why do I do this, you perhaps ask. / I do not know, but I feel it happening to me and I am burning up.)
odi profanum vulgus et arceo	I hate the unholy rabble and keep them away	Horace, Carmina III, 1
odium theologicum	theological hatred	name for the special hatred generated in theological disputes
oleum camino	(pour) oil on the fire	from Erasmus' (1466–1536) collection of annotated Adagia
omne ignotum pro magnifico	every unknown thing [is taken] for great	or "everything unknown appears magnificent" The source is Tacitus: Agricola, Book 1, 30 where the sentence ends with 'est'. The quotation is found in Arthur Conan Doyle's Sherlock Holmes short story "The Red-Headed League" (1891) where the 'est' is missing.
omne initium difficile est	every beginning is difficult	
omne vivum ex ovo	every living thing is from an egg	foundational concept of modern biology, opposing the theory of spontaneous generation
Omnes homines sunt asini vel homines et asini sunt asini	All men are donkeys or men and donkeys are donkeys	a sophisma proposed and solved by 14th-century Albert of Saxony
omnes vulnerant, postuma necat, or, omnes feriunt, ultima necat	all [the hours] wound, last one kills	usual in clocks, reminding the reader of death
omnia cum deo	all with God	motto for Mount Lilydale Mercy College, Lilydale, Victoria, Australia
omnia dicta fortiora si dicta Latina	everything said [is] stronger if said in Latin	or "everything sounds more impressive when said in Latin"; a more common phrase with the same meaning is quidquid Latine dictum sit altum videtur (whatever said in Latin, seems profound)
omnia in mensura et numero et pondere disposuisti	Thou hast ordered all things in measure, and number, and weight.	Book of Wisdom, 11:21
Omnia mea mecum porto	All that is mine I carry with me	is a quote that Cicero ascribes to Bias of Priene
omnia mirari etiam tritissima	Find wonder in all things, even the most commonplace	is a motto that is attributed to Carl Linnaeus
omnia mutantur, nihil interit	everything changes, nothing perishes	Ovid (43 BC – 17 AD), Metamorphoses, book XV, line 165
omnia omnibus	all things to all men	1 Corinthians 9:22
si omnia ficta	if all (the words of poets) is fiction	Ovid, Metamorphoses, book XIII, lines 733–4: "si non omnia vates ficta"
omnia vincit amor	love conquers all	Virgil (70 BC – 19 BC), Eclogue X, line 69
omnia munda mundis	everything [is] pure to the pure [men]	from The New Testament
omnia praesumuntur legitime facta donec probetur in contrarium	all things are presumed to be lawfully done, until it is shown [to be] in the reverse	in other words, "innocent until proven guilty"
omnia sponte fluant absit violentia rebus	everything should flow by itself, force should be absent	"let it go"
omnia sunt communia	all things shall be held in common	from Acts of the Apostles
omnis vir enim sui	Every man for himself!	
omnibus idem	the same to all	motto of Pieter Corneliszoon Hooft, usually accompanied by a sun, which shines for (almost) everyone
omnibus locis fit caedes	There is slaughter everywhere (in every place)	Julius Caesar's The Gallic War, 7.67
omnis traductor traditor	every translator is a traitor	every translation is a corruption of the original; the reader should take heed of unavoidable imperfections
omnis vir tigris	everyone a tiger	motto of the 102nd Intelligence Wing
omnium gatherum	gathering of all	miscellaneous collection or assortment; "gatherum" is English, and the term is used often used facetiously
onus probandi	burden of proof	
onus procedendi	burden of procedure	burden of a party to adduce evidence that a case is an exception to the rule
opera omnia	all works	collected works of an author
opera posthuma	posthumous works	works published after the author's death
operari sequitur esse	act of doing something follows the act of being	scholastic phrase, used to explain that there is no possible act if there is not being: being is absolutely necessary for any other act
opere citato (op. cit.)	in the work that was cited	used in academic works when referring again to the last source mentioned or used
opere et veritate	in action and truth	doing what you believe is morally right through everyday actions
opere laudato (op. laud.)		See opere citato
operibus anteire	leading the way with deeds	to speak with actions instead of words
ophidia in herba	a snake in the grass	any hidden danger or unknown risk
opinio juris sive necessitatis	an opinion of law or necessity	a belief that an action was undertaken because it was a legal necessity; source of customary law
opus anglicanum	English work	fine embroidery, especially used to describe church vestments
Opus Dei	The Work of God	Catholic organisation
ora et labora	pray and work	This principle of the Benedictine monasteries reads in full: "Ora et labora (et lege), Deus adest sine mora." "Pray and work (and read), God is there without delay" (or to keep the rhyme: "Work and pray, and God is there without delay")
ora pro nobis	pray for us	"Sancta Maria, mater Dei, ora pro nobis peccatoribus"; Brazilian name for Pereskia aculeata
orando laborando	by praying, by working	motto of Rugby School
oratio recta	direct speech	expressions from Latin grammar
oratio obliqua	indirect speech	expressions from Latin grammar
oratio pro domo	speech for [one's own] house	also abbreviated pro domo; speak on one's own behalf; based on a speech by Cicero in legal proceedings in 57 AD to regain his house on the Palatine Hill that was confiscated during his exile
orbis non sufficit	the world does not suffice or the world is not enough	from Satires of Juvenal (Book IV/10), referring to Alexander the Great; James Bond's adopted family motto in the novel On Her Majesty's Secret Service; it made a brief appearance in the film adaptation of the same name and was later used as the title of the nineteenth James Bond film, The World Is Not Enough.
orbis unum	one world	seen in The Legend of Zorro
ordo ab chao	out of chaos, comes order	one of the oldest mottos of Scottish Rite Freemasonry.
(oremus) pro invicem	(Let us pray), one for the other; let us pray for each other	Popular salutation for Roman Catholic clergy at the beginning or ending of a letter or note. Usually abbreviated OPI. ("Oremus" used alone is just "let us pray").
orta recens quam pura nites	newly risen, how brightly you shine	Motto of New South Wales
os magna sonaturum	a mouth destined to speak great utterances	from Horace in Satires 1.4.43–44
