= Memento Mori (Aephanemer album) =

Studio album by Aephanemer
- Released: 16 September 2016
- Genres: Melodic death metal, folk metal
- Length: 53:34

Aephanemer chronology
| Memento Mori (2016) | Prokopton (2019) |

Singles from Memento Mori
- 1. "The Call of the Wild" Released: 7 August 2016; 2. "Unstoppable" Released: 9 September 2016

Professional ratings
Review scores
| Source | Rating |
|---|---|
| Dead Rhetoric | 8.5/10 |
| Metal Temple | 10/10 |
| New Noise Magazine | 4/5 |

Memento Mori is the debut studio album by French melodic death metal band Aephanemer, released on 16 September 2016. Mixing and mastering was done by Maciej Dawidek, while the album artwork was provided by Niklas Sundin.

== Track listing ==
All lyrics are written by Marion Bascoul; all music is composed by Martin Hamiche.

| No. | Title | Length |
|---|---|---|
| 1. | "Unstoppable" | 5:41 |
| 2. | "Sisyphus' Bliss" | 3:52 |
| 3. | "Hellebore" | 6:17 |
| 4. | "The Oathsworn" | 7:21 |
| 5. | "Ghosts" | 1:13 |
| 6. | "Rage and Forgiveness" | 5:43 |
| 7. | "The Call of the Wild" | 5:12 |
| 8. | "Crows" | 4:26 |
| 9. | "Memento Mori" | 6:21 |
| 10. | "Gilgamesh" | 7:28 |

== Personnel ==
- Marion Bascoul – vocals, rhythm guitar
- Martin Hamiche – lead guitar
- Lucie Woaye Hune – bass guitar
- Mickaël Bonnevialle – drums
