= Norbert Finzsch =

German historian

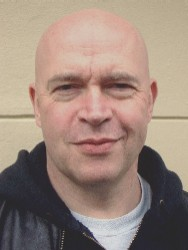
Finzsch in 2013

Norbert Finzsch (born 1951 in Cologne, Germany) as Norbert Rollewitz is a German historian.

== Education and career ==
Norbert Finzsch studied German literature and United States history at the University of Cologne, where he passed the state exam in both majors in 1977. In 1980 he received his PhD in history at Cologne. The title of the dissertation was The Gold miners of California: Conditions of Work, Standards of Living, and Political System in the Middle of the Nineteenth Century. It was a cliometric study. From 1981 to 1988 Finzsch taught American History as an assistant professor at the University of Cologne. In 1983/1984 he was a fellow of the American Council of Learned Societies at the University of California, Berkeley. In 1988 Finzsch passed his Habilitation (qualification for a professorship) and award of the Venia Legendi (right to teach) with a study of the social history of the Rhineland during the late 18th and early 19th century. In 1990 Finzsch was appointed deputy director of the German Historical Institute in Washington, D.C. In 1992 he received the chair of Modern History at the University of Hamburg as the successor of Günter Moltmann. He went to the University of Cologne in 2001 as Professor for North-American History. His research interests encompass the social history of the United States in the 19th and 20th centuries, the history of gender and sexuality and, since 2001, Australian history. From 2005 to 2007 Finzsch served as vice president of the University of Cologne. Between 1996 and 2000 Finzsch received several fellowships at the Berkeley, both at the Center for German and European Studies and the Center for International Government Studies. 2000/2001 he served as a visiting professor at the Université Michel Montaigne at Bordeaux, 2003 as visiting scholar at the Humanities Research Centre at the Australian National University in Canberra, Australia. 2012/13 Finzsch was appointed distinguished visiting scholar at Berkeley. 2014/2015 he was received a fellowship at the International Research Center re:work at the Humboldt University in Berlin. In 2016, Finzsch retired. In 2017, he received the Meyer-Struckmann-Prize of the Heinrich-Heine-University in Düsseldorf, Germany. Currently, he teaches at the Sigmund Freud University in Berlin as professor of psychotherapy science.

== Research ==
Finzsch began his career as a quantifying social historian of the US and Germany. Influenced by the linguistic turn and post-structuralist theory, he became a cultural historian, focusing on African American history, the history of penitentiaries, and the history of sexualities. At the end of the 1990s, Finzsch broadened his interests by researching the history of genocides and female genital mutilation in Western Europe between 1600 and 1950. Since 2020, he has been researching the history of ethnopsychiatry, with a special focus on Georges Devereux, Louis Mars, and Frantz Fanon.

== Selected works ==
Monographs

- Die Goldgräber Kaliforniens. Arbeitsbedingungen, Lebensstandard und politische System um die Mitte des 19. Jahrhunderts (= Kritische Studien zur Geschichtswissenschaft. Bd. 53). Vandenhoeck & Ruprecht, Göttingen 1982, ISBN 3-525-35711-7.
- Obrigkeit und Unterschichten. Zur Geschichte der rheinischen Unterschichten gegen Ende des 18. und zu Beginn des 19. Jahrhunderts. F. Steiner, Stuttgart 1990, ISBN 3-515-05459-6.
- with Hartmut Lehmann: Zukunftsvisionen. Politische und soziale Utopien in Deutschland und den Vereinigten Staaten im 20. Jahrhundert. Mit einem Beitrag von Wolf Biermann (Die Krefelder deutsch-amerikanische Tagung von 1999). Hrsg. von Stadt Krefeld, Oberstadtdirektor, Krefeld 2001, ISBN 3-9806517-5-4.
- with James Oliver Horton and Lois E. Horton: Von Benin nach Baltimore. Die Geschichte der African Americans. Hamburger Edition, Hamburg 1999, ISBN 3-930908-49-2.
- Konsolidierung und Dissens. Nordamerika von 1800 bis 1865 (= Geschichte Nordamerikas in atlantischer Perspektive von den Anfängen bis zur Gegenwart. Bd. 5). Lit, Münster u. a. 2005, ISBN 3-8258-4441-2.
- Der Widerspenstigen Verstümmelung: Eine Geschichte der Kliteridektomie im „Westen“, 1500-2000. Bielefeld: Transcript, 2021, ISBN 978-3-8376-5717-3.
- Abjekte Körper: Zur Kulturgeschichte der Monstrositäten, 1500-2023. Bielefeld: Transcript, 2024 ISBN 978-3-8376-7448-4.

Edited Books

- with Hermann Wellenreuther: Liberalitas: Festschrift für Erich Angermann zum 65. Geburtstag. F. Steiner, Stuttgart 1992, ISBN 3-515-05656-4.
- with Robert Jütte: Institutions of Confinement. Hospitals, Asylums, and Prisons in Western Europe and North America. 1500–1950. Cambridge University Press, Cambridge u. a. 1996, ISBN 0-521-56070-5.
- with Jürgen Martschukat: Reconstruction und Wiederaufbau in Deutschland und den Vereinigten Staaten von Amerika. 1865, 1945 und 1989 (= Krefelder Hefte zur deutsch-amerikanischen Geschichte. Bd. 2). Steiner, Stuttgart 1996, ISBN 3-515-06857-0.
- with Jürgen Martschukat: Different Restorations: Reconstruction and „Wiederaufbau“ in Germany and the United States, 1865, 1945, and 1989. Berghahn, Providence/Oxford 1996, ISBN 1-57181-086-2.
- with Dietmar Schirmer: Identity and Intolerance: Nationalism, Racism, and Xenophobia in Germany and the United States. Cambridge University Press, Cambridge u. a. 1998, ISBN 0-521-59158-9.
- with Hermann Wellenreuther: Visions of the Future in Germany and America. Berg, Oxford/New York 2001, ISBN 1-85973-521-5.
- with Ursula Lehmkuhl: Atlantic Communications. The Media in American and German History from the Seventeenth to the Twentieth Century. Berg, Oxford u. a. 2004, ISBN 1-85973-679-3.
- Clios Natur. Vergleichende Aspekte der Umweltgeschichte (= Studien zur Geschichte, Politik und Gesellschaft Nordamerikas. Bd. 28). Lit, Berlin u. a. 2008, ISBN 978-3-8258-1224-9.
- with Stefanie Coché: Religion und Politik in den Vereinigten Staaten von Amerika. 1760 bis 2011 (= Studien zur Geschichte, Politik und Gesellschaft Nordamerikas. Bd. 29). Lit, Berlin u. a. 2012, ISBN 978-3-643-11430-3.
- with Eva Bischoff und Ursula Lehmkuhl: Provincializing the United States: Colonialism, Decolonization, and (Post)Colonial Governance in Transnational Perspective. Winter, Heidelberg 2014, ISBN 978-3-8253-6360-4.
- with Krzysztof Ruchniewicz: Die Gestrichenen: Der Entzug der wissenschaftlichen Titel durch die Schlesische Friedrich-Wilhelms-Universität zu Breslau in den Jahren 1933-1945. Oficyna Wydawnicza Atut – Wrocławskie Wydawnictwo Oświatowe, Wrocław 2015, ISBN 978-83-7977-088-5.
- with Marcus Velke: Queer | Gender | Historiographie. Aktuelle Tendenzen und Projekte (= Geschlecht – Kultur – Gesellschaft. Gender – Culture – Society. Bd. 20). Lit, Münster/Berlin 2016, ISBN 978-3-643-13219-2.
