= Symphony No. 64 (Haydn) =

1773–1775 symphony by Joseph Haydn

- Tempora mutantur
- by Joseph Haydn
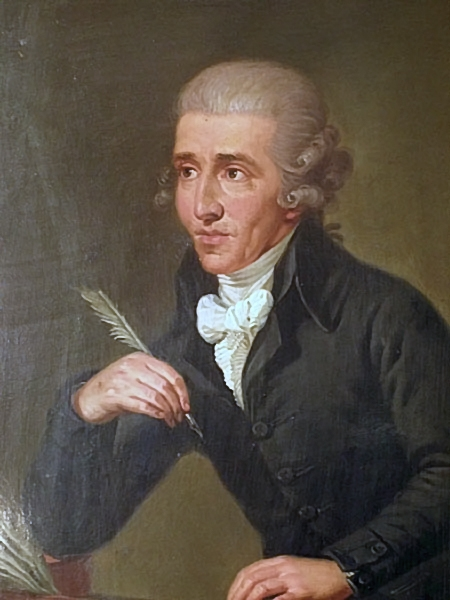
- Portrait of Joseph Haydn, ca. 1770
- Key: A major
- Catalogue: Hob. I:64
- Composed: 1773-75
- Duration: c. 20 minutes
- Movements: 4
- Scoring: Orchestra

The Symphony No. 64 in A major, Hoboken I/64, is a symphony by Joseph Haydn dated between 1773 and 1775. The likely date of composition puts it at the tail end of the Sturm und Drang period that produced masterpieces such as symphonies 44 to 48. It is often known by the nickname Tempora mutantur.

A typical performance lasts roughly 20 minutes.

== Nickname ==
The nickname Tempora mutantur is Haydn's own. On the orchestra parts prepared for this symphony at Esterházy, he placed the heading Tempora mutantur, et.". The full version of this Latin adage is Tempora mutantur, nos et mutamur in illis.

Haydn likely knew this in the form, Tempora mutantur, nos et mutamur in illis. Quomodo? Fit semper tempore peior homo., which translates to "Times change, and we change with them. How? Time passing makes mankind worse." by John Owen, from his popular collection of Epigrammata published in 1615.

== Movements ==
The symphony is scored for two oboes, two horns, and strings.

There are four movements:

1. Allegro con spirito, 4/4
2. Largo, 3/4
3. Menuetto and Trio: Allegretto, 3/4
4. Finale: Presto, 2/2

The opening of the first movement begins with two lyrical measures played pianissimo followed by a tutti outburst of four chords which is the reverse order of the declamatory question/lyrical answer openings that Haydn had used in recent symphonies such as nos. 44, 46 and 65. A wealth of transitional material follows before the second theme arrives in the dominant key, colorfully scored for violins and violas played in octaves. High horn parts add brilliant color appear throughout the movement.

The Largo as so often in this period has muted strings. Its broad melody is punctuated by frequent short pauses, demonstrating an understated pleading and yearning quality which is so typical of Haydn. We are tricked into thinking the movement is for strings alone until the wind instruments interject powerfully half way through. The end of the movement is particularly effective with the first horn right at the bottom of its register and the second horn taking the melody from the violins. The mood changes to light and cheerful for the minuet and trio, while the final Presto is in the form of a rondo.

Elaine Sisman has discussed Haydn's application of the principle of tempora mutantur, or "time out of joint", in the slow movement of the symphony.

== See also ==
- List of symphonies with names
