= O tempora, o mores! =

Exclamation by Cicero, most famously in first Catilinarian oration

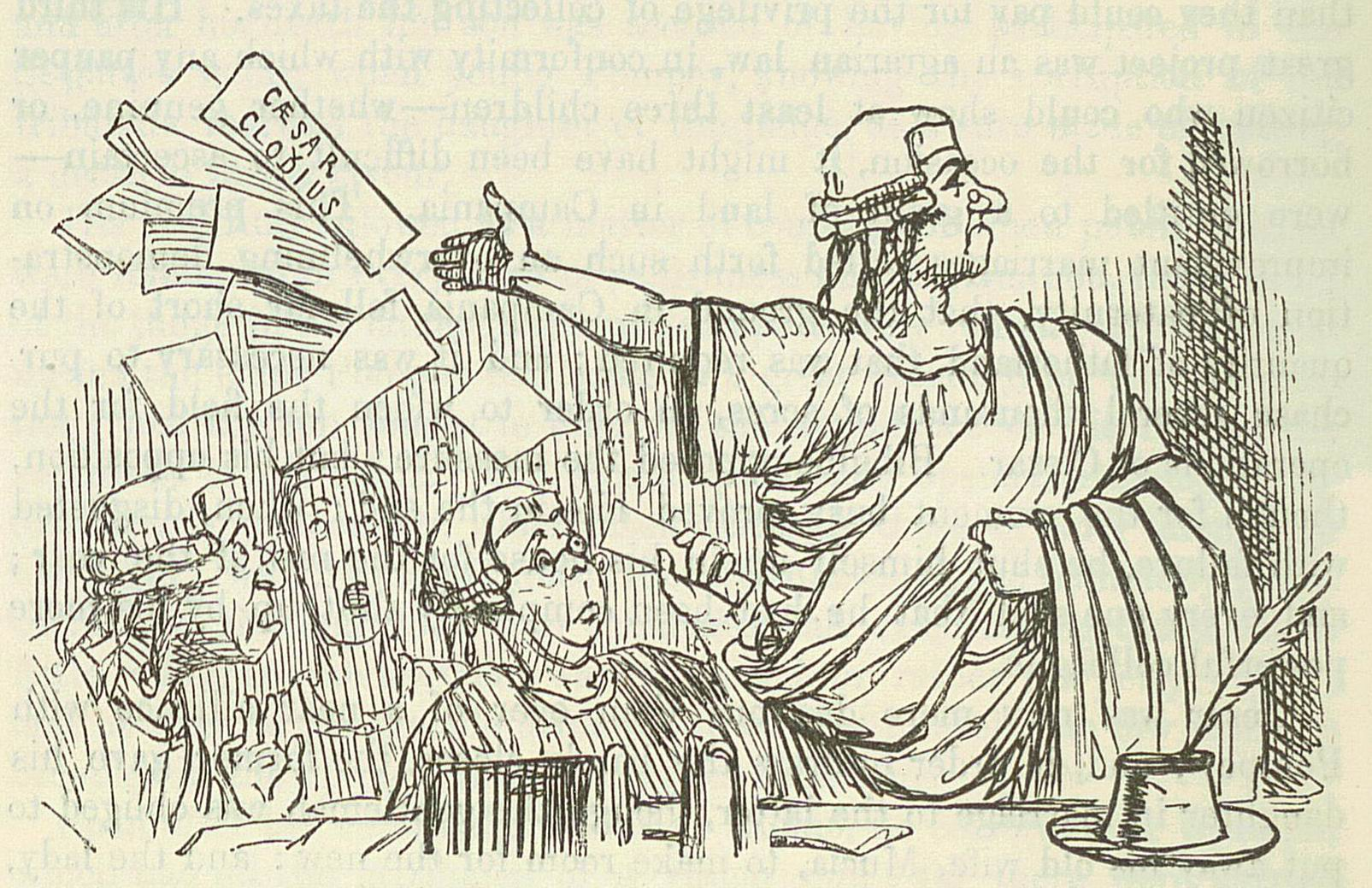
Cicero throws up his brief like a Gentleman, by John Leech, from: The Comic History of Rome by Gilbert Abbott à Beckett.

O tempora o mores is a Latin phrase meaning 'Oh the times, oh the customs', spoken by Roman politician Marcus Tullius Cicero as a lament of the modern world. It is frequently quoted to cry out against political corruption and moral decline.

The phrase 'o tempora o mores' appears in four of Cicero's extant speeches, and most famously in the opening of his First Oration against Catiline. In this speech, delivered in 63 BCE during Cicero's consulship (i.e. his twelve-month term as head of state of the Roman Republic), Cicero denounces his fellow senator and political opponent Lucius Sergius Catilina (Catiline), accuses Catiline of high treason and exposes the Catilinarian Conspiracy to assassinate the consuls, overthrow the government, and burn the city of Rome.

o tempora o mores! senatus hæc intellegit, consul videt; hic tamen vivit. vivit? immo vero etiam in senatum venit, fit publici consili particeps, notat et designat oculis ad cædem unum quemque nostrum. nos autem fortes viri satis facere rei publicæ videmur, si istius furorem ac tela vitamus.

Oh the times, oh the customs! The senate apprehends this all, the consul sees it; yet that man is living. Living? Nay, truthfully he even comes into the senate, takes part in public council, notes and marks with his eyes each and every one of us for slaughter. We however, brave men, do seem to do enough for the Republic if we dodge the rage and missiles of that man.

— Cicero. In Catilinam. 1.1.2 (Latin)

Cicero here takes a tone of righteous indignation. He expresses disappointment that Catiline, whom his oration presents as an exemplar of moral perversion and an existential threat to Rome, still lives and walks free; and he rebukes the senate for their actions, deemed by him weak and inept, in a time of national emergency. Emphatically, he does not exclude himself from this rebuke ('consul videt'; repetition of we in 'nostrum. nos'). He goes on to shame himself explicitly and agonise over his 'inaction'. In a classic example of appeal to tradition, Cicero will compare himself and the senate unfavourably to a litany of cases in Roman history where conspirators were executed on lesser evidence, such as former consul Lucius Opimius' execution of Gaius Sempronius Gracchus (one of the Gracchi brothers) in 122 BCE, based only on 'mere suspicion of sedition'.

== Cultural references ==
'O tempora o mores' gained wide renown during the classical period, being quoted for example in Seneca the Elder's Suasoriae:

tuis verbis, Cicero, utendum est: 'o tempora! o mores!' videbis ardentes crudelitate simul ac superbia oculos!

It is necessary to use your words, Cicero: 'O times! O morals!' You will see eyes burning at the same time with cruelty and arrogance!

Martial's poem "To Caecilianus" (Epigrams §9.70) also makes reference to the First Catilinarian Oration:

dixerat 'o mores! o tempora!' Tullius olim,
sacrilegum strueret cum Catilina nefas

"O times! O manners!" was of old the cry of Tullius,
when Catiline was contriving his impious plot

The phrase still enjoys contemporary usage, often to criticise present-day attitudes and trends but sometimes is used humorously or wryly.

It was used as the title of an epigram on Joseph Justus Scaliger by the Welsh epigrammatist John Owen, in his popular Epigrammata, 1613 Lib. I. epigram 16 O Tempora! O Mores!:

Scaliger annosi correxit tempora mundi:
Quis iam, qui mores corrigat, alter erit?

Translated by Harvey, 1677, as:

"Learn’d Scaliger The Worlds deformed Times
Reformed: Who shall Now reform Mens Crimes?"

Even in the eighteenth century it began being used this way: an aquatint print of 1787 by Samuel Alken after Thomas Rowlandson in the British Royal Collection entitled O Tempora, O Mores! shows two old men surprised to find three young drunk men who had fallen asleep together at a table.

Edgar Allan Poe used the phrase as the title and subject of his poem, "O, Tempora! O, Mores!" (≈1825), in which he criticized the manners of the men of his time. It is pronounced by a drunken poet in the 1936 movie Mr. Deeds Goes to Town. The expression is used in both the play (1955) and movie (1960) Inherit the Wind, a fictional account of the Scopes Trial, in which it is uttered by the cynical reporter, Hornbeck, referring to the town's attitude towards Darwin's theory of evolution.

The musical comedians Flanders and Swann used the term when Flanders proclaimed "O tempora, O mores – Oh Times, Oh Daily Mirror!" (1964). It is also one of several Latin phrases found in Asterix and Obelix comics published in the 1960s and 1970s. The phrase is also used in the Doctor Who serial, The Romans (1964).

In November 2014, senator Ted Cruz of Texas used the opening of Cicero's First Catilinarian Oration on the U.S. Senate floor, with only a few words changed, to criticize President Barack Obama's use of executive orders. In his version of the speech, which followed the translation of Charles Duke Yonge, senator Cruz rendered the phrase O tempora! O mores! as "Shame on the age and on its lost principles!"; and in place of Catiline, then-President Obama.

== See also ==
- Catiline Orations
- In Verrem
- Ecphonesis
- Mores
- Tempora mutantur
