= Utopie =

Studio album by Aephanemer
- Released: 31 October 2025
- Genres: Melodic death metal, symphonic death metal
- Length: 50:40
- Label: Napalm Records

Aephanemer chronology
A Dream of Wilderness (2021)	Utopie (2025)

Singles from Utopie
- 1. "La Règle du Jeu" Released: 30 August 2025; 2. "Le Cimetière Marin" Released: 29 September 2025; 3. "Contrepoint" Released: 2 November 2025

Professional ratings
Review scores
Source	Rating
Dead Rhetoric	8.5/10
Distorted Sound	8/10

Utopie (French for "Utopia") is the fourth studio album by French melodic death metal band Aephanemer, released on 31 October 2025 via Napalm Records. Music video were released for the singles "La Règle du Jeu", "Le Cimetière Marin", and "Contrepoint". The band embarked on a European tour to promote the album in November and December 2025, supported by Dark Oath, Valhalore, and Waldgefluster. After bassist Laure Begue left, the bass part was played by guitarist Martin Hamiche for this album. The lyrics to the album are written entirely in French, taking influence from French culture. The clean vocals sparsely used by vocalist Marion Bascoul were eschewed altogether.

== Track listing ==
All lyrics are written by Marion Bascoul; all music is composed by Martin Hamiche.

No.	Title	Length
1.	"Échos d'un monde perdu" ("Echoes of a Lost World")	1:17
2.	"Le cimetière marin" ("The Marine Cemetery")	5:29
3.	"La règle du jeu" ("The Rules of the Game")	3:52
4.	"Par-delà le mur des siècles" ("Beyond the Wall of Centuries")	5:13
5.	"Chimère" ("Chimera")	4:21
6.	"Contrepoint" ("Counterpoint")	4:30
7.	"La rivière souterraine" ("The Underground River")	8:28
8.	"Utopie: 1. "Partie I" (7:55); 2. "Partie II" (9:35); "	17:30

== Personnel ==
- Marion Bascoul – vocals, rhythm guitar
- Martin Hamiche – lead guitar, bass guitar, orchestrations
- Mickaël Bonnevialle – drums
