= A Dream of Wilderness =

Studio album by Aephanemer
- Released: 19 November 2021
- Genres: Melodic death metal, symphonic death metal
- Length: 42:00
- Label: Napalm Records

Aephanemer chronology
Prokopton (2019)	A Dream of Wilderness (2021)	Utopie (2025)

Singles from A Dream of Wilderness
- 1. "Panta Rhei" Released: 16 September 2021; 2. "Antigone" Released: 27 October 2021; 3. "Le Radeau de La Méduse" Released: 17 November 2021

Professional ratings
Review scores
Source	Rating
Dead Rhetoric	8.5/10
Distorted Sound	7/10
GBHBL	9/10
Metal Storm	8.2/10
Metal1.info	8.5/10
Sonic Perspectives	9/10

A Dream of Wilderness is the third studio album by French melodic death metal band Aephanemer, released on 19 November 2021 via Napalm Records. It was mixed by Dan Swanö and mastered by Mika Jussila. The cover art was drawn by Niklas Sundin.

== Track listing ==
All lyrics are written by Marion Bascoul; all music is composed by Martin Hamiche.

No.	Title	Length
1.	"Land of Hope"	1:30
2.	"Antigone"	4:10
3.	"Of Volition"	4:43
4.	"Le Radeau de La Méduse"	5:42
5.	"Roots and Leaves"	7:23
6.	"Vague à l'âme"	1:34
7.	"Strider"	5:15
8.	"Panta Rhei"	5:27
9.	"A Dream of Wilderness"	6:16

Digital edition bonus tracks
No.	Title	Length
1.	"Old French Song (Pyotr Ilyich Tchaikovsky cover)" (also in physical edition)	2:27
2.	"Le Radeau de La Méduse (French version)" (also in physical edition)	5:42
3.	"Antigone (instrumental version)"	4:10
4.	"Of Volition (instrumental version)"	4:43
5.	"Le Radeau de La Méduse (instrumental version)"	5:42
6.	"Roots and Leaves (instrumental version)"	7:23
7.	"Strider (instrumental version)"	5:15
8.	"Panta Rhei (instrumental version)"	5:27
9.	"A Dream of Wilderness (instrumental version)"	6:16

== Personnel ==
- Marion Bascoul – vocals, rhythm guitar
- Martin Hamiche – lead guitar
- Lucie Woaye Hune – bass guitar
- Mickaël Bonnevialle – drums
