= Aephanemer =

French melodic death metal band

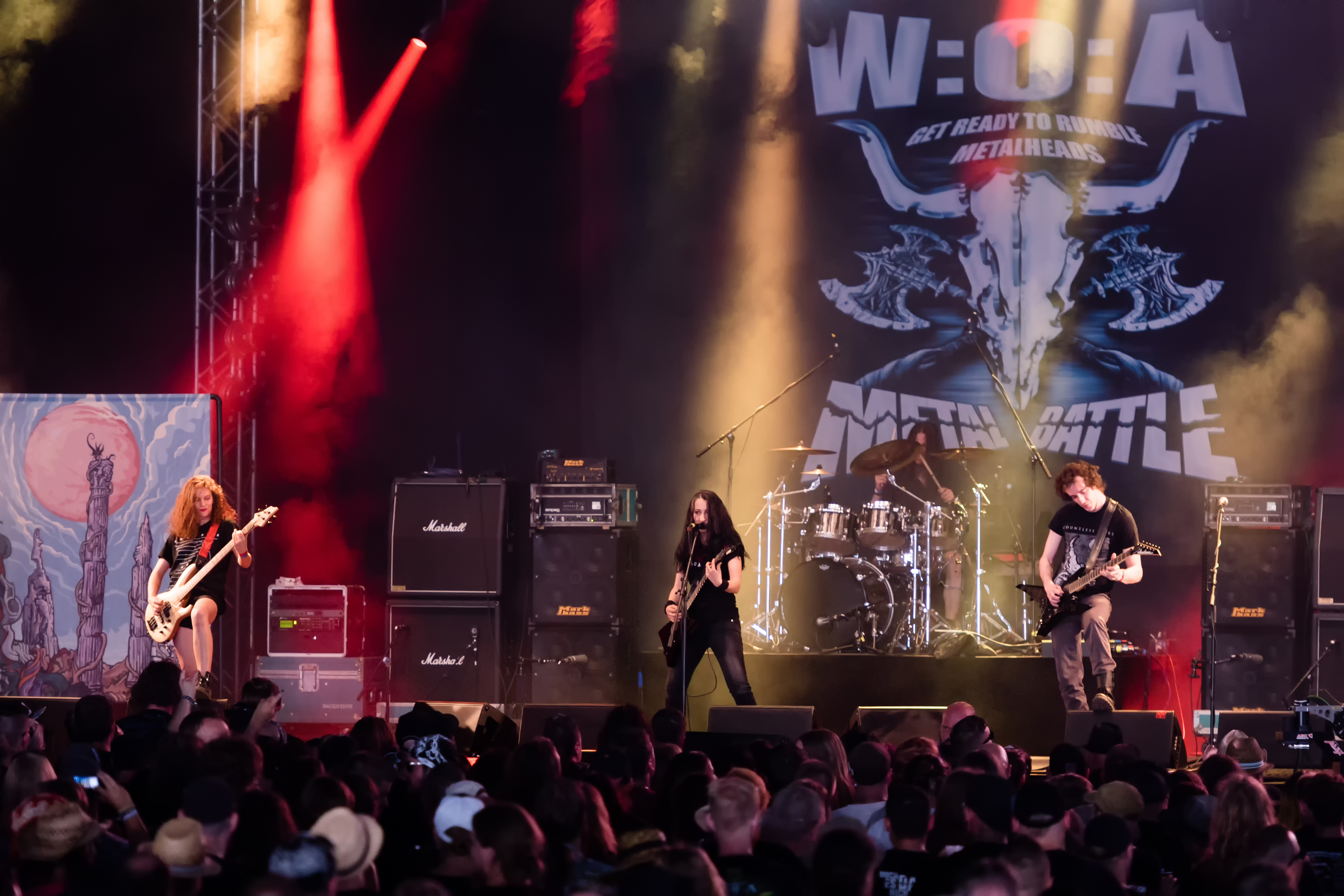
- Aephanemer at Wacken Open Air, 2018

Background information
- Origin: Toulouse, France
- Genres: Melodic death metal, symphonic death metal
- Years active: 2013–present
- Labels: Napalm Records, Primeval Records
- Members: Martin Hamiche; Marion Bascoul; Mickaël Bonnevialle; Florian Ménard
- Past members: Anthony Delmas; Lucie Woaye-Hune; Laure Begue
- Website: www.aephanemer.com

Aephanemer (/ɛfænəmɛə/) is a French melodic death metal band founded in 2013 in Toulouse. Their current lineup is Martin Hamiche on lead guitar, Marion Bascoul on vocals and rhythm guitar, Mickaël Bonnevialle on drums, and Florian Ménard on bass. Aephanemer have released one EP and four studio albums.

== History ==
Martin Hamiche began Aephanemer as a solo project. Hamiche independently released an instrumental EP, Know Thyself, in January 2014. After that, he decided to expand his project into a full band, hiring his friend Anthony Delmas, as the band's bassist, Marion Bascoul as their singer and rhythm guitarist, and Mickaël Bonnevialle as their drummer. In September 2016, the band used this label to release their first full-length album, Memento Mori. Mixing and mastering was done by Maciej Dawidek, while the album artwork was provided by Niklas Sundin. Reception was generally positive; Nicholas Senior wrote in a review for New Noise Magazine that “Aside from some weaker closing tracks, the band’s debut is a real achievement. They have carved out their own sound and have written an album that is almost entirely engaging.”

In March 2019, the band released their second album, Prokopton, again on Primeval Records. It was mixed by Dan Swanö and mastered by Mika Jussila. The cover art was again drawn by Sundin. Reviews were positive: Dan McHugh of Distorted Sound described Prokopton as exhibiting "an enjoyable slab of easily accessible tracks", while João Osório wrote for The Black Planet that it was "must have for fans of epic melodic death metal with more aggressive vocals". Shortly after release, the band signed with the label Napalm Records; Napalm arranged to re-release Prokopton in October 2019. In November 2019, the band joined Scottish metal band Alestorm's Canadian tour as the supporting act.

In November 2021, the band released their third album, A Dream of Wilderness. Once again, mixing was provided by Swanö and album artwork by Sundin. In January 2024, the band took on a new bassist, Laure Begue, replacing Lucie Woaye-Hune. Begue played on their 2024 European tour.

After Begue left, the band remained without a dedicated bassist while recording their fourth album, Utopie, so the bass part was instead played by Hamiche. In June 2025, Florian Ménard was hired to perform the role of bassist. In October 2025, Utopie was released.

== Musical style and influences ==
The band's music is described as "folkish symphonic melodeath." A review of Memento Mori observed that "Aephanemer's sound takes influence from Dark Tranquillity, Wintersun, and Children of Bodom.

Multiple reviewers have also noted folk, classical, and black metal influences of varying degrees across the four albums.

As is typical in melodic death metal, Bascoul's primary vocal style is growling. She made limited use of clean vocals on Prokopton and A Dream of Wilderness; however, in Utopie, she eschewed clean vocals altogether.

== Members ==
=== Current members ===
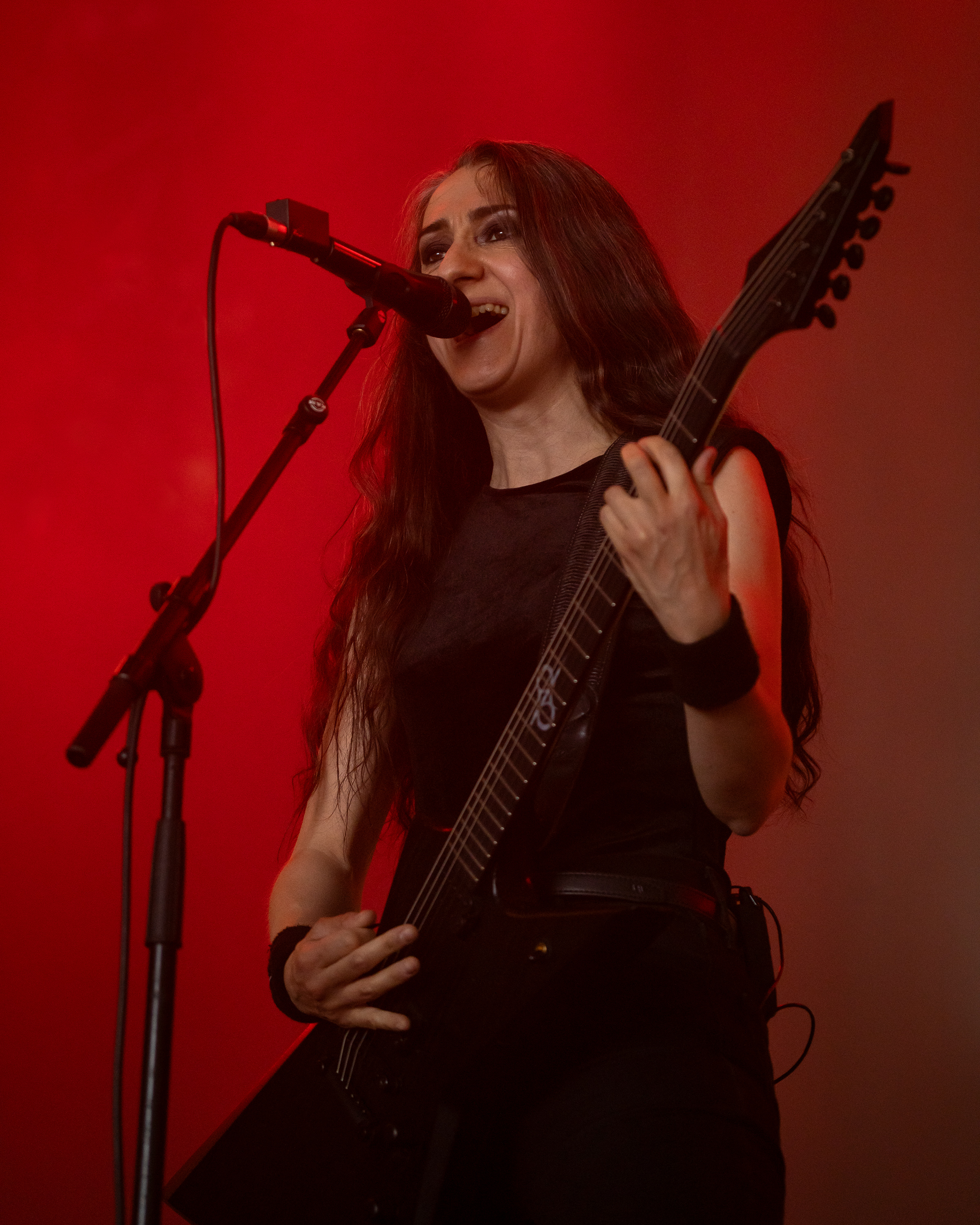
Marion Bascoul at Hellfest 2023.

- Martin Hamiche – all instruments (2013–2014), lead guitar (2013–present)
- Marion Bascoul – vocals, rhythm guitar (2014–present)
- Mickaël Bonnevialle – drums (2014–present)
- Florian Ménard – bass (2025–present)

=== Former members ===
- Anthony Delmas – bass (2014–2017)
- Lucie Woaye-Hune – bass (2017–2023)
- Laure Begue – bass (2024)

== Discography ==
=== Albums ===
- Memento Mori (2016, Primeval Records)
- Prokopton (2019, Primeval Records)
- A Dream of Wilderness (2021, Napalm Records)
- Utopie (2025, Napalm Records)

=== EPs ===
- Know Thyself (2014, independent)

=== Singles/music videos ===
- 2016: Unstoppable, from Memento Mori, directed by Cédric Gleyal
- 2017: Memento Mori, from Memento Mori, directed by Cédric Gleyal
- 2017: Path of the Wolf, from Know Thyself
- 2019: Bloodline, from Prokopton, directed by Cédric Gleyal
- 2019: The Sovereign, from Prokopton, directed by Cédric Gleyal
- 2021: Panta Rhei, from A Dream Of Wilderness, directed by Cédric Gleyal
- 2021: Antigone, from A Dream Of Wilderness, directed by Cédric Gleyal
- 2021: Panta Rhei, from A Dream Of Wilderness, directed by Cédric Gleyal
- 2025: La Règle du Jeu, from Utopie, directed by Matthieu Gill
- 2025: Contrepoint, from Utopie
