= John Owen (epigrammatist) =

Welsh epigrammatist (c. 1564 – 1622)

John Owen (c. 1564 – 1622) was a Welsh epigrammatist, most known for his Latin epigrams, collected in his Epigrammata.

He is also cited by various Latinizations including Ioannes Owen, Joannes Oweni, Ovenus and Audoenus.

== Life, education, and career ==
Owen was born at Plas Du, Llanarmon, Caernarfonshire (now Gwynedd), and was educated at Winchester College under Dr Thomas Bilson, and New College, Oxford, from where he graduated as Bachelor of Civil Law in 1590.

He was a fellow of his college from 1584 to 1591, when he became a schoolmaster, first at Trelleck, near Monmouth, and then of The King's School at Warwick around 1595. His salary was doubled to £20 per year in 1614.

Nicholas Poole-Wilson published a bibliography of his books in Trinity College in 2025 in an essay in The Book Collector.

On his death in 1622, Owen was buried in the old St Paul's Cathedral, London, memorialised with a Latin epitaph, thanks to his countryman and relative, Bishop John Williams of Lincoln, who is also said to have supported him in his later years.

== Epigrams ==
Owen became distinguished for his perfect mastery of the Latin language, and for the humour, felicity and point of his epigrams. His Latin epigrams, which have both sense and wit in a high degree, gained him much applause, and were translated into English, French, German, and Spanish.

Owen had started writing epigrams while at Winchester – indeed, education there was largely devoted to the production of them – and his were good enough by the time he reached 16 years of age to be used in a ceremony held when Queen Elizabeth I paid a state visit to Sir Francis Drake on his ship at Deptford, on his return from sailing around the world.

Owen started publishing his epigrams in 1606, whereupon they met with almost instant success throughout Europe, and the Continental scholars and wits of the day used to call him "the British Martial".

== Epigrammata ==
Owen's Epigrammata are divided into twelve books, of which the first three were published in 1606, and the rest at four different times (1607, 1612, c. 1613, 1620). Owen frequently adapts and alters to his own purpose the lines of his predecessors in Latin verse. His epigrams proved popular for centuries after his death, appearing in numerous reprints, editions and translations.

=== Books ===
The numbering of the books can be confusing. They were originally published as 10 books in 4 volumes, with books numbered from 1 in each volume. There are thus 4 books entitled "Book I", distinguished by whom they were dedicated to. Later editions collected all volumes in one, numbering the books sequentially. Books XI and XII are later additions, in the 1620 Leipzig edition.

Book XI is a collection of 128 moralising epigrams, titled Monosticha Quaedam Ethica et Politica Veterum Sapientum, and are not due to Owen: they are from the Disticha de Moribus of Michel Verino.

Book XII is a collection of fragments by Owen.

The original 4 volumes are:

1. Ioannis Audoeni Epigrammatum libri III, London, 1606 (dedicated to Lady Mary Neville, reprinted twice in 1607)
2. Epigrammatum Ioannis Owen…liber singularis, London, 1607 (dedicated to Lady Arabella Stuart)
3. Epigrammatum Ioannis Owen…Libri Tres, London, 1612 (the first two Books dedicated to Henry, Prince of Wales, the third Book dedicated to Charles, Duke of York)
4. Epigrammatum Joannis Owen…libri Tres, London, 1613 (?) (three Books, dedicated respectively to Sir Edward Noel, Sir William Sedley, and Sir Roger Owen)

=== Tempora mutantur ===
The most popular of his epigrams is a variant of the traditional Tempora mutantur nos et mutamur in illis. ("Times change, and we change with them.") Owen's version reads in full:

"Tempora mutantur, nos et mutamur in illis:
Quomodo? fit semper tempore pejor homo.” "How's that? The man (mankind) always gets worse with time"

— (Lib. I. ad Edoardum Noel, epig. 58.)

The popularity of his Epigrammata means that this adage is at times attributed to him, and Joseph Haydn likely nicknamed his Symphony No. 64 Tempora mutantur based on Epigrammata.

=== Editions and translations ===
There are editions of the Epigrammata by Elzevir and by Didot; the best is that edited by Renouard (2 vols., Paris, 1795).

Translations into English, either in whole or in part, were made by John Vicars in Epigrams of that most wittie and worthie epigrammatist Mr. Iohn Owen, Gentleman (1619); by Robert Hayman, whose book Quodlibets(1628) included epigrams by Owen; by Thomas Pecke, in his Parnassi Puerperium (1659); and by Thomas Harvey in The Latine epigrams of John Owen (1677), which is the most complete. La Torre, the Spanish epigrammatist, owed much to Owen, and translated his works into Spanish in 1674. French translations of the best of Owen's epigrams were published by A. L. Lebrun (1709) and by Kerivalant (1819). Epic and Epigrams (1997) by David R. Slavitt contains translations of 60 of Owen's epigrams.

=== Conflict with the Roman Catholic Church ===
He was a staunch Protestant, and could not resist the temptation of turning his wit against the Roman Catholic Church, which resulted in Epigrammata being placed on the Index Librorum Prohibitorum in 1654, and lead to his uncle Hugh Owen, a recusant involved in the Ridolfi plot, to cut him out of his will.
