= Omnia munda mundis =

Latin sentence

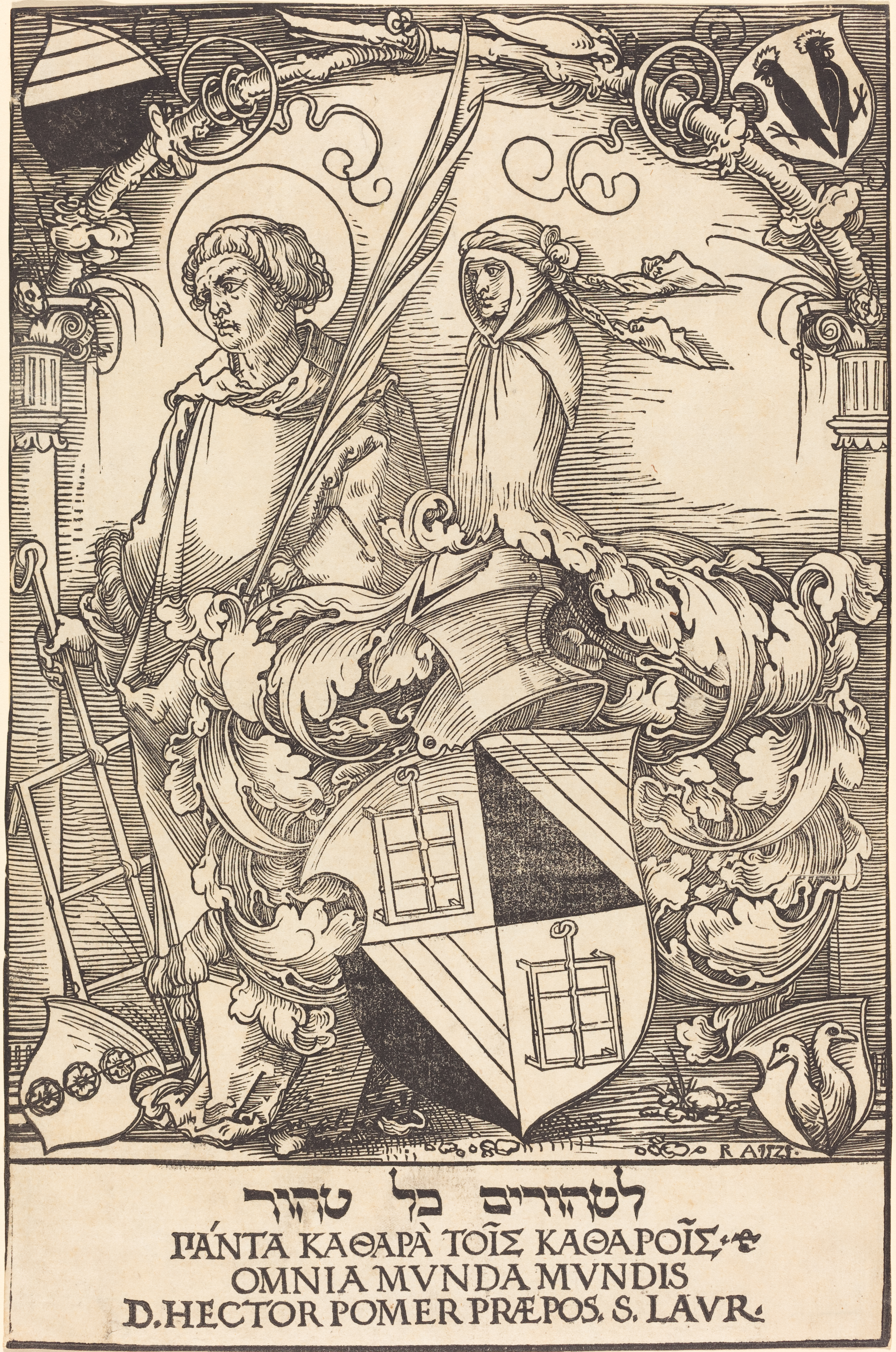
"Omnia munda mundis" on a woodcut of 1525.

Omnia munda mundis, literally meaning "to the pure [men], all things [are] pure", is a Latin sentence that has entered a relatively common usage in many countries. The phrase is from the Latin translation of the New Testament:

"Omnia munda mundis; coinquinatis autem et infidelibus nihil mundum, sed inquinatae sunt eorum et mens et conscientia"
("To the pure all things are pure; but to those who are defiled and unbelieving nothing is pure, but both their mind and their conscience are defiled").

In Chapter VIII of The Betrothed by Alessandro Manzoni the sentence is pronounced by Father Cristoforo in relation to the stunned attitude of Friar Fazio at the arrival of Renzo and the other threatened (among whom two women, Lucia and her mother, Agnese):

When they were inside, Father Cristoforo very softly shut the door. Then the sexton could no longer contain himself, and, taking the Father aside, whispered in his ear: - but Father, Father! at night… in church… with women… shut… the rule… but Father! - And he shook his head. While he hesitatingly pronounced these words, «just see!» thought Father Cristoforo, «if it were a pursued robber, Friar Fazio would make no difficulty in the world; and a poor innocent, escaping from the jaws of a wolf…» —Omnia munda mundis, — said then, turning suddenly to Friar Fazio, and forgetting that he did not understand Latin. But such a forgetfulness was exactly what produced the effect. If the Father had begun to dispute and reason, Friar Fazio would not have failed to urge opposing arguments; and heaven knows how and when the discussion would have come to an end; but, at the sound of those weighty words of a mysterious signification, and so resolutely uttered, it seemed to him that in them must be contained the solution of all his doubts. He acquiesced, and said: - that's enough! you know more about it than I do.

Due to this famous passage the sentence is sometimes erroneously credited to Alessandro Manzoni.
