= The Invisible Empire: The Ku Klux Klan in Florida =

2001 book by Michael Newton

- First edition cover
- Author: Michael Newton
- Language: English
- Subject: Ku Klux Klan
- Publisher: University Press of Florida
- Publication date: 2001
- Publication place: United States
- Media type: Print
- Pages: 260
- ISBN: 0-8130-2120-0
- OCLC: 47136480
- Dewey Decimal: 322.4
- LC Class: HS2330.K63 N485 2001

The Invisible Empire: The Ku Klux Klan in Florida is a 2001 book about the Ku Klux Klan by Michael Newton. It was published by the University Press of Florida in 2001. It received positive reviews and the Rembert Patrick Annual Book Award from the Florida Historical Society.

== Overview ==
A look into the so-called 'Invisible Empire' of Ku Klux Klan activity in Florida, beginning with the days of Reconstruction and ending at the present day.

== Publication history ==
It was published by the University Press of Florida in 2001.

== Reception ==
Paul Ortiz praised The Invisible Empire as an "excellent monograph", praising Newton's "careful attention to location, nuance, and change over time." G. Zuber for The Journal of Southern Religion said "the book represents one of the best and most concise overviews of Klan history and scholarship to date". William D. Jenkins called it a "thorough chronicling of the Florida Klan", noting it as one of the "Few books on the Ku Klux Klan [to] have chronicled its activities in a single state from Reconstruction to the present".

It received the Rembert Patrick Annual Book Award from the Florida Historical Society.
