= Klaus Larres =

German-born historian and political scientist

Klaus W. Larres is a German-born historian and political scientist, currently the Richard M. Krasno Distinguished Professor at University of North Carolina, and also an author. Larres was educated at the University of Cologne and the London School of Economics and Political Science.

He is currently a Global Europe and Kissinger China Institute Fellow at the Woodrow Wilson Center in Washington, DC.

Along with previously holding the Henry A. Kissinger Chair in Foreign Policy and International Relations at Library of Congress, he is a member of the Royal Historical Society, International Institute for Strategic Studies and American Academy of Political and Social Science. He also formerly served as a senior policy advisor at the German Embassy in Beijing.

Before moving to the US, Larres spent almost 18 years in the UK.

== Works ==
- Politik der Illusionen. Churchill, Eisenhower und die deutsche Frage 1945–1955. Göttingen 1995, ISBN 3-525-36320-6.
- The Federal Republic of Germany since 1949. Politics, society and economy before and after unification. London 1996.
- Germany since unification. The domestic and external consequences. Basingstoke 1998. ISBN 0-333-64981-8.
- Churchill's Cold War. The Politics of Personal Diplomacy. Yale 2006, ISBN 0-300-09438-8.
- The Cold War after Stalin's death. A missed opportunity for peace? (with Kenneth Osgood) Lanham 2006, ISBN 0-7425-5451-1.
- A companion to Europe since 1945. Oxford 2009, ISBN 1-405-10612-3.

== Sources ==
- Larres, Klaus (n.d.). "Biographical Note". Klaus Larres. Archived from the original on December 20, 2016.
- "Klaus W. Larres". Rondeli Security Conference. 2024.
