= Panta rhei (doctrine) =

Aphorism, "everything flows"

The formula panta rhei (Ancient Greek: πάντα ῥεῖ, meaning "everything flows") is an aphorism which describes Heraclitus' doctrine. Plato attributes this teaching to Heraclitus in his dialogue Cratylus, but the formula first appears in the work of the late antique Neoplatonist Simplicius. This formulaic summary of Heraclitus' thought was already in use in Augustan times. Its Latin translation (cuncta fluunt) can be found in the 15th book of Metamorphoses in the "Speech of Pythagoras", in which Ovid sets out the natural philosophical foundation of his Metamorphoses.

== Origin ==
Πάντα ῥεῖ is a formulaic summary of Heraclitus' thought, who flourished around 500BC. In his characterization of Heraclitus' cosmological theory, Plato has Socrates combine some of his best-known theorems: "Πάντα χωρεῖ καὶ οὐδὲν μένει", "everything moves and nothing stays" – with "all kinds of ancient wisdom, of course about Cronus and Rhea, which Homer had already said". He assumes that the name of the Titan, Rhea, can be traced back to the meaning of "to flow".

The phrase is first found in literal form in Simplicius (born 490 – 560), a late antique commentator on the writings of Aristotle.

== Flux doctrine ==
The fact that the phrase in the flux doctrine is an interpretation of Heraclitus' statements is not inaccurate, but nonetheless abbreviated. It is supported by three so-called "flux fragments", in which Heraclitus compares being with a river:

- Fragment B12 (in the Diels–Kranz numbering):

Ποταμοῖσι τοῖσιν αὐτοῖσιν ἐμβαίνουσιν ἕτερα καὶ ἕτερα ὕδατα ἐπιρρεῖ.
(You cannot step into the same river; for fresh waters are ever flowing in upon you.)

- Fragment 49a:

Ποταμοῖς τοῖς αὐτοῖς ἐμβαίνομέν τε καὶ οὐκ ἐμβαίνομεν, εἶμέν τε καὶ οὐκ εἶμεν.
(We step and do not step into the same rivers; we are and are not.)

- Fragment 91[a]:

Ποταμῷ οὐκ ἔστιν ἐμβῆναι δὶς τῷ αὐτῷ.
(You can't get into the same river twice.)

=== Literary analysis ===
Graham notes that only B12 has language which reflects other quotations from Heraclitus, and concludes that only B12 is genuine. Fragment 49a is in Attic Greek, not in Heraclitus' Ionic dialect, and B91[a] is "patently a paraphrase". Geoffrey Kirk and Miroslav Marcovich reach the same conclusion.

=== Philosophical interpretations ===
The flux doctrine is to be understood in the context of Heraclitus' doctrine of the unity of all things:

συνάψιες ὅλα καὶ οὐχ ὅλα, συμφερόμενον διαφερόμενον, συνᾷδον διᾷδον, καὶ ἐκ πάντων ἕν καὶ ἐξ ἑνὸς πάντα
(Couples are things whole and things not whole, what is drawn together and what is drawn asunder, the harmonious and the discordant. The one is made up of all things, and all things issue from the one.)

Plato's quote Pánta chorei kaì oudèn ménei is the most concise formulation of Heraclitus' theory of flux, which states: "Everything flows and nothing remains; there is only an eternal becoming and changing." Unlike Heraclitus himself, the focus here is on the aspect of becoming and passing away. In the tradition of the Platonic school, but also in numerous more recent interpretations (e.g. Hölderlin and Hegel), Heraclitus' teaching appears only as one of becoming and passing away. According to Nietzsche, it is essentially a concept of the "affirmation of passing away" (Bejahung des Vergehens).

In contrast, according to the theory of flux, the primary experience of the world lies in the continuous change of matter and form. It is a metaphor for the processuality of the world. Being is the becoming of the whole. Being is therefore not static, but is to be understood dynamically as eternal change. However, behind and at the same time in the incessant flux is unity: unity in multiplicity and multiplicity in unity. Karl-Martin Dietz nevertheless interprets the flux theory as Heraclitus' reference to the world of the unchangingly common.

== Reception by Goethe ==
Johann Wolfgang von Goethe referred directly to Heraclitus in the poem Dauer im Wechsel:

Gleich mit jedem Regengusse
Ändert sich dein holdes Tal,
Ach, und in demselben Flusse,
Schwimmst du nicht zum zweitenmal.

Eternal change is also the subject of his poem Eins und Alles:

Es soll sich regen, schaffend handeln,
Erst sich gestalten, dann verwandeln;
Nur scheinbar stehts Momente still.
Das Ewige regt sich fort in allen:
Denn alles muß in Nichts zerfallen,
Wenn es im Sein beharren will.

== See also ==
- List of ancient Platonists
- Natura non facit saltus
- Impermanence

== Literature ==
- Wilhelm Capelle: Die Vorsokratiker. Kröner, Stuttgart, 9. Auflage 2008, ISBN 978-3-520-11909-4
- Hans Joachim Störig: Kleine Weltgeschichte der Philosophie. Fischer, Frankfurt a. M. 1996, ISBN 978-3-596-13520-2
- Ute Seiderer (Hrsg.): Panta rhei. Der Fluß und seine Bilder. Ein kulturgeschichtliches Lesebuch. Reclam, Leipzig 1999, ISBN 978-3-379-01677-3
