= List of authors in the Executioner series =

The Executioner (a.k.a. Mack Bolan) is a monthly men's action-adventure paperback series of books. It has spanned several spin-offs and imitators over its four decades in print and currently has 423 installments (as of February 2014) that have sold more than 200 million copies. Created and initially written by American author Don Pendleton in 1969, who wrote 37 of the original 38 Bolan books (#16 was written by one "Jim Petersen" during a legal dispute between Pendleton and Pinnacle) before he licensed the rights to Gold Eagle in 1980. Since 1981, the series has been written collectively by a series of ghostwriters.

== Authors ==
Authors categorized into the decade in which they published their debut work.

=== 1969-1980 ===
#	Author	Titles published	Years active	Debut novel	Final novel	Notes of interest
1	Don Pendleton	38	1969–1980	#1: War Against The Mafia	#38: Satan's Sabbath	
2	Jim Peterson	1	1973	#16: Sicilian Slaughter	#16: Sicilian Slaughter	Pseudonym of William Crawford

=== 1981-1989 ===
#	Author	Titles published	Years active	Debut novel	Final novel	Notes of interest
3	Saul Wernick	1	1981	#39: The New War	#39: The New War	
4	Steven Krauzer	4	1982–1983	#40: Double Crossfire	#50: Brothers in Blood	
5	Mike Newton	78	1982–present	#41: The Violent Streets	N/A	
6	Stephen Mertz	11	1982–1986	#42: The Iranian Hit	#94: Save the Children	
7	Ray Obstfeld	4	1982–1986	#46: Bloodsport	#93: The Fire Eaters	
8	Patrick Neary	1	1983	#51: Vulture's Vengeance	#51: Vulture's Vengeance	
9	Alan Bomack	4	1983–1986	#53: Invisible Assassins	#87: Hellfire Crusade	Pseudonym of David Wade
10	E. Richard Churchill	2	1983	#54: Mountain Rampage	#56: Island Deathtrap	
11	Chet Cunningham	6	1983–1986	#59: Crude Kill	#88: Baltimore Trackdown	
12	Tom Jagninski	2	1984	#61: Tiger War	#65: Cambodia Clash	
13	Peter Leslie	8	1984–1990	#70: Ice Cold Kill	#143: Helldust Cruise	
14	Tom Arnett	2	1985–1986	#78: Death Games	#86: Hell's Gate	
15	James Lord	1	1985	#84: Fastburn	#86: Fastburn	
16	Dan Schmidt	23	1986–2006	#95: Blood and Thunder	#331: Assault Force	
17	Mike McQuay	23	1986–1988	#96: Death Has A Name	#116: The Killing Urge	
18	Charlie McDade	8	1987–1993	#97: Meltdown	#171: Deadly Force	
19	Kent Delaney	1	1987	#105: Countdown to Chaos	#105: Countdown to Chaos	
20	Kevin Randle	1	1988	#118: Warrior's Revenge	#118: Warrior's Revenge	
21	Kirk Sanson	4	1989–1990	#121: Twisted Path	#138: Kill Trap	
22	Jack Garside	1	1989	#122: Desert Strike	#122: Desert Strike	
23	Mel Odom	18	1989–2003	#123: War Born	#298: Final Play	
24	Carl Furst	8	1989–1992	#127: Kill Zone	#168: Blood Price	

=== 1990-1999 ===
#	Author	Titles published	Years active	Debut novel	Final novel	Notes of interest
25	Jerry Van Cook	32	1990–present	#139: Cutting Edge	N/A	
26	Roland J. Green	4	1991–1994	#145: Chicago Payoff	#183: Clean Sweep	
27	Rich Rainey	9	1991–2001	#146: Deadly Tactics	#275: Crossed Borders	
28	William Fieldhouse	6	1992–1999	#166: Assassin's Creed	#245: Virtual Destruction	
29	Ron Renauld	6	1992–2010	#167: Double Action	#381: Killing Ground	
30	David L. Robbins	9	1993–2005	#169: White Heat	#322: Time Bomb	
31	Mike Linaker	16	1993–present	#179: War Hammer	N/A	
32	Michael Kasner	2	1995–1997	#198: Shoot Down	#217: Fight or Die	
33	Rick Price	1	1995	#201: Prime Target	#201: Prime Target	
34	David North	4	1996–1998	#207: Freedom Strike	#232: Jackal Hunt	
35	Chuck Rogers	25	1996–present	#208: Death Whisper	N/A	
36	Tim Somheil	4	1996–2004	#215: Fire Hammer	#306: Mercy Mission	
37	Will Murray	1	1997	#226: Red Horse	#226: Red Horse	
38	Alan Philipson	4	1998–2000	#231: Slaughter Squad	#261: Dawnkill	
39	Mark Ellis	2	1998	#237: Hellfire Trigger	#240: Devil's Guard	

=== 2000-2009 ===
#	Author	Titles published	Years active	Debut novel	Final novel	Notes of interest
41	Jon Guenther	12	2000–present	#255: War Bird	#466: Chicago Vendetta	
42	Gerald Montgomery	4	2000–2001	#262: Trigger Point	#276: Leviathan	
43	Douglas P. Wojtowicz	11	2003–present	#291: Blood Trade	#N/A	
44	Tim Tresslar	4	2003–present	#293: Death Merchants	#N/A	
45	Andy Boot	6	2003–present	#299: Dangerous Encounter	#N/A	
46	Nathan Meyer	4	2007–present	#341: Rebel Force	#N/A	
47	Peter Spring	3	2007–2008	#345: Orange Alert	#356: Defense Breach	
48	Phil Elmore	9	2007–present	#345: Orange Alert	N/A	
49	Russell Davis	6	2009–present	#371: Fire Zone	N/A	
50	Keith DeCandido	2	2009–2010	#373: Code of Honor	#379: Deep Recon	

=== 2010-present ===
#	Author	Titles published	Years active	Debut novel	Final novel	Notes of interest
51	Darwin Holmstrom	2	2010–2011	#373: Code of Honor	#379: Deep Recon	
52	Travis Morgan	2	2011–2012	#393: Stand Down	#401: Jungle Hunt	
53	Joshua Reynolds	1	2012	#408: Border Offensive	#408: Border Offensive	
54	Michael A. Black	1	2013–present	#419: Sleeping Dragons	N/A	
55	Nick Pollotta	1	2014	#423: Breakout	#423: Breakout	Published posthumously.
