= List of Mack Bolan books =

The Executioner is a monthly action-adventure paperback book series created by American author Don Pendleton. Every other month the series was complemented by the release of a "Super Bolan", titles that were twice the length of a standard Executioner novel. Following the exploits of Mack Bolan and his war against organized crime and international terrorism, both series collectively total 642 novels (464 regular Executioner titles, plus 178 Super Bolan titles). The series ceased publication in 2020.

- The list below only covers up to the year 2003. For a list of the later titles, go to and scroll down to bottom of article.

== Don Pendleton era (1969–1980) ==
#	Release date	Titles	Author
1	1969	War Against the Mafia	Don Pendleton
2	1969	Death Squad	Don Pendleton
3	1970	Battle Mask	Don Pendleton
4	1970	Miami Massacre	Don Pendleton
5	1971	Continental Contract	Don Pendleton
6	1971	Assault on Soho	Don Pendleton
7	1971	Nightmare in New York	Don Pendleton
8	1971	Chicago Wipe-Out	Don Pendleton
9	1971	Vegas Vendetta	Don Pendleton
10	1972	Caribbean Kill	Don Pendleton
11	1972	California Hit	Don Pendleton
12	1972	Boston Blitz	Don Pendleton
13	1972	Washington I.O.U.	Don Pendleton
14	1972	San Diego Siege	Don Pendleton
15	1973	Panic in Philly	Don Pendleton
16	1973	Sicilian Slaughter	Jim Peterson
17	1974	Jersey Guns	Don Pendleton
18	1974	Texas Storm	Don Pendleton
19	1974	Detroit Deathwatch	Don Pendleton
20	1974	New Orleans Knockout	Don Pendleton
21	1975	Firebase Seattle	Don Pendleton
22	1975	Hawaiian Hellground	Don Pendleton
23	1975	St. Louis Showdown	Don Pendleton
24	1975	Canadian Crisis	Don Pendleton
25	1976	Colorado Kill-Zone	Don Pendleton
26	1976	Acapulco Rampage	Don Pendleton
27	1976	Dixie Convoy	Don Pendleton
28	1977	Savage Fire	Don Pendleton
29	1977	Command Strike	Don Pendleton
30	1977	Cleveland Pipeline	Don Pendleton
31	1977	Arizona Ambush	Don Pendleton
[none]	1977	The Executioner's War Book (trade paperback)	Don Pendleton
32	1978	Tennessee Smash	Don Pendleton
33	1978	Monday's Mob	Don Pendleton
34	1979	Terrible Tuesday	Don Pendleton
35	1979	Wednesday's Wrath	Don Pendleton
36	1979	Thermal Thursday	Don Pendleton
37	1979	Friday's Feast	Don Pendleton
38	1980	Satan's Sabbath	Don Pendleton

== 1980s ==
=== Gold Eagle transition period (April 1981 – December 1982) ===
#	Release date	Titles	Author
39	April 1981	The New War	Saul Wernick
40	January 1982	Double Crossfire	Steven Krauzer
41	February 1982	The Violent Streets	Don Pendleton
42	May 1982	The Iranian Hit	Stephen Mertz
43	July 1982	Return to Vietnam	Stephen Mertz
44	August 1982	Terrorist Summit	Steven Krauzer
45	September 1982	Paramilitary Plot	Mike Newton
46	October 1982	Bloodsport	Ray Obstfeld
47	November 1982	Renegade Agent	Steven Krauzer
48	December 1982	The Libya Connection	Don Pendleton

=== 1983 ===
Executioner				SuperBolan		
#	Release date	Titles	Author	#	Title	Author
49	January	Doomsday Disciples	Mike Newton			
50	February	Brothers in Blood	Steven Krauzer			
51	March	Vulture's Vengeance	Patrick Neary			
52	April	Tuscany Terror	Stephen Mertz			
53	May	The Invisible Assassins	Alan Bomack			
54	June	Mountain Rampage	E. Richard Churchill	1	Stony Man Doctrine	G.H. Frost
55	July	Paradine's Gauntlet	Mike Newton			
56	August	Island Deathtrap	E. Richard Churchill			
57	September	Flesh Wounds	Ray Obstfeld			
58	October	Ambush on Blood River	Alan Bomack			
59	November	Crude Kill	Chet Cunningham			
60	December	Sold for Slaughter	Mike Newton			

=== 1984 ===
Executioner				SuperBolan		
#	Release date	Titles	Author	#	Title	Author
61	January	Tiger War	Tom Jagninski			
62	February	Day of Mourning	Stephen Mertz			
63	March	The New War Book	Slade/Hill/Newton			
64	April	Dead Man Running	Stephen Mertz	2	Terminal Velocity	Alan Bomack
65	May	Cambodia Clash	Tom Jagninski			
66	June	Orbiting Omega	Chet Cunningham			
67	July	Beirut Payback	Stephen Mertz			
68	August	Prairie Fire	Mike Newton			
69	September	Skysweeper	Chet Cunningham			
70	October	Ice Cold Kill	Peter Leslie			
71	November	Blood Dues	Mike Newton			
72	December	Hellbinder	Chet Cunningham			

=== 1985 ===
Executioner				SuperBolan		
#	Release date	Titles	Author	#	Title	Author
73	January	Appointment in Kabul	Stephen Mertz			
74	February	Savannah Swingsaw	Ray Obstfeld	3	Resurrection Day	Chet Cunningham
75	March	The Bone Yard	Mike Newton			
76	April	Teheran Wipeout	Stephen Mertz			
77	May	Hollywood Hell	Mike Newton			
78	June	Death Games	Tom Arnett			
79	July	Council of Kings	Chet Cunningham			
80	August	Running Hot	Peter Leslie			
81	September	Shock Waves	Mike Newton			
82	October	Hammerhead Reef	Alan Bomack	4	Dirty War	Stephen Mertz
83	November	Missouri Deathwatch	Mike Newton			
84	December	Fastburn	James Lord			

=== 1986 ===
Executioner				SuperBolan			
#	Release date	Titles	Author	#		Title	Author
85	January	Sunscream	Peter Leslie				
86	February	Hell's Gate	Tom Arnett				
87	March	Hellfire Crusade	Alan Bomack				
88	April	Baltimore Trackdown	Chet Cunningham				
89	May	Defenders and Believers	Mike Newton	5		Flight 741	Mike Newton
90	June	Blood Heat Zero	Peter Leslie				
91	July	The Trial	Mike Newton				
92	August	Moscow Massacre	Stephen Mertz				
93	September	The Fire Eaters	Ray Obstfeld				
94	October	Save the Children	Stephen Mertz	6	'	Dead Easy	Peter Leslie
95	November	Blood and Thunder	Dan Schmidt				
96	December	Death Has a Name	Mike McQuay				

=== 1987 ===
Executioner				SuperBolan		
#	Release date	Titles	Author	#	Title	Author
97	January	Meltdown	Charlie McDade			
98	February	Black Dice	Dan Schmidt	7	Sudden Death	Peter Leslie
99	March	Code of Dishonor	Mike McQuay			
100	April	Blood Testament	Mike Newton			
101	May	Eternal Triangle	Mike Newton	8	Rogue Force	Mike Newton
102	June	Split Image	Charlie McDade			
103	July	Assault on Rome	Mike Newton			
104	August	Devil's Horn	Dan Schmidt	9	Tropic Heat	Charlie McDade
105	September	Countdown to Chaos	Kent Delaney			
106	October	Run to Ground	Mike Newton			
107	November	American Nightmare	Mike McQuay			
108	December	Time to Kill	Mike Newton			

=== 1988 ===
Executioner				SuperBolan			
#	Release date	Titles	Author	#		Title	Author
109	January	Hong Kong Hit List	Peter Leslie	10	January	Fire in the Sky	Mike McQuay
110	February	Trojan Horse	Dan Schmidt				
111	March	The Fiery Cross	Mike Newton	11	March	Anvil of Hell	Peter Leslie
112	April	Blood of the Lion	Dan Schmidt				
113	May	Vietnam Fallout	Charlie McDade				
114	June	Cold Judgment	Mike Newton	12	June	Flash Point	Charlie McDade
115	July	Circle of Steel	Dan Schmidt				
116	August	The Killing Urge	Mike McQuay				
117	September	Vendetta in Venice	Peter Leslie	13	September	Flesh and Blood	Mike Newton
118	October	Warrior's Revenge	Kevin Randle				
119	November	Line of Fire	Mike Newton				
120	December	Border Sweep	Charlie McDade				

=== 1989 ===
Executioner				SuperBolan			
#	Release date	Titles	Author	#		Title	Author
121	January	Twisted Path	Kirk Sanson	14	January	Moving Target	Gayle Stone, Mark Sadler
122	February	Desert Strike	Jack Garside				
123	March	War Born	Mel Odom				
124	April	Night Kill	Mike Newton	15	April	Tight Rope	Carl Furst
125	May	Dead Man's Tale	Peter Leslie				
126	June	Death Wind	Mel Odom				
127	July	Circle of Steel	Dan Schmidt	16	July	Kill Zone	Carl Furst
128	August	Sudan Slaughter	Kirk Sanson				
129	September	Haitian Hit	Mike Newton				
130	October	Dead Line	Carl Furst	17	October	Blood Fever	Gayle Stone, Mark Sadler
131	November	Ice Wolf	Mel Odom				
132	December	The Big Kill	Charlie McDade				

== 1990s ==
=== 1990 ===
Executioner				SuperBolan			
#	Release date	Titles	Author	#		Title	Author
133	January	Blood Run	Mike Newton				
134	February	White Line War	Kirk Sanson	18	February	Knockdown	Carl Furst
135	March	Devil Force	Mel Odom				
136	April	Down and Dirty	Carl Furst				
137	May	Battle Lines	Peter Leslie	19	May	Assault	Mike Newton
138	June	Kill Trap	Kirk Sanson				
139	July	Cutting Edge	Jerry VanCook				
140	August	Wild Card	Mel Odom				
141	September	Direct Hit	Carl Furst	20	September	Backlash	Charlie McDade
142	October	Fatal Error	Mike Newton				
143	November	Helldust Cruise	Peter Leslie				
144	December	Whipsaw	Charlie McDade	21	December	Siege	Mel Odom

=== 1991 ===
Executioner				SuperBolan			
#	Release date	Titles	Author	#		Title	Author
145	January	Chicago Payoff	Roland Green				
146	February	Deadly Tactics	Rich Rainey				
147	March	Payback Game	Jerry VanCook	22	March	Blockade	Carl Furst
148	April	Deep and Swift	Carl Furst				
149	May	Blood Rules	Mike Newton				
150	June	Death Load	Charlie McDade	23	June	Evil Kingdom	Mel Odom
151	July	Message to Medellin	Mike Newton				
152	August	Combat Stretch	Jerry VanCook	24	August	Counterblow	Charlie McDade
153	September	Firebase Florida	Carl Furst				
154	October	Night Hit	Mel Odom				
155	November	Hawaiian Heat	Mike Newton				
156	December	Phantom Force	Rich Rainey	25	December	Hardline	Peter Leslie

=== 1992 ===
Executioner				SuperBolan			
#	Release date	Titles	Author	#		Title	Author
157	January	Cayman Strike	Jerry VanCook				
158	February	Firing Line	Roland Green				
159	March	Steel and Flame	Carl Furst	26	March	Firepower	Ron Renauld
160	April	Storm Warning	Mel Odom				
161	May	Eye of the Storm	Mel Odom				
162	June	Colors of Hell	Mike Newton	27	June	Storm Burst	Jerry VanCook
163	July	Warrior's Edge	Rich Rainey				
164	August	Death Trail	Jerry VanCook	28	August	Intercept	Carl Furst
165	September	Fire Sweep	Mike Newton				
166	October	Assassin's Creed	William Fieldhouse				
167	November	Double Action	Ron Renauld				
168	December	Blood Price	Carl Furst	29	December	Lethal Impact	Mike Newton

=== 1993 ===
Executioner				SuperBolan			
#	Release date	Titles	Author	#		Title	Author
169	January	White Heat	David Robbins				
170	February	Baja Blitz	Mike Newton	30	February	Deadfall	Charlie McDade
171	March	Deadly Force	Charlie McDade				
172	April	Fast Strike	Mel Odom				
173	May	Capitol Hit	Roland Green	31	May	Onslaught	Jerry VanCook
174	June	Battle Plan	Jerry VanCook				
175	July	Battle Ground	Herry VanCook				
176	August	Ransom Run	Rich Rainey	32	August	Battle Force	Mel Odom
177	September	Evil Code	William Fieldhouse				
178	October	Black Hand	David Robbins				
179	November	War Hammer	Mike Linaker				
180	December	Force Down	Rich Rainey	33	December	Rampage	Ron Renauld

=== 1994 ===
Executioner				SuperBolan			
#	Release date	Titles	Author	#		Title	Author
181	January	Shifting Target	Ron Renauld				
182	February	Lethal Agent	Mel Odom	34	February	Takedown	Rich Rainey
183	March	Clean Sweep	Roland Green				
184	April	Death Warrant	Jerry VanCook	35	April	Death's Head	Roland Green
185	May	Sudden Fury	Mike Linaker				
186	June	Fire Burst	Mike Newton	36	June	Hellground	Mike Newton
187	July	Cleansing Flame	Mike Newton				
188	August	War Paint	Mel Odom	37	August	Inferno	Mel Odom
189	September	Wellfire	Jerry VanCook				
190	October	Killing Range	Mike Newton	38	October	Ambush	Jerry VanCook
191	November	Extreme Force	David Robbins				
192	December	Maximum Impact	Rich Rainey	39	December	Blood Strike	Mike Newton

=== 1995 ===
Executioner				SuperBolan			
#	Release date	Titles	Author	#		Title	Author
193	January	Hostile Action	Mike Linaker				
194	February	Deadly Contest	Mike Newton	40	February	Killpoint	Mel Odom
195	March	Select Fire	Mel Odom				
196	April	Triburst	Jerry VanCook	41	April	Vendetta	Mike Newton
197	May	Armed Force	Mel Odom				
198	June	Shootdown	Michael Kasner	42	June	Stalk Line	Jerry VanCook
199	July	Rogue Agent	David Robbins				
200	August	Crisis Point	Mike Newton	43	August	Omega Game	Mike Newton
201	September	Prime Target	Rick Price				
202	October	Combat Zone	William Fieldhouse	44	October	Shock Tactic	David Robbins
203	November	Hard Contact	Mike Linaker				
204	December	Rescue Run	Jerry VanCook	45	December	Showdown	Jerry VanCook

=== 1996 ===
Executioner				SuperBolan			
#	Release date	Titles	Author	#		Title	Author
205	January	Hell Road	Dan Schmidt				
206	February	Hunting Cry	Mike Newton	46	February	Precision Kill	David Robbins
207	March	Freedom Strike	David North				
208	April	Death Whisper	Chuck Roger	47	April	Jungle Law	Mike Newton
209	May	Asian Crucible	William Fieldhouse				
210	June	Fire Lash	Mike Newton	48	June	Dead Center	Mel Odom
211	July	Steel Claws	Mike Newton				
212	August	Ride the Beast	Mike Newton	49	August	Tooth and Claw	Mike McQuay
213	September	Blood Harvest	Mel Odom				
214	October	Fission Fury	David North	50	October	Red Heat	Jerry VanCook
215	November	Fire Hammer	Tim Somheil				
216	December	Death Force	Dan Schmidt	51	December	Thermal Strike	David Robbins

=== 1997 ===
Executioner				SuperBolan			
#	Release date	Titles	Author	#		Title	Author
217	January	Fight or Die	Michael Kasner				
218	February	End Game	Mike Linaker	52	February	Day of the Vulture	Mike McQuay
219	March	Terror Intent	Tim Somheil				
220	April	Tiger Stalk	David North	53	April	Flames of Wrath	William Fieldhouse
221	May	Blood and Fire	Chuck Rogers				
222	June	Patriot Gambit	Mike Newton	54	June	High Aggression	Tim Somheil
223	July	Hour of Conflict	Mike Newton				
224	August	Call to Arms	Mike Newton	55	August	Code of Bushido	Dan Schmidt
225	September	Body Armor	William Fieldhouse				
226	October	Red Horse	Will Murray	56	October	Terror Spin	Mike Newton
227	November	Blood Circle	Chuck Rogers				
228	December	Terminal Option	Dan Schmidt	57	December	Judgment in Stone	Rich Rainey

=== 1998 ===
Executioner				SuperBolan			
#	Release date	Titles	Author	#		Title	Author
229	January	Zero Tolerance	Mike Newton				
230	February	Deep Attack	David Robbins	58	February	Rage for Justice	Tim Somheil
231	March	Slaughter Squad	Alan Philipson				
232	April	Jackal Hunt	David North	56	April	Rebels and Hostiles	Michael Kasner
233	May	Tough Justice	Mike Newton				
234	June	Target Command	Chuck Rogers	60	June	Ultimate Game	Alan Philipson
235	July	Plague Wind	Chuck Rogers				
236	August	Vengeance Rising	Chuck Rogers	61	August	Blood Feud	David Robbins
237	September	Hellfire Trigger	Mark Ellis				
238	October	Crimson Tide	Mel Odom	62	October	Renegade Force	Dan Schmidt
239	November	Hostile Proximity	Tim Somheil				
240	December	Devil's Guard	Mark Ellis	63	December	Retribution	Jerry VanCook

=== 1999 ===
Executioner				SuperBolan			
#	Release date	Titles	Author	#		Title	Author
241	January	Evil Reborn	Dan Schmidt				
242	February	Doomsday Conspiracy	Dan Schmidt	64	February	Initiation	Mike Newton
243	March	Assault Reflex	Dan Schmidt				
244	April	Judas Kill	Rich Rainey	65	April	Cloud of Death	Mike Newton
245	May	Virtual Destruction	William Fieldhouse				
246	June	Blood of the Earth	Chuck Rogers	66	June	Termination Point	Mike Newton
247	July	Black Dawn Rising	Mike Linaker				
248	August	Rolling Death	Dan Schmidt	67	August	Hellfire Strike	David North
249	September	Shadow Target	Mike Newton				
250	October	Warning Shot	Jerry VanCook	68	October	Code of Conflict	David Robbins
251	November	Kill Radius	Jerry VanCook				
252	December	Death Line	Jerry VanCook	69	December	Vengeance	Mike Newton

== 2000s ==
=== 2000 ===
Executioner				SuperBolan			
#	Release date	Titles	Author	#		Title	Author
253	January	Risk Factor	Dan Schmidt				
254	January	Chill Effect	Chuck Rogers	70	January	Executive Action	David North
255	February	War Bird	Jon Guenther				
256	March	Point of Impact	Dan Schmidt	71	March	Killsport	Mike Newton
257	April	Precision Play	Jerry VanCook				
258	May	Target Lock	Mike Newton	72	May	Conflagration	Tim Somheil
259	June	Nightfire	Alan Philipson				
260	July	Dayhunt	Alan Philipson	73	July	Storm Front	Rich Rainey
261	August	Dawnkill	Alan Philipsonn				
262	September	Trigger Point	Gerald Montgomery	74	September	War Season	Dan Schmidt
263	October	Skysniper	Chuck Rogers				
264	November	Iron Fist	Gerald Montgomery	75	November	Evil Alliance	David Robbins
265	December	Freedom Force	Jerry VanCook				

=== 2001 ===
Executioner				SuperBolan			
#	Release date	Titles	Author	#		Title	Author
266	January	Ultimate Price	Gerald Montgomery	76	January	Scorched Earth	Dan Schmidt
267	February	Invisible Invader	David Robbins				
268	March	Shattered Trust	Mike Newton	77	March	Deception	Jon Guenther
269	April	Shifting Shadows	Mike Newton				
270	May	Judgment Day	Mike Newton	78	May	Destiny's Hour	Mike Newton
271	June	Cyberhunt	Jon Guenther				
272	July	Stealth Striker	Dan Schmidt	79	July	Power of the Lance	Rich Rainey
273	August	UForce	Rich Rainey				
274	September	Rogue Target	Jerry VanCook	80	September	A Dying Evil	Mike Newton
275	October	Crossed Borders	Rich Rainey				
276	November	Leviathan	Gerald Montgomery	81	November	Deep Treachery	Dan Schmidt
277	December	Dirty Mission	Mike Newton				

=== 2002 ===
Executioner				SuperBolan			
#	Release date	Titles	Author	#		Title	Author
278	January	Triple Reverse	Jerry VanCook	82	January	War Load	David Robbins
279	February	Fire Wind	Dan Schmidt				
280	March	Fear Rally	Jon Guenther	83	March	Sworn Enemies	Ron Renauld
281	April	Blood Stone	Mike Newton				
282	May	Jungle Conflict	Jerry VanCook	84	May	Dark Truth	Dan Schmidt
283	June	Ring of Retaliation	Jerry VanCook				
284	July	Devil's Army	Dan Schmidt	85	July	Breakaway	Chuck Rogers
285	August	Final Strike	Dan Schmidt				
286	September	Armageddon Exit	Dan Schmidt	86	September	Blood and Sand	Dan Schmidt
287	October	Rogue Warrior	Mike Newton				
288	November	Arctic Blast	Jon Guenther	87	November	Caged	Michael Kasner
289	December	Vendetta Force	Jerry VanCook				

=== 2003 ===
Executioner				SuperBolan			
#	Release date	Titles	Author	#		Title	Author
290	January	Pursued	Mike Newton	88	January	Sleepers	Mike Newton
291	February	Blood Trade	Douglas P. Wojtowicz				
292	March	Savage Game	Chuck Rogers	89	March	Strike and Retrieve	Ron Renauld
293	April	Death Merchants	Tim Tresslar				
294	May	Scorpion Rising	David Robbins	90	May	Age of War	David Robbins
295	June	Hostile Alliance	Jerry VanCook				
296	July	Nuclear Game	Mel Odom	91	July	Line of Control	Jon Guenther
297	August	Deadly Pursuit	Mel Odom				
298	September	Final Play	Mel Odom	92	September	Breached	Jon Guenther
299	October	Dangerous Encounter	Andy Boot				
300	November	Warrior's Requiem	Mike Newton	93	November	Retaliation	Mike Newton
301	December	Blast Radius	Chuck Rogers				
