= Bill Crider =

American novelist

- Born: July 28, 1941; Mexia, Texas, U.S.
- Died: February 12, 2018 (aged 76); Alvin, Texas, U.S.
- Education: University of North Texas (MA); University of Texas at Austin (PhD)
- Occupation: Writer
- Writing career
- Pen name: Jack MacLane, Jack Buchanan, Nick Carter
- Period: 1986–2018
- Genres: Mystery, western, horror, children's
- Website: www.billcrider.com

Bill Crider (July 28, 1941 – February 12, 2018) was an American author of crime fiction among other work.

== Biography ==
Crider received a Master of Arts degree at the University of North Texas, in Denton. Later, he taught English at Howard Payne University for twelve years, before earning a Ph.D. degree at the University of Texas at Austin, where he wrote a dissertation on the hardboiled detective novel. Crider then moved to Alvin, Texas, with his wife, where he was the Chair of the Division of English and Fine Arts at Alvin Community College. He retired in August 2002 to become a full-time writer.

Crider was the author of the Professor Sally Good and the Carl Burns mysteries, the Sheriff Dan Rhodes series, the Truman Smith P.I. series, and wrote three books in the Stone: M.I.A. Hunter series under the pseudonym "Jack Buchanan". He was also the writer of several westerns and horror novels.

== Personal life and death ==
Crider had two children, Angela Crider Neary and Allen Crider, with his wife of 49 years Judy (née Stutts, 1943–2014).

Crider died at his home in Alvin, Texas, on February 12, 2018, of cancer, at the age of 76.

== Bibliography ==
=== Mystery novels ===
==== Sheriff Dan Rhodes series ====
- Too Late to Die (Walker, 1986; Ivy, 1989) – (Winner of the 1987 Anthony Award for Best First Novel)
- Shotgun Saturday Night (Walker, 1987; Ivy, 1989)
- Cursed to Death (Walker, 1988; Ivy, 1990)
- Death on the Move (Walker, 1989; Ivy, 1990)
- Evil at the Root (St. Martin's, 1990; Ivy, 1991)
- Booked for a Hanging (St. Martin's, 1992)
- Murder Most Fowl (St. Martin's, 1994)
- Winning Can Be Murder (St. Martin's, 1996; Worldwide, 2000)
- Death by Accident (St. Martin's Press, April 1998, ISBN 0-312-18080-2; Worldwide, 2000)
- A Ghost of a Chance (St Martins Press, July 2000, ISBN 0-312-20889-8; Worldwide, October 2001)
- A Romantic Way to Die (St. Martins Press, November 2001)
- Red, White, and Blue Murder (St. Martin's Press, October 2003)
- The Empty Manger (Worldwide, November 2001) – novella included in the collection Murder, Mayhem, and Mistletoe
- A Mammoth Murder (St. Martin's Press, April 2006)
- Murder Among the O.W.L.S. (St. Martin's Press, January 2007)
- Of All Sad Words (St. Martin's Press, February 2008)
- Murder in Four Parts (St. Martin's Press, February, 2009)
- Murder in the Air (St. Martin's Press, August, 2010)
- The Wild Hog Murders (St. Martin's Press, July, 2011)
- Murder of a Beauty Shop Queen (St. Martin's Press, August, 2012)
- Compound Murder (St. Martin's Press, August, 2013)
- Half in Love with Artful Death (St. Martin's Press, August, 2014)
- Between the Living and the Dead (St. Martin's Press, August, 2015)
- Survivors Will Be Shot Again (St. Martin's Press, August, 2016)
- Dead, To Begin With (St. Martin's Press, August 2017)
- That Old Scoundrel Death (St. Martin's Press, February 2019)

==== Carl Burns series ====
- One Dead Dean (Walker, 1988)
- Dying Voices (St. Martin's, 1989)
- . . . A Dangerous Thing (Walker, 1994; Worldwide, 1996)
- Dead Soldiers (Five Star, June 2004)

==== Truman Smith series ====
- Dead on the Island ( Walker, 1991) – (Nominated for the Shamus Award for Best First Private Eye Novel)
- Gator Kill ( Walker, 1992)
- When Old Men Die (Walker, 1994)
- The Prairie Chicken Kill (Walker, 1996)
- Murder Takes a Break (Walker, 1996)

==== Stanley Waters series ====
(co-authored with Willard Scott)

- Murder under Blue Skies (Dutton, 1998; Onyx, 1999)
- Murder in the Mist (Dutton, 1999; Onyx, 2000)

==== Professor Sally Good series ====
- Murder Is An Art (St. Martin's, 1999)
- A Knife in the Back (St. Martin's, 2002)
- A Bond with Death (St. Martin's, 2004)

==== Stand-alone mystery and suspense novels ====
- Blood Marks (St. Martin's, 1991; Gold Medal, 1993)
- The Texas Capitol Murders (St. Martin's, 1992)
- We'll Always Have Murder: A Humphrey Bogart Mystery (iBooks, 2001) (intended as first of a Bogart series)
- Houston Homicide (with Clyde Wilson) (Five Star, December 2007)

=== House-name spy fiction ===
- The Coyote Connection (a Nick Carter book, in collaboration with Jack Davis) (Charter, 1981)

=== Western novels ===
- Ryan Rides Back (M. Evans, 1988)
- Galveston Gunman (M. Evans, 1989)
- A Time for Hanging (M. Evans, 1989)
- Medicine Show (M. Evans, 1990)
- Outrage at Blanco (Dell, 1999)
- Texas Vigilante (Dell, 1999)

=== Horror novels ===
(all published under the pseudonym "Jack MacLane")

- Keepers of the Beast (Zebra, 1988)
- Goodnight, MooM (Zebra, 1989)
- Blood Dreams (Zebra, 1989)
- Rest in Peace (Zebra, 1990)
- Just before Dark (Zebra, 1990)

=== Stone: M.I.A. Hunter series ===
(All published under the pseudonym "Jack Buchanan." The entire series was co-written with Stephen Mertz, Michael Newton, and Joe R. Lansdale.)

- Miami War Zone (Stone: MIA Hunter #10) (Jove, 1988)
- Desert Death Raid (Stone: MIA Hunter #12) (Jove, 1989)
- Back to 'Nam (Stone: MIA Hunter #14) (Jove, 1990)

=== Books for young readers ===
- A Vampire Named Fred (Temple Books, 1990)
- Muttketeer: A Wishbone Book (Big Red Chair Books, 1997)
- Mike Gonzo and the Sewer Monster (Minstrel, 1996)
- Mike Gonzo and the Almost Invisible Man (Minstrel, 1996)
- Mike Gonzo and the UFO Terror (Minstrel, 1997) – (winner of the 1997 Golden Duck Award for Best Juvenile SF Novel)

=== Short story collections ===
- The Nighttime is the Right Time (Five Star, 2000)
