= Death Merchant =

Titular fictional character and novel series

The Death Merchant is the title and lead character of a series of men's action-adventure books written by Joseph Rupert Rosenberger and published by Pinnacle Books from 1971 to 1988. Richard Joseph Camellion, as described in the books, is a master of disguise, the martial arts and wet-work. Cynical and lethal in equal measure, his normal employer was the CIA – at a cost of $100,000 a mission.

He is described on the back of the books as "Richard Camellion, master of death, destruction, and disguise. He gets the dirty jobs, the impossible missions, the operations that cannot be handled by the FBI, CIA, or any other legal or extra-legal force. He is a man without a face, without a single identifying characteristic...except that he succeeds by being a Merchant of Death!"

== Fictional character biography ==
According to information in #30, The Shambhala Strike, Camellion was born in St. Louis, Missouri. He keeps a ranch in Votaw, Texas, where he lives when not on a mission and has two pet pigs, known as Damon and Pythias. Two books, #30 The Shambhala Strike and #53 The Judas Scrolls mention Camellion studying at Saint Louis University, where he received a Bachelor of Science degree. It is stated in the former book that Camellion holds a degree in engineering from Washington University in St. Louis. Three other books (#1 The Death Merchant, #9 Laser Mission, #11 Manhattan Wipeout) mention that Camellion is an ex-teacher of history, but this may simply be a cover story.

Camellion is very interested in the occult and the prophecies of Nostradamus.

Camellion's father was in the hardware business (#13, The Mato Grosso Horror).

Camellion donates an unspecified percentage of his fees for each mission to assist struggling college students and also the underprivileged in Texas (#17, "The Zemlya Expedition").

The character uses at least one alias in every book. Examples: James Valdorian, Chester Giffwangle, Leonard Higgdon, Emil Milrich, Milton Sessions, Ludwig Huelsenbeck, Thomas Wang-Ji. On two occasions, when asked if Camellion is his real name, he replies that it does not matter. #63 The Soul Search Project reveals that Richard Joseph Camellion is not the name on his birth certificate.

In the first book, he is hired by the Mafia to kill an informant. In later books, he never works for organized crime again but accepts missions from the ONI (Office of Naval Intelligence), NSA, CIA and MAD (West German counter-intelligence)

The series is more nihilistic than many of its 1970s and 1980s action series counterparts; Camellion does not think twice about killing innocent people if it is the quickest way to get the mission accomplished. For example, #62, The Soul Search Project sees his team killing 18 New York Police Department officers who try to stop them during a mission. Another book series by Rosenberger, COBRA, features similar characters in this regard.

== The books ==
1. The Death Merchant – Richard Camellion versus the Chicago mob.

2. Operation Overkill – The demented leaders of the Knights of Vigilance plan to assassinate the President and overthrow the government.

3. The Psychotron Plot – The Russians and Egyptians team up to use a brain-scrambling device on Israel.

4. Chinese Conspiracy – The Chinese plan to maneuver a submarine into Canadian waters and shoot a US space shuttle out of the sky.

5. Satan Strike – The CIA and GRU combine forces to stop a dictator of a Caribbean nation from using a potent and deadly super-virus.

6. The Albanian Connection – Neo-Nazis, bent on reunifying Germany and restoring the Reich, have assembled seven nuclear bombs to use against the U.S., Europe, and Russia.

7. The Castro File – The Russians plan to gain complete control of Cuba by assassinating Castro and having a lookalike take his place.

8. The Billionaire Mission – Cleveland Winston Silvestter, a paranoid billionaire, believes he is Satan's chosen disciple and is hellbent on triggering World War III.

9. The Laser War – A Nazi super-laser is pursued.

10. The Mainline Plot – Communists in North Korea have created a super-potent, super-addictive strain of heroin called Peacock-4. By introducing the heroin into the U.S., they hope to enslave a generation of young adults.

11. Manhattan Wipeout – The Death Merchant causes trouble for the four mob families in New York City.

12. The KGB Frame – Flash! Camellion turns double agent. The target of both his colleagues and his enemies, the Death Merchant becomes the object of an intense manhunt in international espionage.

13. The Mato Grosso Horror – Camellion leads an expedition into the Brazilian jungle to locate a group of Nazis who are perfecting a mind-control drug.

14. Vengeance of the Golden Hawk – The DM is tasked with saving Tel Aviv from a rocket barrage containing a deadly nerve gas.

15. The Iron Swastika Plot – The Nazi organization known as the Spider returns!

16. Invasion of the Clones – Camellion versus five clones of himself in Africa.

17. The Zemlya Expedition – The Death Merchant attempts to rescue a scientist from an underwater Russian city/complex in the Arctic Ocean.

18. Nightmare in Algeria – Camellion battles two terrorist organizations who have joined forces: the Black Avengers and the Blood Sons of Allah.

19. Armageddon, USA! – A far-right group threatens to set off nukes in three American cities unless its demands are met.

20. Hell in Hindu Land – The Death Merchant leads an expedition to a Buddhist monastery in India, where the bodies of aliens (and the secrets of their civilization) may be hidden.

21. The Pole Star Secret – Camellion treks to the North Pole to investigate a possible alien world hidden under the ice cap.

22. The Kondrashev Chase – A highly placed spy behind the Iron Curtain has disappeared while trying to escape to the West, and Camellion must find and rescue him.

23. The Budapest Action – The Hungarians are working with the KGB to develop a hallucinogenic toxin to be released over American cities and the DM is tasked with stopping them.

24. The Kronos Plot – Fidel Castro plans to destroy the Panama Canal.

25. The Enigma Project – Spying on Russia under the cover of finding Noah's Ark.

26. The Mexican Hit

27. The Surinam Affair

28. Nipponese Nightmare – Japanese terrorists try to frame the CIA for murder.

29. Fatal Formula – Tracking a man-made flu strain.

30. Shambhala Strike – An ancient maze of caverns means China could easily invade.

31. Operation Thunderbolt – A bomb-maker is captured by North Korean forces.

32. Deadly Manhunt – An ally betrays Camellion.

33. Alaska Conspiracy

34. Operation Mind-Murder

35. Massacre in Rome – A civilian seems to be able to predict the future.

36. The Cosmic Reality Kill – A cult leader is targeting kids.

37. The Bermuda Triangle Action – The Russians are drilling along a fault line in the Atlantic, where a few well-placed hydrogen bombs could cause catastrophe for the U.S.

38. The Burning Blue Death – A neo-Nazi group called the Brotherhood has created a device that can make a human being spontaneously combust.

39. The Fourth Reich – A neo-Nazi conspiracy to trigger an atom bomb (twice as powerful as Hiroshima) in Cairo is crushed.

40. Blueprint Invisibility – The Red Chinese have stolen a vital top secret U.S. file dealing with electronic camouflage.

41. Shamrock Smash – Someone is supplying the IRA with weapons and the CIA and SIS call on Richard Camellion to find out who.

42. High Command Murder – At the end of World War II, American soldiers stole 100 crates of Nazi gold and hid the loot in an abandoned mine shaft in northern France. The Death Merchant races the Nazis to find it.

43. The Devil's Trashcan – Did the Nazis bury treasure at the bottom of Lake Toplitz during World War II? Camellion, et al. plan to find out.

44. Island of the Damned – Soviet forces develop mind-reading technology.

45. The Rim of Fire Conspiracy – The Russians hope to trigger volcanoes on the U.S. West Coast by exploding bombs along fault lines.

46. Blood Bath – Camellion assists South Africa's ruling whites defeat groups of blacks demanding an end to apartheid.

47. Operation Skyhook

48. Psionics War

49. Night of the Peacock

50. The Hellbomb Theft – Camellion must stop two mini-nukes from falling into the hands of Kaddafi, the dictator of Libya.

51. The Inca File

52. The Flight of the Phoenix

53. The Judas Scrolls

54. Apocalypse, USA! – Libyan terrorists plan to spray deadly nerve gas across the Eastern Seaboard. Not if the Death Merchant has anything to say about it!

55. Slaughter in El Salvador – The Death Merchant heads to war-torn El Salvador, where he tangles with death squads and Communist Sandinista rebels, with predictable carnage.

56. Afghanistan Crashout

57. The Romanian Operation

58. The Silicon Valley Connection

59. The Burma Probe – The Death Merchant teams up with Thunderbolt Unit Omega and Lester Vernon "The Widowmaker" Cole to stop a Chinese territory grab.

60. The Methuselah Factor

61. The Bulgarian Termination

62. The Soul Search Project – Camellion pursues a scientist who can talk to the dead.

63. The Pakistan Mission – A Communist plan to invade Pakistan.

64. The Atlantean Horror – Camellion is in Antarctica, trying to keep an "energy converter" (buried 70,000 years ago by scientists from Atlantis) out of the hands of the Russians.

65. Mission Deadly Snow – The Death Merchant must destroy a South American drug cartel intent on supplying Fidel Castro with thousands of pounds of cocaine.

66. The Cobra Chase – Camellion tracks the Cobra, who escaped from the cocaine processing plant in the previous book.

67. Escape From Gulag Taria – A Soviet physicist who specializes in weather modification wants to defect.

68. The Hindu Trinity Caper – Camellion tracks down an East German spy who has stolen some parts to a nuclear weapon.

69. The Miracle Mission – The Shroud of Turin is stolen by an Arab terrorist group. Camellion's job is to get it back.

70. The Greenland Mission – Camellion and his crew investigate a 'U.F.O.' in Greenland.

'Apocalypse', also called 'Super Death Merchant #1', was released in 1987, and is not part of the standard series (not to be confused with "Apocalypse USA!"). The Soviets perfect a weather-control machine and use it to cause mass destruction; the book ends with nuclear war imminent.

=== Camellion as author ===
Rosenberg wrote two non-fiction books for Paladin Press (Assassination: Theory and Practice and Behavior Modification: The Art of Mind Murdering) with Camellion as the narrator/listed author.

== Tools and gadgets ==
1. Microwave Impedator (a.k.a. Mister Fuck Up): Roughly a briefcase-sized device, it can render useless infrared and other photo-electric detectors. Also can jam transmitters of audio and motion detectors, which operate upon the Doppler principle. Has a built-in self-destruct mechanism.
2. The Plan: Set of lockpick tools inside a small metal cylinder, which can be hidden in the rectum, to be used in case of capture. (Used in #4 Chinese Conspiracy, #16 Invasion of the Clones and #39 The Fourth Reich)
3. D-SEP (Distant Sound Evaluator Pickup or the Big Ear): Tiny device that can amplify existing sound so one can hear a whisper at 30m and breathing at 15m.
4. The GF Mechanism : An electromagnetic field device which can render large objects (such as submarines and helicopters) invisible on radar. Lethal for a human to cross through.

== See also ==
- Able Team
- The Destroyer
- The Executioner
- Nick Carter-Killmaster
- Phoenix Force
