= The Destroyer (novel series) =

Series of novels by Warren Murphy and Richard Sapir

- Author: Warren Murphy; Richard Sapir
- Country: United States
- Language: English
- Genre: Adventure fiction
- Media type: Print (hardcover and paperback), e-book, audiobook

The Destroyer is a series of paperback novels about a U.S. government operative named Remo Williams, originally by Warren Murphy and Richard Sapir. The first novel was published in 1971, although the manuscript was completed on June 25, 1963. Over 150 novels have been published. The main characters were adapted to film in Remo Williams: The Adventure Begins (1985).

== Authors ==
The series was initially co-authored by Warren Murphy and Richard Sapir, with each writing a portion of each book separately. In the late 1970s, the relationship between the two became tense, and Sapir withdrew. In the early 1980s, Murphy began using ghostwriters to help with the series, among them his wife Molly Cochran, Ric Meyers, Bob Randisi, Ted Joy, Ed Hunsburger, and others. In the mid-1980s, Sapir returned to participating in the series.

In the late 1980s, Will Murray took over the sole responsibility of writing the series with #74, having written several previous books with Murphy (and one with Cochran). After Sapir's death, Murray continued the series until the late 1990s. When Murray left after novel #107, three novels were written by interim ghostwriters (#108 & #110 by Mike Newton; #109 by Alan Philipson). Jim Mullaney took over for novels #111-#131, followed by two more by Newton. Tim Somheil was ghostwriter from #134 through #145. Marvel Comics writer Doug Murray wrote two related novels in the series, both involving the Destroyer's battle with a werewolf.

The last Gold Eagle Publishing book, Dragon Bones, was released in October 2006. On July 11, 2006, it was announced that The Destroyer would be moving to Tor Books. Somheil was replaced by Mullaney, who co-wrote the new novels with Warren Murphy. The first Tor novel, The New Destroyer: Guardian Angel, was published in May 2007, accompanied by a re-release of three older novels collected as The Best of the Destroyer. There were a total of four (4) novels in 2007-2008 (#s 146-149), listing Murphy & Mullaney as authors. 'The End of the World' (#150) did not come out until 2013 and lists Murphy as sole author; this book and many reprints marked the start of Destroyer Books as the franchise's own publication company. The last three books (so far), cover the period of 2016-2019 and listed Murphy and R.J. Carter as authors.

In 2002 Murphy started his own publishing house, Ballybunion, as a vehicle for Destroyer spin-off books. Ballybunion, now known as Destroyer Books, has reprinted The Assassin's Handbook, as well as the original works Destroyer World: The Assassin's Handbook II , Destroyer World: The Movie That Never Was (a screenplay he and Richard Sapir wrote for a Destroyer movie that was never optioned), The Way of the Assassin (the wisdom of Chiun), and New Blood, a collection of short stories written by fans of the series.

In 2011 the rights to most of The Destroyer novels reverted to Warren Murphy. They are being released as e-books. Murphy is also reissuing many of the older titles in print format.

In 2017 Gene Donovan Press began publishing new books in the series (starting with Bully Pulpit) written by author R.J. Carter. #151 and #152 show a writing credit of "Warren Murphy with R.J. Carter" while #153 shows "R.J. Carter with Warren Murphy and Richard Sapir".

In 2024, Bold Venture Press published a new anthology produced under license from Warren Murphy Media, LLC. Remo Williams, The Destroyer: The Adventures Continue features 11 new stories by various authors (several of who were ghost writers for Warren Murphy, or previously considered as ghost writers). A twelfth story, "Terminal Philosophy" by Warren Murphy and Will Murray, was originally published in All-Star Action Heroes #1 (Starlog Group, 1989), and previously unreprinted.

== Description ==
The series' hero is Remo Williams, a Newark cop framed for a crime and sentenced to death. His death is faked by the government so he can be trained as an assassin for CURE, a secret organization set up by President Kennedy to defend the country by working outside the law. The head of CURE is Harold W. Smith, a man selected by the President not only for his brilliant mind but also because of his integrity. Smith is a former law instructor at Yale and served in the Office of Strategic Services during World War II.

Remo's trainer and father figure is Chiun, a deadly assassin and the last Master of Sinanju. It has also emerged that Remo is the Avatar of Shiva, as prophesied in the legends of Sinanju. In 1985, a revision of The Assassin's Handbook was published as Inside Sinanju, a companion book to the series. This is narrated primarily in the first person, from Chiun's perspective. It covers anecdotes as well as information on the various villains and history of the series.

The series' basic formula had taken shape by about the third book, but many elements have been introduced into later stories about the early days of Remo's training. In the first book, the word Sinanju is not used at all to describe the martial arts that Chiun teaches Remo. Zen, karate, aikido and judo are used instead. Remo has many trainers for other aspects of being an undercover operative; he is taught to use different types of firearms, and trained in close-quarters assassination. He smokes tobacco, drinks alcohol, and eats red meat, all activities that would later prove harmful or impossible as his body was changed by the harsh Sinanju training regimen. Remo uses a gun to shoot somebody, although it is only to wound, and all his actual kills are hand-to-hand. He does make a conscious choice not to use weapons, after a fight in which he kills a man who had been pointing a gun at him. He realizes that Chiun never carried a gun and is over 70, whereas MacCleary, who had told him to always carry a gun, is dead. The retelling of Remo's origin in the story "The Day Remo Died" in The Assassin's Handbook and in The Destroyer #120-121 and #128 resolve later developments more fully with his origins.

== Villains ==
Remo and Chiun have encountered a number of colorful villains, both human and superhuman. Their foes have run the gamut of pulp fiction, from mobsters to mad scientists to corporate overlords to cult leaders to foreign agents to rival assassin houses to satires of famous real people (mainly politicians and celebrities). Notable examples include:

- Mr. Gordons, a shapeshifting android created by NASA with limited emotional capabilities.
- Cartoonist Uncle Sam Beasley, revived from cryogenic sleep and armed with an animatronic eye and hand.
- Super-soldier Elizu Roote, a cyborg with electricity-based superpowers.
- Friend, an artificial intelligence dedicated to making as much money as possible.
- Nuihc ("Chiun" reversed) the Renegade, Chiun's first pupil and nephew. Once trained, Nuihc deserted his duty of providing for the village of Sinanju to seek personal profit. This forced Chiun out of retirement to train Remo Williams.
- Jeremiah Purcell (a.k.a. the Dutchman), Nuihc's protege and a strong psychic and pyrokinetic.
- Kali, the Hindu goddess who is linked to Remo.
- Mr. Arieson (a.k.a. "Aries", "Mars", "Kakak", and many other names), the ancient God of War that incites men to "honorable" battle with his charisma. Introduced in An Old Fashioned War.
- The Master (also called The Leader), a Chinese vampire (gyonshi) and vegetarian who is the current head of an ancient blood-drinking cult.
- Wu Ming Shi (a.k.a. Dr. Fu Manchu), whose appellation means "The Nameless One" in Mandarin Chinese.
- Sagwa, the bodyguard and right-hand man of Wu Ming Shi, a pastiche of martial artist Bruce Lee. His name means "Stupid One" in Mandarin Chinese.
- Rasputin, an undead Russian monk.
- Dr. Judith White, a scientist specializing in genetic engineering who changed herself into a weretiger.
- The Krahsheevah, a Russian soldier with the ability to walk through walls and transmit his physical form by converting into energy and traveling on phone lines, as well as other unique powers.
- Sa Mangsang, a bizarre, ancient dream entity/supernatural force awakened by a strange seismic disturbance in the South Pacific. It influences global aggression and violence through dreams or psychic means. Introduced in Dream Thing, but first mentioned in Coin of the Realm (as "Sa Mansang"), where it is identified with the Moovian octopus-demon Ru-Taki-Nuhu and the general concept of an opponent of the Supreme Creator.

Given Remo and Chiun's talents as assassins, few of their enemies have survived their initial encounter with them, but some of the above have managed to escape and return in subsequent stories.

== Other media ==
=== Film ===
In 1985, The Destroyer concept was adapted for the theatrical movie Remo Williams: The Adventure Begins, starring Fred Ward as Williams, Joel Grey as Chiun and Wilford Brimley as Harold W. Smith. The film shows the first meeting of Remo and Chiun, and centers on a corrupt weapons manufacturer who is selling guns to the US Army.

In 2014 Sony Pictures hired director Shane Black, a fan of the book series, to begin work on a script by Jim Uhls and The Destroyer series co-author James Mullaney. In a 2018 interview Black said the project was "still very much in play", and he planned to work on the script with Fred Dekker and Jim Mullaney. He praised Mullaney's books in the series as equal to those of Warren Murphy and Richard Sapir's.

=== Television ===
In 1988, an American television pilot, Remo Williams, aired but did not lead to a series. It was a follow-up to the first movie incorporating footage from the movie in the opening credits. It starred Jeffrey Meek as Williams, Roddy McDowall as Chiun, and Stephen Elliott as Harold W. Smith and is loosely based on the novella "The Day Remo Died". Set one year after the events of the feature film, the pilot episode (titled "The Prophecy") was directed by Christian I. Nyby II and the teleplay written by Steven Hensley and J. Miyoko Hensley. The episode featured guest stars Carmen Argenziano, Judy Landers, and Andy Romano. Craig Safan, who scored the movie, returned to provide the music for the pilot; his score was later released by Intrada Records (paired with Safan's score for the TV movie Mission of the Shark: The Saga of the U.S.S. Indianapolis).

The television pilot had not been seen since 1988 until the Encore cable television channel began airing it in the summer of 2009.

On December 8, 2022, it was announced that Gordon Smith will be adapting a TV series version of The Destroyer for Sony Pictures Television with Adrian Askarieh executive producing.

=== Comic books ===
There have been several Destroyer comic book and magazine series published by various companies including Marvel.

=== Audio book ===
Books 95–122 in the series were released in audiobook format by GraphicAudio.

Books 3, 12 and 19 in the series were also released in audiobook format. These were produced by Speaking Volumes, LLC.

Assassin's Playoff was published by Speaking Volumes (ISBN 978-1-935138-02-0), number 20 in the list of audiobook format. Not sure if the three book numbers are incorrect or if there was a fourth release.

== Series listing ==
1. Created, The Destroyer (1971)
2. Death Check (1972)
3. Chinese Puzzle (1972)
4. Mafia Fix (1972)
5. Dr. Quake (1972)
6. Death Therapy (1972)
7. Union Bust (1973)
8. Summit Chase (1973)
9. Murder's Shield (1973)
10. Terror Squad (1973)
11. Kill or CURE (1973)
12. Slave Safari (1973)
13. Acid Rock (1973)
14. Judgment Day (1974)
15. Murder Ward (1974)
16. Oil Slick (1974)
17. Last War Dance (1974)
18. Funny Money (1975)
19. Holy Terror (1975)
20. Assassin's Play-Off (1975)
21. Deadly Seeds (1975)
22. Brain Drain (1976)
23. Child's Play (1976)
24. King's Curse (1976)
25. Sweet Dreams (1976)
26. In Enemy Hands (1977)
27. The Last Temple (1977)
28. Ship of Death (1977)
29. The Final Death (1977)
30. Mugger Blood (1977)
31. The Head Men (1977)
32. Killer Chromosomes (1978)
33. Voodoo Die (1978)
34. Chained Reaction (1978)
35. Last Call (1978)
36. Power Play (1979)
37. Bottom Line (1979)
38. Bay City Blast (1979)
39. Missing Link (1980)
40. Dangerous Games (1980)
41. Firing Line (1980)
42. Timber Line (1980)
43. Midnight Man (1981)
44. Balance of Power (1981)
45. Spoils of War (1981)
46. Next of Kin (1981)
47. Dying Space (1982)
48. Profit Motive (1982)
49. Skin Deep (1982)
50. Killing Time (1982)
51. Shock Value (1983)
52. Fool's Gold (1983)
53. Time Trial (1983)
54. Last Drop (1983)
55. Master's Challenge (1984)
56. Encounter Group (1984)
57. Date With Death (1984)
58. Total Recall (1984)
59. The Arms of Kali (1984)
60. The End of the Game (1985)
61. Lords of the Earth (1985)
62. The Seventh Stone (1985)
63. The Sky Is Falling (1986)
64. The Last Alchemist (1986)
65. Lost Yesterday (1986)
66. Sue Me (1986)
67. Look Into My Eyes (1987)
68. An Old-Fashioned War (1987)
69. Blood Ties (1987)
70. The Eleventh Hour (1987)
71. Return Engagement (1988)
72. Sole Survivor (1988)
73. Line of Succession (1988)
74. Walking Wounded (1988)
75. Rain of Terror (1989)
76. The Final Crusade (1989)
77. Coin of the Realm (1989)
78. Blue Smoke And Mirrors (1989)
79. Shooting Schedule (1990)
80. Death Sentence (1990)
81. Hostile Takeover (1990)
82. Survival Course (1990)
83. Skull Duggery (1991)
84. Ground Zero (1991)
85. Blood Lust (1991)
86. Arabian Nightmare (1991)
87. Mob Psychology (1992)
88. The Ultimate Death (1992)
89. Dark Horse (1992)
90. Ghost in the Machine (1992)
91. Cold Warrior (1993)
92. The Last Dragon (1993)
93. Terminal Transmission (1993)
94. Feeding Frenzy (1993)
95. High Priestess (1994)
96. Infernal Revenue (1994)
97. Identity Crisis (1994)
98. Target of Opportunity (1995)
99. The Color of Fear (1995)
100. Last Rites (1995)
101. Bidding War (1995)
102. Unite and Conquer (1996)
103. Engines Of Destruction (1996)
104. Angry White Mailmen (1996)
105. Scorched Earth (1996)
106. White Water (1997)
107. Feast or Famine (1997)
108. Bamboo Dragon (1997)
109. American Obsession (1997)
110. Never Say Die (1998)
111. Prophet of Doom (1998)
112. Brain Storm (1998)
113. The Empire Dreams (1998)
114. Failing Marks (1999)
115. Misfortune Teller (1999)
116. The Final Reel (1999)
117. Deadly Genes (1999)
118. Killer Watts (2000)
119. Fade To Black (2000)
120. The Last Monarch (2000)
121. A Pound of Prevention (2000)
122. Syndication Rites (2001)
123. Disloyal Opposition (2001)
124. By Eminent Domain (2001)
125. The Wrong Stuff (2001)
126. Air Raid (2002)
127. Market Force (2002)
128. The End of the Beginning (2002)
129. Father To Son (2002)
130. Waste Not, Want Not (2003)
131. Unnatural Selection (2003)
132. Wolf's Bane (2003)
133. Troubled Waters (2003)
134. Bloody Tourists (2004)
135. Political Pressure (2004)
136. Unpopular Science (2004)
137. Industrial Evolution (2004)
138. No Contest (2005)
139. Dream Thing (2005)
140. Dark Ages (2005)
141. Frightening Strikes (2005)
142. Mindblower (2006)
143. Bad Dog (2006)
144. Holy Mother (2006)
145. Dragon Bones (2006)
146. Choke Hold (2007)
147. Guardian Angel (2007)
148. Dead Reckoning (2008)
149. Killer Ratings (2008)
150. The End of the World (2013)
151. Bully Pulpit (2016)
152. Continental Divide (2018)
153. Monumental Terror (2019)
154. Blood Brotherhood (2021)
155. Trial by Fire (2021)
- The Assassin's Handbook (1983) features a novella The Day Remo Died. It was republished in 1985 as Inside Sinanju.
- Remo: The Adventure Begins... (1985): a novelization of the script by Christopher Wood
- Destroyer World: The Assassin's Handbook 2 (2003): sequel to The Assassin's Handbook.
- Destroyer World: New Blood (originally published in 2005, republished on May 21, 2010): an anthology of Destroyer stories written by both Warren Murphy and fans alike.
- The Best of the Destroyer (May 1, 2007): a collection of three early Destroyer books: Chinese Puzzle, Slave Safari, and Assassin's Playoff.
- More Blood: A Sinanju Anthology (December 7, 2014): another anthology and sequel to New Blood.
- Remo Williams, The Destroyer: The Adventures Continue (November 1, 2024): another anthology.

In 2007, Tor Books published four books in the series; due to contractual issues, the titles were changed to "The New Destroyer", although the characters were unchanged. The numbering also restarted, so the first book is called "The New Destroyer #1", rather than "Destroyer #146".

1. Guardian Angel (May 2007)
2. Choke Hold (October 2007)
3. Dead Reckoning (April 2008)
4. Killer Ratings (July 2008)

The series also includes several novellas, now available online from many of the different e-reader companies:

1. The Day Remo Died (a reissue of the story from The Assassin's Handbook)
2. Destroyer World: The Way Of The Assassin
3. Savage Song (March 2012)
4. Number Two (October 2012)
5. Rising Son: The Ascension of Chiun (June 26, 2024)

Starting in November 21, 2012, the Legacy spin-off series, featuring Remo's father (Bill "Sunny Joe" Roam), Remo's son (Stone Smith), and Remo's daughter (Freya Williams; Stone's half-sister), was introduced. It was co-written by Warren Murphy and Gerald Welch until Murphy's death in 2015, after which Gerald Welch continued it on his own:

1. Forgotten Son (November 21, 2012)
2. The Killing Fields (July 29, 2013)
3. Overload (May 7, 2014)
4. Trial and Terror (October 30, 2014)
5. Mother Mine (December 4, 2015)
6. Laughing Matter (January 13, 2017)
7. 100 Proof (August 18, 2018)
8. Homecoming (May 15, 2021)

Even though both of the original creators have been deceased since 2015, new books in the Destroyer series are still being published:

151. Bully Pulpit (February 18, 2016)
152. Continental Divide (January 2018)
153. Monumental Terror (September 2019)
154. Blood Brotherhood (2021)
155. Trial by Fire (December, 2021)

== See also ==
- Able Team
- Death Merchant
- Nick Carter-Killmaster
- Phoenix Force
- Mack Bolan
