= Phoenix Force (novel) =

Novel series (published 1982–1991)

- Cover of Phoenix Force No. 1, Argentine Deadline
- Author: Gar Wilson
- Published: 1982-1992
- Publication place: United States
- Media type: Print
- Pages: 188 (1982-1986); 220 (1986-1992)
- Followed by: Stony Man (1991-present)

Phoenix Force is a series of action-adventure novels written by several authors under the shared pseudonym Gar Wilson. Published between 1982 and 1991, and spanning 55 novels (and several anthologized short stories), the series follows the exploits of the five-man, anti-terrorist team Phoenix Force. There were 51 novels in the Phoenix Force series, plus 4 Super Phoenix Force special editions. The characters also appeared in the three Heroes paperback anthologies published by Gold Eagle. The series ended in 1991 but the characters went on to star in the Stony Man series that followed.

Phoenix Force is one of two neutralization teams working for Stony Man, a top-secret anti-terrorist organization. It is a spin-off of the Executioner series created by Don Pendleton. In 1991, Gold Eagle combined Phoenix Force with another Executioner spin-off series, Able Team, and launched the Stony Man book series, which ran a total of 140 novels, ending in 2015.

== Characters ==
Originally, Phoenix Force was composed of Yakov Katzenelenbogen, a French-Israeli commando; Gary Manning, Canadian demolitions expert and security engineer; Keio Ohara, Japanese Martial Arts and electronics expert; David McCarter, former SAS operator and pilot; and Rafael Encizo, Cuban survivor of the Bay of Pigs Invasion and Castro's prisons. Ohara was killed in the course of the series and replaced with Calvin James, African-American Vietnam veteran. Katz retired from field work, resulting in McCarter becoming the new team leader, and T.J. Hawkins was recruited by Katz and Mack Bolan to become the fifth member of Phoenix Force.

The Phoenix Force team has used the assistance of John Trent, Japanese-American ninjitsu master; and Karl Hahn, former GSG 9 operator turned BND agent.

=== Phoenix Force members ===
==== David McCarter ====
McCarter is the current commander of Phoenix Force. A Cockney born in London's East End neighborhood, McCarter is a former SAS operator who participated in the Iranian Embassy Siege and spent a tour of duty in Vietnam as a "special observer". McCarter is a big, strong man who thrives on action. He is unmatched in combat, with significant battlefield experience and great marksmanship with a pistol. McCarter is often the first in a firefight, with a degree of desire for action that borders on recklessness. He is an action junkie with Katz summing up "that man would be lost without a battlefield." He is also highly sarcastic and always gets in the last word.

McCarter's attitude often leads to friction between him and Gary Manning, and the two frequently take jabs at each other. However, their conflict is good-natured and not detrimental to the team.

One of McCarter's quirks is consuming large amounts of Coca-Cola.

McCarter's preferred SMG was the Ingram MAC-10 in 9mm, but it had jammed on one mission, causing him to adopt the Intratec KG-99. His preferred pistol is the Browning Hi-Power.

==== Rafael Encizo ====
Originally from Cuba, Encizo assisted in Fidel Castro's revolution in Cuba. Upon realizing that he had helped install a Communist regime, Encizo turned against the Communists and was subsequently imprisoned. He escaped and fled to America, and later came back during the Bay of Pigs Invasion. Encizo was captured a second time as a result, and tortured for several months before making a second escape.

Rafael Encizo's younger brother, Raul, was taken from the family at a very young age, and joined the Cuban army. Rafael and Raul have fought against each other on two occasions, the second of which resulted in Raul's death after he turned on a group of Communist terrorists he was working with.

Encizo's preferred weapons are the H&K MP5 and a Smith & Wesson or a Walther PPK pistol (later changed to the H&K P9). He is also the team's edged weapons expert, favoring the Cold Steel Tanto.

==== Gary Manning ====
Phoenix Force's Canadian demolitions expert, the team's most talented sniper, and silent weapons expert. Manning grew up hunting and working for his uncle's demolitions company. During the Vietnam War, Manning was attached to a US Special Forces team as an "observer" (much like McCarter). Following the war, Manning settled down, got married and became an executive of a major import-export firm. The marriage failed, but the business prospered. Because of his wealth, Manning is the most unlikely of the Phoenix Force members. He seems more down to earth than the others, and is annoyed at McCarter's actions, although the two are friends.

Manning's weapons of choice are the FN FAL and the Desert Eagle .357 Magnum. In later books, he uses the SA80 and the Walther P5.

==== Calvin James ====
Hailing from the south side of Chicago, James grew up in an environment full of drugs and gang violence. His parents died when he was young; his mother murdered by a drug dealer. At the age of 17, James became a hospital corpsman with the Navy SEALs and fought in the Vietnam War. His brother, Waldo James, who was also in the Vietnam War, went MIA and was never seen again. After the war, James continued studying to become a doctor, but when his sister, Susan James, died of a drug overdose, he instead joined the San Francisco Police Department as a SWAT officer.

During the time the Black Alchemist terrorist conspiracy was going on, James and his SWAT partner, Don Rambo, were infiltrating the Hilldale Pacific Bank to rescue people taken hostage by the Arma de Liberacion de Puerto Rico, or ALPR. During the infiltration, Rambo was killed by one of the terrorists. James almost shared the same fate, but was rescued by McCarter and Manning, who had infiltrated the building looking for him.

After helping James deal with the terrorists, McCarter and Manning shanghaied him and transported him to Stony Man Farm, where his skills and knowledge of chemistry proved invaluable. After Keio Ohara was killed, Hal Brognola and the rest of Phoenix Force offered him a spot on the team. Since he felt that Phoenix Force was where he really belonged, he agreed, becoming the unit's unofficial medical corpsman. He regularly administers truth serums to captured terrorists in order to gain information. He is streetwise and not as knowledgeable about world affairs as the other team members, but is also a natural con artist to help with undercover work.

James' weapons of choice are the M16 fitted with the M203 grenade launcher, and the Colt Commander. In later books, he is armed with a Beretta 92SB automatic pistol.

==== T. J. Hawkins ====
Thomas Jackson Hawkins was brought in as a new member of Phoenix Force when Yakov Katzenelenbogen retired from field work and David McCarter became the new commander of the team. Named after famous Confederate general Stonewall Jackson, Hawkins was born in the U.S. Army hospital at Fort Benning, Georgia. He is the second of three sons born to a U.S. Army career infantry NCO who served as an adviser to an ARVN Ranger battalion. His father was killed during the Tet Offensive. At age 5, Hawkins and his entire family moved to Fort Hood, Texas.

Following in his father's footsteps, Hawkins joined the Army after graduating from high school in 1980. When he completed basic training, he volunteered for Airborne training, earning his parachute wings in the process. Later accepted for training by the Rangers and subsequently assigned to the 75th Ranger Regiment. During this assignment, he participated in Operation Urgent Fury and Operation Just Cause as part of a recon team.

Years later, he was assigned to Delta Force, leading one of its recon teams into Iraq during Operation Desert Storm to look for Scud missile launchers to be bombed by the Air Force. On one of these missions, the Black Hawk chopper transporting his unit went down outside Baghdad. Hawkins led his team to safety in the aftermath of the crash. For this action, he was awarded the Silver Star.

During Operation Restore Hope, Hawkins and 12 others of his Delta Force unit were assigned to escort a United Nations team sent to secure a Somali village that was being threatened by a small-time warlord and 24 of his gunmen. The leader of the U.N. team, a Swedish major, had backed down from the warlord's threats and was ready to stand by while the villagers were massacred. However, Hawkins was unwilling to follow the major's lead and refused to stand down. The warlord threatened Hawkins with his pistol, but the Georgia native responded by shooting him dead. His men chased the warlord's troops away, saving all the villagers, an act for which Hawkins should have been rewarded.

Instead, upon their return to the U.N. headquarters in Somalia's capital of Mogadishu, the Swedish major declared his intention to bring Hawkins up on murder charges. The young noncom responded by threatening to break the story of the major backing down and deciding to let innocent villagers be murdered in cold blood. Because of the political implications of the incident, Hawkins was allowed to resign his commission. He was honorably discharged, returning to his Texas home shortly thereafter.

Hawkins was reluctant to join Phoenix Force at first, fearing that the organization had too many political connections, but after he saw their after-action reports and was made aware of Mack Bolan's true identity, he agreed to join the team. Since then, his expertise in electronic communications and airborne operations has made him a valuable asset to Phoenix Force.

His friends call him either T. J. or Hawk.

A serious individual when he needs to be, Hawkins has a deep sense of how things should be, and will sometimes conceal his true feelings with his Southernism.

=== Stony Man crew ===
Phoenix Force is supported by the Stony Man crew. This crew provides a wide variety of expertise, ranging from piloting aircraft or hacking into a computer database.

Stony Man crew members:

Hal Brognola Harold Brognola is the Stony Man project director. He is responsible for assigning missions to both Phoenix Force and Able Team, as well as providing them with intelligence, weapons, transportation, and anything else they may require to conduct their assignments. Brognola enjoys chewing on expensive cigars.

Jack Grimaldi Stony Man's ace pilot, Grimaldi is often called on to assist in situations which require the use of air assets. Grimaldi is competent with all aircraft, both fixed-wing and helicopters.

Aaron "The Bear" Kurtzman Kurtzman is the computer expert of the Stony Man farm. His role is to obtain intel from other government agencies and process it. Kurtzman lost the use of his legs in an assault on Stony Man Farm, and has since been forced to use a wheelchair. He has made several attempts to regain the use of his legs.

Barbara Price Taking over from April Rose, Barbara Price serves as Stony Man's mission controller. At the request of the President, she assisted with the security clearances when Stony Man was initially set up. She and Mack Bolan are friends and sometimes lovers.

Buck Greene Taking over from the man who replaced the traitorous Captain Wade, Buck Greene serves as Stony Man's chief of security and leads the Blacksuits, a security force maintained by Stony Man to provide security for the Farm.

Charlie Mott A former Vietnam veteran and ex-Marine, Charlie Mott is the second Stony Man pilot, behind Jack Grimaldi.

John Kissinger Taking over from the murdered Andrzej Konzaki, John 'Cowboy' Kissinger serves as Stony Man's weaponsmith. Kissinger first worked for the Bureau of Narcotics and Dangerous Drugs, the predecessor to the DEA. After the dismantling of the BND, Kissinger went freelance, offering his talents to companies like Colt, Beretta, Heckler & Koch, and IMI.

Prof. Huntington Wethers A former cybernetics professor at UCLA, Huntington 'Hunt' Wethers was recruited by Aaron Kurtzman for his expertise in computers and cybernetics. While Kurtzman looks at computers as a means of leveraging information, Wethers looks at computers as a science.

Akira Tokaido Of Japanese extraction, Akira Tokaido is an expert computer hacker and the youngest member of Stony Man's cybernetic team. He listens to rock music on his headphones, which are often attached to a cassette player or CD player, claiming that it helps him focus on his work. At times, he is unconventional in his thinking and is cocky. He is an expert in kanji and has a deep interest in learning about his Japanese heritage.

Leo Turrin Like Mack Bolan, Rosario Blancanales and Hermann Schwarz, Leo 'The Pussy' Turrin is a Vietnam veteran and former Green Beret. His association with the Mafia came because of connections his family had. He rose up through the ranks and became a capo, involving himself in various criminal activities.

=== Associates ===
- John Trent

John Inoshiro Trent is the owner and operator of a dojo, or martial arts school, in San Francisco, California, and a master of ninjutsu. His father, Sgt. Victor J. Trent, was an American serviceman stationed in Japan during reconstruction efforts after World War II. His mother, Reko Nakezuri, lost most of her family in the Tokyo firebombing that was carried out by the U.S. Army Air Corps. Her brother, Inoshiro Nakezuri, was an officer in the Imperial Japanese Navy and a covert operative who specialized in ninjutsu.

When John was born, his uncle Inoshiro, from whom John gets his middle name, took a personal interest in him, training him in the ways of the ninja. John proved to be an outstanding student, much to his uncle's delight.

Being a ninja, he is most adept with such weapons as the ninja-do and shuriken, but he also uses shotguns and pistols. In addition to being fluent in both English and Japanese, Trent also speaks Mandarin. His skills proved invaluable to Phoenix Force during a mission in San Francisco involving two crime syndicates, MERGE and TRIO. Phoenix Force would later draw on these skills during their Far East assignments, and Trent would later work on a mission with Mack Bolan himself. Calvin James has an association with Trent from his days as a policeman in San Francisco.

== Deceased characters ==
Over the course of the series, some notable characters have died.

=== Members ===
- Yakov "Katz" Katzenelenbogen

Known as 'Katz' to his friends, Col. Yakov Katzenelenbogen was the original Phoenix Force leader when Bolan first assembled the team. Born in Russia, his father was a noted linguist and translator, and Yakov grew up speaking four languages: English, French, German and Russian. Katz assisted the French Resistance during the Nazi occupation. Later, he moved to Israel.

During the Six-Day War, Katz lost his right arm and his only son. Before joining Phoenix Force, he worked for the Mossad, Israel's intelligence unit. Katz was held in high regard by the other Phoenix Force members. After a mission in the Far East, Katz retired from field work and went on to serve as Stony Man's tactical adviser. Katz was killed on a personal mission to stop a terrorist conspiracy in the Middle East, leading Mack Bolan to take up where he left off with support from Stony Man's top operatives and a top Mossad agent.

Katz's prosthetic arm featured hooks which could be effective in a fistfight, and could often be replaced with a realistic-looking arm or a version that fired a single .22 Magnum bullet. His age, slightly paunchy appearance and prosthetic arm often caused opponents to underestimate him.

Katz's weapons of choice were the IMI Uzi, Heckler & Koch P7, SIG Sauer P226, and a Spetznaz ballistic knife.

- Keio Ohara

Keio Ohara was the youngest member of Phoenix Force when Mack Bolan first assembled the team. He served as an officer of the JGSDF, holding the rank of captain. He was trained as a paracommando, but had no real experience in the field. Held black belts in both karate and judo. Loved to drive fast without regard to the rules of the road at times. Also loved cigars and racing motorcycles. Even though he kept an apartment in the Japantown section of San Francisco, he saw Tokyo as his home.

His uncle, Teko Ohara, had been exiled from the Ohara clan after associating with yakuza gangsters after World War II, which was a disgrace to the clan. Teko challenged the decision and demanded a duel of honor with his successor, who happened to be Keio's father, Toshiro Ohara. Toshiro won the duel, but he and his wife were later murdered by Teko. He later joined up with Professor Edward Oshimi, the founder of the terrorist group called the Japanese Red Cell, in his plot against the U.S. government. However, he and some of his JRC associates were on the Hawaiian island of Lānaʻi when Phoenix Force attacked the mad professor's stronghold, so Keio had no idea of his uncle's involvement until he broke into Keio's apartment and left a note challenging him to a duel to the death on Alcatraz Island. Keio eliminated his uncle's associates before facing him in the duel, whereupon Teko gleefully admitted his guilt in the deaths of Keio's parents. Keio won the duel by killing him, avenging his parents in the process.

Keio Ohara would later be killed in action during the mission against the Black Alchemist terror group led by Maurice Cercueil, the former head of Haiti's Tonton Macoute secret police organization. There is a small monument to Keio at Arlington National Cemetery, simply inscribed with the following word:

Samurai.

=== Associates ===
- Karl Hahn

Karl Hahn first served West Germany as an operator for the GSG 9 counter-terrorist unit. In this capacity, Hahn operated against the Baader-Meinhof Gang, aka Red Army Faction, Second June Movement, and various Palestinian terrorist groups. He was one of the GSG 9 commandos who carried out Operation Feuerzauber (Fire Magic), the famous rescue mission in Mogadishu, Somalia, against the PFLP terrorist team holding 86 hostages aboard Lufthansa Flight 181, hijacked on October 13, 1977.

During his career, members of the RAF captured Hahn's best friend, GSG 9 operator Klaus Hausberg. They tortured and mutilated Hausberg to the point where Hahn had to put him out of his misery with a bullet to his brain. Eager to avenge Hausberg, Hahn hunted down and executed no less than eight RAF members. When his superiors learned of this, they dismissed him from the GSG 9.

He was later recruited by the BND, West Germany's federal intelligence agency, and trained as a covert operative. He handled assignments in East Germany and Czechoslovakia, and was stationed in Turkey when he first met Phoenix Force during a mission against the KGB. He later worked with Phoenix Force on several occasions, most notably filling in for Rafael Encizo, who was injured during a mission in France against ODESSA. Hahn was eventually killed in action during a Phoenix Force mission in Europe to rescue the President of the United States and the Premier of the Soviet Union (Super Phoenix Force #1: Fire Storm).

Hahn studied computer electronics as an exchange student at UCLA, spoke three languages fluently, and had a working knowledge of Czech and Russian. Possessing a dry sense of humor, he was also capable of making weapons out of common objects like a newspaper for close-quarter combat.

== Books ==
There are a total of 51 books in the official series, plus 4 "Super Phoenix Force" novels. Phoenix Force also appeared in the three "Heroes" anthology paperbacks published by gold medal.

The first book, Argentine Deadline, was published in June 1982, and the 51st, Savage World, was published in January 1991.

#	Title	Author	Date
1	Argentine Deadline	Don Pendleton and Gar Wilson	June 1982
2	Guerilla Games	Dan Marlowe	June 1982
3	Atlantic Scramble	Thomas Ramirez	November 1982
4	Tigers of Justice	William Fieldhouse	April 1983
5	The Fury Bombs	Robert Hoskins	May 1983
6	White Hell	Thomas Ramirez	July 1983
7	Dragon's Kill	William Fieldhouse	September 1983
8	Aswan Hellbox	Thomas Ramirez and Sergeant Rex Swenson	November 1983
9	Ultimate Terror	William Fieldhouse	January 1984
10	Korean Killground	Thomas Ramirez	March 1984
11	Return to Armageddon	William Fieldhouse	May 1984
12	The Black Alchemists	William Fieldhouse	July 1984
13	Harvest Hell	William Fieldhouse	September 1984
14	Phoenix in Flames	William Fieldhouse	November 1984
15	The Viper Factor	William Fieldhouse	January 1985
-	Duel of Honor	William Fieldhouse	January 1985
16	No Rules, No Referee	William Fieldhouse	March 1985
17	Welcome to the Feast	William Fieldhouse	May 1985
18	Night of the Thuggee	William Fieldhouse	July 1985
19	Sea of Savages	Paul Glen Neuman	September 1985
20	Tooth and Claw	William Fieldhouse	November 1985
21	The Twisted Cross	Paul Glen Neuman	January 1986
22	Time Bomb	William Fieldhouse	March 1986
23	Chip Off the Bloc	Paul Glen Neuman	May 1986
24	The Doomsday Syndrome	William Fieldhouse	July 1986
25	Down Under Thunder	Paul Glen Neuman	September 1986
26	Hostaged Vatican	William Fieldhouse	November 1986
27	Weep, Moscow, Weep	William Fieldhouse	January 1987
28	Slow Death	Paul Glen Neuman	March 1987
29	The Nightmare Merchants	William Fieldhouse	May 1987
30	The Bonn Blitz	Paul Glen Neuman	July 1987
31	Terror in the Dark	William Fieldhouse	September 1987
32	Fair Game	Paul Glen Neuman	November 1987
33	Ninja Blood	William Fieldhouse	January 1988
34	Power Gambit	William Fieldhouse	March 1988
35	Kingston Carnage	William Fieldhouse	May 1988
36	Belgrade Deception	William Fieldhouse	July 1988
37	Show of Force	Dan Streib	September 1988
38	Missile Menace	Mike Linaker	November 1988
-	Super Phoenix Force #1: Fire Storm	William Fieldhouse	November 1988
39	Jungle Sweep	William Fieldhouse	January 1989
40	Rim of Fire	Dan Streib	March 1989
-	Super Phoenix Force #2: Search and Destroy	Mike Linaker	March 1989
41	Amazon Strike	Mike Linaker	May 1989
42	China Command	William Fieldhouse	July 1989
43	Gulf of Fire	William Fieldhouse	September 1989
44	Main Offensive	Mike Linaker	November 1989
45	African Burn	William Fieldhouse	January 1990
46	Iron Claymore	William Fieldhouse	March 1990
-	Super Phoenix Force #3: Cold Dead	William Fieldhouse	April 1990
47	Terror in Guyana	William Fieldhouse	May 1990
48	Barracuda Run	Mike Linaker	July 1990
49	Salvador Assault	William Fieldhouse	September 1990
50	Extreme Prejudice	Mike Linaker	November 1990
51	Savage World	William Fieldhouse	January 1991
-	Super Phoenix Force #4: Wall of Flame	William Fieldhouse	January 1991
-	Survival Run	Mike Linaker	July 1992
-	Hell Quest	William Fieldhouse	August 1992
-	Dirty Mission	Mike Linaker	August 1992
-	Terror in Warsaw	William Fieldhouse	September 1992

== See also ==
- The Executioner (book series)
  - Able Team
  - Mack Bolan
  - Stony Man
- Death Merchant
- The Destroyer
- Nick Carter-Killmaster
