= Mark Stone: MIA Hunter =

Series of men's adventure novels

Mark Stone: MIA Hunter is a series of men's adventure novels created and outlined by Stephen Mertz and co-written with Joe R. Lansdale, Michael Newton, and Bill Crider under the pseudonym "Jack Buchanan".

== Series listing ==
- 1 - M.I.A. Hunter
- 2 - Cambodian Hellhole
- 3 - Hanoi Deathgrip (written by Joe R. Lansdale)
- 4 - Mountain Massacre (written by Joe R. Lansdale)
- 5 - Exodus from Hell
- 6 - Blood Storm
- 7 - Saigon Slaughter (written by Joe R. Lansdale)
- 8 - Escape from Nicaragua
- 9 - Invasion U.S.S.R.
- 10 - Miami War Zone (written by Bill Crider)
- 11 - Crossfire Kill
- 12 - Desert Death Raid (written by Bill Crider)
- 13 - L.A. Gang War
- 14 - Back to 'Nam (written by Bill Crider)
- 15 - Heavy Fire
- 16 - China Strike
