= Able Team =

Action novel series

Cover to Able Team #1.

Able Team is a series of action-adventure novels first published in 1982 by American Gold Eagle publishers. It is a spin-off of the Executioner series created by Don Pendleton. There were 51 novels in the Able Team series, plus two Super Able Team special editions (and several anthologized short stories). The characters also appeared in the three Heroes paperback anthologies published by Gold Eagle. The series ended in 1991 but the characters went on to star in the Stony Man series that followed.

Able Team is one of two neutralization teams working for Stony Man, a top-secret anti-terrorist organization based in Virginia. Able Team is composed of Carl Lyons, Rosario Blancanales, and Hermann Schwarz. As with The Executioner, the Able Team novels have been written by a succession of authors under the pseudonym "Dick Stivers". In 1991, Gold Eagle combined Able Team with another Executioner spin-off series, Phoenix Force, and launched the Stony Man book series, which ran 140 novels and ended in 2015. Lyons, Blancanales, and Schwarz were always active in the Stony Man series.

== Origin ==
Able Team has a rather colorful past leading to becoming part of Stony Man. The group began during the Vietnam War as a penetration team assigned to deal with the Viet Cong and the North Vietnamese Army. The name itself comes from a U.S. Army designation of groups of soldiers designated team A, team B and team C. Instead of calling the teams A, B and C, words are attached to each to refer to the team. Team A is typically called Team Able, B is typically called Team Bravo and C is called Team Charlie. After Vietnam, members of Team A ran a private investigation company called Able Group, before being recruited to Stony Man.

- Hermann "Gadgets" Schwarz

Herman Schwarz is an electronics specialist. He is skilled in dealing with anything electronic or mechanical, including booby traps and surveillance devices, which is why he is known as Gadgets.

- Rosario "Pol" Blancanales

A native of East L.A., Blancanales is the son of hard working Hispanic parents. An infiltration specialist, he is known as the Politician, or Pol for short, because of his ability to handle volatile situations among people, just like a politician. Once served as a volunteer for a Catholic youth group in his neighborhood. Has two sisters, Toni and Maria. Toni was in several of the early books, and was once taken prisoner by the local Mafia.

- George "Whispering Death" Zitka

Also known as Zitter, Zitka served as Bolan's scout, where his abilities came in handy on various military operations.

- William "Boom-Boom" Hoffower

A former Quaker from Pennsylvania, Hoffower was Bolan's demolitions expert. He only knew Bolan for a short time in Vietnam and remained unaware of his war against the Mafia. Once rigged his house to blow up when it was repossessed by the mortgage company.

- Thomas "Bloodbrother" Loudelk

A Blackfoot Indian from Montana, Loudelk worked with Bolan and Zitka on various military operations. He is an expert with a knife and could kill a human target by breaking his neck with his bare hands. Returned to his reservation after being released from military service.

- Angelo "Chopper" Fontenelli

A native of New Jersey, Fontenelli was an expert in heavy automatic weapons. Parents are of Italian origin.

- Juan "Flower Child" Andromede

Born to Puerto Rican parents in New York's ghettos, Andromede was also a heavy weapons expert, like Fontenelli. He is known for vehemently denying he had ever killed anyone, claiming instead that he had liberated souls.

- James "Gunsmoke" Harrington

Serving as Bolan's flanker during the Vietnam War, Jim Harrington was one of the few men ever allowed to carry personal weapons in combat. He often carried two six-guns, which he wore quick-draw style. Spoke with an Old West twang.

- Mark "Deadeye" Washington

An African-American from Mississippi, Washington was an expert sniper, just like Bolan himself. Often used a high-powered long-distance rifle with a 20× sniper scope.

== Death Squad ==
At the conclusion of the war in Vietnam, Zitka and the rest left military service. When Bolan called Zitka after reaching L.A., Zitka tried to warn Bolan away, but Bolan saw through the warning and came to Zitka's aid, as he had been taken prisoner by hitmen in an attempt to lure Bolan into a trap to collect on the bounty placed on Bolan by the Mafia. Bolan eliminated the hitmen, and he and Zitka decided to recruit the others to help in the hit on the L.A. branch of the Mafia.

Calling themselves the Death Squad, their first mission was a battle against Mafia boss Julian "Deej" DiGeorge and his criminal empire, which he ran from his mansion in Beverly Hills. The assault on the DiGeorge compound was a complete success, but the cost was staggering. Zitka, Hoffower, Loudelk, Fontenelli, Andromede, Harrington and Washington died in the assault. Bolan, Schwarz, and Blancanales were the only survivors.

At the conclusion of the war in L.A., Schwarz and Blancanales formed a private investigations company called Able Group, where Toni Blancanales, Politician's sister, currently serves as president and general manager.

== Carl "Ironman" Lyons ==
One of LAPD's most promising detectives, Carl Lyons has known Mack Bolan since the beginning of his Mafia war. At the time, he did not approve of Bolan's methods and was, in fact, part of a special LAPD unit known as the Hardcase Corps, specifically designed to bring Bolan in, dead or alive. That all changed when Mack Bolan saved his life during his mission against Julian DiGeorge. Lyons would later be recruited by the Sensitive Operations Group, a special organized crime task force led by Hal Brognola.

During his LAPD career, he married Jane Mahoney, and had one son, Tommy. Because of the strain of his work, Lyons and his wife subsequently divorced after eight years of marriage. She would later go on to marry Steve Odom, vice president for a high-tech company called the SanDor Corporation.

Lyons is often described as looking like an Ironman, and this is one reason for his nickname. Another reason is that he likes to use immediate, overwhelming force to solve problems, even though he has sometimes used a more patient, subtle approach when force cannot be used.

== Stony Man ==
When Hal Brognola and Mack Bolan first put together the Stony Man operation, Bolan himself personally hand selected Lyons, Schwarz and Blancanales for inclusion in the organization to become what is now known as Able Team. To this day, the unit remains the only one of the two Stony Man action teams that has had any history with Bolan.

As time passed, Able Team began to handle domestic situations inside the United States, leaving Phoenix Force to deal with crises overseas, although there have been some missions where Able Team had to go overseas.

Able Team had to handle one mission in the United States that involved Lyons' ex-wife, Jane Odom. Her home had been invaded by modern-day marauders on a crime spree for a quick buck. During the raid, these marauders found top-secret documents from the SanDor Corporation regarding the Strategic Defense Initiative, the so-called Star Wars program. Mrs. Odom sent a note to Carl Lyons about the incident. Even though Lyons and his ex-wife did not meet in that incident, he and his teammates, with help from a U.S. Marshal named Dana McKee, stopped the marauders and dealt with a team of Russian KGB agents who intended to buy the SanDor documents.

== Authors ==
- Tom Arnett
- Nicholas Cain
- William Fieldhouse
- G.H. Frost
- Paul Hofrichter
- Mike Linaker
- Larry Lind
- David North
- Ron Renauld
- Rod Pennington
- Larry Powell
- Chuck Rogers
- Ken Rose
- C.J. Shiao
- Sgt. Nik Uhernik

== Series listing ==
Able Team appeared in 51 regular titles during the run of the series.

1. Tower of Terror
2. The Hostaged Island
3. Texas Showdown
4. Amazon Slaughter
5. Cairo Countdown
6. Warlord of Azatlan
7. Justice by Fire
8. Army of Devils
9. Kill School
10. Royal Flush
11. Five Rings of Fire
12. Deathbites
13. Scorched Earth
14. Into the Maze
15. They Came to Kill
16. Rain of Doom
17. Fire and Maneuver
18. Tech War
19. Ironman
20. Shot to Hell
21. Death Strike
22. The World War III Game
23. Fall Back and Kill
24. Blood Gambit
25. Hard Kill
26. The Iron God
27. Cajun Angel
28. Miami Crush
29. Death Ride
30. Hit and Run
31. Ghost Train
32. Firecross
33. Cowboy's Revenge
34. Clear Shot
35. Strike Force
36. Final Run
37. Red Menace
38. Cold Steel
39. Death Code
40. Blood Mark
41. White Fire
42. Dead Zone
43. Kill Orbit
44. Night Heat
45. Lethal Trade
46. Counterblow
47. Shadow Warriors
48. Cult War
49. Dueling Missiles
50. Death Hunt
51. Skinwalker

As well, they appeared in a number of other books. They had two "Super Able Team" books and appeared in all three of the "Heroes" anthologies released by Gold Eagle, which featured short adventures of both Able Team and Phoenix Force.

- Mean Streets (Super Able Team #1)
- Hostile Fire (Super Able Team #2)
- Razorback (Heroes I)
- Death Lash (Heroes II)
- Secret Justice (Heroes III)

== See also ==
- Death Merchant
- The Destroyer
- Nick Carter-Killmaster
