= Nicholas Cain =

American novelist

Nicholas Cain is a private investigator and author of action novels.

== Military career ==
Cain was born and raised in the Rocky Mountains of Colorado. In 1972, despite a relatively high draft number of 363, he volunteered for the Vietnam War, where he served as a US Army military policeman until 1973. He also served as an MP in Aurora, Colorado at the Fitzsimons Army Medical Center, then in Thailand with the 281st MPs at Amphoe Sattahip/Vayama, and in South Korea with the 110th MPs at Daejeon. In 1975, he left with an honorable military discharge and the rank of sergeant.

He returned to Colorado where he became a state trooper in north metro Denver and subsequently a city cop in suburban Thornton, Colorado. During his ten years as a police officer, he worked a variety of assignments, yet none stayed with him as much as his tour of duty in Vietnam.

== Books ==
Cain's experiences in Vietnam inspired him to write a non-fiction manuscript entitled Saigon Alley. After nearly every publisher in New York City rejected the proposed book, Zebra Books' Michael Seidman (coincidentally also an ex-MP) offered Cain a four-book contract, but only if he would fictionalize his manuscript and increase the sex and violence. This ultimately became the cult classic Saigon Commandos series, which, beginning in 1983, ran to 12 books. Book 9 of this series was made into a film, called Saigon Commandos by Roger Corman's Concorde Studios.

Cain went on to write the War Dogs series for Zebra, using the pseudonym Nik Uhernik. He then wrote the first eight books in Ballantine Books' Chopper-1 series, under the pseudonym Jack Hawkins. He also penned three books in the Able Team series, which was a spin-off of the immensely popular Mack Bolan Exceutioner novels.

He wrote the final installment in the Vietnam Ground Zero series, (published as Zebra Cube in the Heroes trilogy), using the pseudonym Robert Baxter. then created and wrote the six-book series Little Saigon (only four books of which were published by Lynx Books of New York before Lynx folded).

== Private investigator ==
After writing over 30 books, Cain pulled the plug on his word processor in 1990 and became a private investigator in Los Angeles. He began teaching the Learning Annex's Course #523: How To Get Anything on Anybody in the mid-1990s, and wrote two investigative manuals to go along with it: Trick Questions (And Other Trade Secrets of an L.A. County P.I.) and So You Wanna Be A Private Eye.
