= Jon Guenther =

American novelist

- Born: 1968 (age 57–58); Illinois, U.S.
- Occupation: Author
- Writing career
- Years active: 1997–2019

Jon Guenther (born 1968) is an American author of nearly forty novels in a variety of genres. In addition to books under his own name, he has written many novels in The Executioner series created by Don Pendleton about the fictional character Mack Bolan. He is also creator of the Christian Pulp brand and genre.

In addition to his credits as a prolific author, he is a former reviewer of science fiction and fantasy novels at SFRevu, and programming books on various subjects. He has also appeared as a speaker at venues throughout the United States on topics ranging from writing to programming.

In 2019, Jon Guenther announced his retirement as a "professional author" to focus solely on programming, but admits he continues to write and self-publish in his spare time as a creative endeavor.

== Bibliography ==
=== Chaser Series ===
- Chaser (unabridged audio, 1998)
- Chaser's Return (unabridged audio, 1999)
- Chaser (TPB, 2010)
- Chaser's Return (TPB, 2012)

=== Standalone Novels ===
- Soul Runner: A Novel of High Adventure (TPB, 2009)
- Finding Faith (TPB, 2014)
