= Mack Bolan =

- The Executioner character
- First appearance: The Executioner #1: War Against the Mafia (1969)
- Created by: Don Pendleton

In-universe information
- Gender: Male
- Occupation: Vigilante
- Nationality: American

Mack Bolan, alias The Executioner, is a fictional character who has been serialized in 631 novels with sales of more than 200 million books. Created by Don Pendleton, Bolan made his first appearance on the printed page in The Executioner #1: War Against the Mafia (1969). Pendleton wrote 37 other novels featuring Bolan, often referred to as the "Mafia Wars". In 1980, Pendleton sold his rights to the character to Gold Eagle, which hired a number of ghostwriters to continue publishing Bolan monthly, to satisfy reader demand worldwide. Pendleton remained credited as the sole author and supervised these new adventures, which took the Bolan character all over the world fighting terrorism. This new series of books featured Bolan as a principled warrior fighting larger-than-life adversaries in the spirit of a tougher, American version of James Bond. The demand for the books continued, and Gold Eagle began releasing as many as 15 titles annually. In 2014, more than a dozen Mack Bolan novels were being published every year worldwide by Gold Eagle Books, a division of Harlequin Books. Additionally, Bolan was "spun off" into several new adventure book series which also carried the Mack Bolan/Don Pendleton names.

== Fictional character biography ==
When asked his name and rank in Colorado Kill Zone, he replied, "Bolan, Mack Samuel, Master Sergeant". Bolan, born in 1939 and raised in Pittsfield, Massachusetts, is of Welsh-Polish heritage and is the eldest of the three children of steelworker Samuel Bolan and his wife, Elsa. Bolan enlisted in the Army at age 18 and served two tours of duty in Vietnam as a Green Beret, though newer novels do not make any reference to this as it makes him seem too old.

Bolan became an expert sniper with over 90 kills to his record, earning him the nickname "The Executioner". For all his lethal capability, Bolan was deeply compassionate and became known as "Sgt. Mercy", because of the aid he often gave to Vietnamese civilians and others who needed help.

During his service in the Vietnam War, Bolan became highly adept at penetration and intelligence gathering, guerrilla warfare and became a skilled armorer.

During Bolan's second tour, his father suffered a heart attack that forced him to leave his job at the steel mill. Unable to work, with bills piling up, Bolan's father was forced to borrow money from Triangle Industrial Finance ("TIF"), a savings-and-loan outfit known around town as a loansharking operation controlled by the family of Don Sergio Frenchi, the godfather of the Mafia in western Massachusetts. The people at TIF caused the elder Bolan countless problems with their payment demands. On one occasion, their enforcers dislocated his arm as punishment for missing one loan payment, warning him that the same arm would be broken if he missed another.

Mack Bolan's younger sister, Cindy Bolan, was worried about their father's safety and had secretly paid the officers at TIF a visit, in an attempt to persuade them to leave her father alone and allow her to repay the loan. In her first attempt, she turned in $35 a week, money she made from an after school job. When it became insufficient, TIF "suggested" she become a prostitute.

Johnny Bolan, Mack's younger brother, learned about it from a schoolmate who taunted him about it, resulting in a fight that Johnny lost. When Johnny found Cindy servicing a client in a motel room, he blew the whistle to his father ... an act that resulted in the elder Bolan's striking him. When Cindy's father confronted her, she admitted to her work, expressing her fear for his health and welfare.

For Sam Bolan, it was too much. He snapped and turned a Smith & Wesson .45 on his family and then himself. Johnny Bolan was the only survivor of the murder-suicide.

A few days later, Bolan was notified of the tragedy by an Army chaplain and took emergency leave to visit his brother. After Johnny told him the whole story, Bolan broke into a sportsman's shop and took a high-powered Marlin .444, a deluxe scope, some targets, and several boxes of ammunition, leaving an envelope of money to cover the "purchase". He would use the rifle to kill the TIF loansharks, marking the beginning of his war against the Mafia.

=== Stony Man ===
After 38 bloody campaigns against the Mafia, Bolan became the leader of the Stony Man organization in the "Super Bolan" book titled Stony Man Doctrine, working with Able Team, Phoenix Force, Hal Brognola, April Rose, Aaron (The Bear) Kurtzman, and Jack Grimaldi.

=== War against the Mafia and the KGB ===
After the KGB attempted to destroy Stony Man and the death of April Rose, Bolan left the organization to resume his solo war against evil, this time adding the KGB to his hit list. It was during this war that he was framed by the mob for the murder of a prostitute in McLary County, Texas, resulting in Bolan's being tried for his extra-legal activities.

=== Current activities ===
Bolan currently works on his own at arm's length from the clandestine agency Stony Man. He occasionally takes missions from Stony Man's director and personal friend, Hal Brognola, and the President of the United States. Frequently, Bolan returns to Stony Man to lead the agency on missions.

=== Personal life ===
Bolan has been in love only twice. His first lover was Valentina "Val" Querente, whom he met when he first went up against the mob. He broke off their relationship after she and Johnny Bolan had been kidnapped.

His second love was federal agent April Rose, whom he met during the first of his final campaigns against the Mafia. He holds his current lover, Barbara Price, at arm's length out of fear she, like Val and April, will be threatened, harmed, or killed.

In each book, Bolan usually has sex with a different woman. He prefers the gutsy type who are not apt to run away when shot at, which explains his deep affection for Querente, federal agent Toby Ranger, and April Rose. In one novel, a woman with whom he was working claimed that he liked his women "barefoot, pregnant and in the kitchen". Bolan replied, "No, I like them alive".

In his spare time, he likes extreme sports, such as canoeing several rivers in flood stage. He typically likes to spend his spare time with Barbara Price.

He is very literate. This is shown at the beginning of each novel, where Bolan gives his interpretation/response to a quote from a book, author, or famous person. He frequently reads Miguel de Cervantes' masterwork Don Quixote.

==== Languages ====
In addition to his native language, English, Bolan speaks Arabic, Spanish, Russian, and passable German, and can understand many other languages.

==== Weapons ====
Throughout his war against the Mafia, Bolan used a variety of weapons. His primary long gun was the .460 Weatherby Mark V, which he obtained from Nicholas "Nick Trigger" Woods, a top Mafia hitman sent to kill him. For a sidearm, he used a silenced Beretta Brigadier, which he nicknamed "Belle" and carried in a vertical shoulder rig. His trademark weapon was "Big Thunder", a stainless steel .44 AutoMag that he usually wore on his hip.

The Brigadier and AutoMag have since been supplanted by the current favorites, the Beretta 93R and .44 Magnum Desert Eagle, though Bolan has demonstrated facility with any pistol or rifle he comes across, and often carries a knife.

== Mack Bolan books ==
Mack Bolan books are currently divided into three series: Executioner ("Mack Bolan"), Super Bolan, and Stony Man.

- Both the Executioner and Super Bolan series detail Bolan's exploits. Executioner is the original series that was started by Don Pendelton in 1969; 453 books were published in this series between 1969 and 2017 (these novels being typically 180 pages long). (Several later e-books may also exist from 2017 to 2020.)
- The "Super Bolan" series was started in 1983 by World Wide Library (a division of Harlequin Books) and were released about every other month; 178 books were published in this series between 1983 and 2015 (these novels being typically 310 pages long).
- The Stony Man series details the exploits of the two action teams at Stony Man: Able Team and Phoenix Force. In 1991, Able Team and Phoenix Force were discontinued, and Gold Eagle merged them into one series, Stony Man. There were 51 "Able Team" novels plus two "Super Able Team" special editions, while "Phoenix Force" consisted of 51 novels plus four "Super Phoenix Force" specials. (These were followed by 140 Stony Man novels, which continued until 2015.)

In France, a new spin-off series, Kira B., featuring Mack Bolan's "daughter" Kira, was introduced by the publisher Vauvenargues, in 2012. Written under the pen name Steven Belly, the series follows the adventures of Kira, a young woman who appeared in L'Exécuteur nº300: Le réseau Phénix, where she manipulated Mack Bolan to come out of retirement to fight against cyber-criminals. Since then, she has helped her "father" in his fight against crime and now is the heroine of her own, eponymous series, which includes the following titles:

1. Kira 1: Ondes de Choc dans l'Oregon (2012, Shockwaves in Oregon)
2. Kira 2: L'Aigle de Brandebourg (2013, Brandeburger Eagle)
3. Kira 3: Neige de sang sur Oslo (2013)
4. Kira 4: Crisis (2013)
5. Kira 5: La Quadrature sibérienne (2013)

A publishing deal was made for e-book versions of Don Pendleton's original 37-volume series with Open Road Media. Pendleton's only Mack Bolan short story, "Willing to Kill", written in 1978, is now in print. Linda Pendleton also issued a hardcover history of the Executioner, celebrating the character's 50th Anniversary in 2019, called The Executioner: Don Pendleton Creates Mack Bolan.

== Authors ==
Here is a comprehensive list of authors who have at one point in time written a Mack Bolan/Executioner novel or a spin-off novel for the Able Team, Phoenix Force, or Stony Man series.

- Tom Arnett
- Andy Boot
- Michael A. Black
- Nicholas Cain
- E. Richard Churchill
- Chet Cunningham
- Les Danforth
- Kent Delaney
- Mark Ellis
- William Fieldhouse
- G. H. Frost
- Carl Furst
- Jack Garside
- Paul Glen
- Roland Green
- Jon Guenther
- Aaron Hill
- Paul Hofrichter
- Robert Hoskins
- Tom Jagninski
- Michael W. Kasner
- Steven Krauzer
- Peter Leslie
- Michael Linaker
- Larry Lind
- James Lord
- Dan Marlowe
- Charlie McDade
- Mike McQuay
- Stephen Mertz
- Nathan Meyer
- Gerald Addison Montgomery
- Will Murray
- Patrick Neary
- Judy Newton
- Michael Newton
- David North
- Raymond Obstfeld
- Mel Odom
- L. R. Payne
- Don Pendleton
- Rod Pennington
- Alan Philipson
- Nick Pollotta
- Larry Powell
- Rick Price
- Rich Rainey
- Thomas Ramirez
- Kevin Randall
- Ron Renauld
- David L. Robbins
- Chuck Rogers (1985–1987)
- Chuck Rogers (1996–present)
- Patrick F. Rogers
- Ken Rose
- Mark Sadler
- Kirk Sanson
- Dan Schmidt
- C.J. Shiao
- Wiley Slade
- Tim Somheil
- Gayle Stone
- Dan Streib
- Rex Swenson
- Timothy Tresslar
- Nik Uhernik
- Jerry VanCook
- David Wade
- Saul Wernick
- Glenn D. Williams

== In other media ==
In 1985, Gesture Press published Canadian poet Mark Laba's The Mack Bolan Poems, inspired by Pendleton's Jersey Guns.

In 1993, Innovation Publishing released a three-issue comic book miniseries, Mack Bolan: The Executioner.

In 2008, a five-issue comic book miniseries was released by IDW Publishing titled Don Pendleton's The Executioner: The Devil's Tools, starring Mack Bolan. Issues were released on a monthly basis. It was written by Doug Wojtowicz and illustrated by SI. Gallant.

It was announced in August 2014 that Hollywood producer and screenwriter Shane Salerno had optioned the Executioner Mack Bolan series of action/adventure novels for a film franchise, with Bradley Cooper portraying Bolan in a film version of the book series with Todd Phillips attached as director, but it seems as if the project was abandoned.

The 1986 action movie Jake Speed is a direct takeoff-parody of Mack Bolan, who (as a character) is mentioned several times. Several Bolan books are shown alongside the Jake Speed books, in which Wayne Crawford plays the titular character, a real life version of a fictional character. In one scene, the back of a Bolan book has words changed to be a Jake Speed book.

== General and cited references ==
- Young, William Henry (1996). A Study of Action-Adventure Fiction: The Executioner and Mack Bolan. Edwin Mellen Press. ISBN 978-0-7734-8918-9.
