= Steven Krauzer =

American novelist

Steven Krauzer was a ghostwriter for The Executioner series featuring Mack Bolan. He wrote a total of 4 books between 1982 and 1983. Krauzer was preceded by Saul Wernick and was followed by Michael Newton.

== The Executioner ==
- #40: Double Crossfire
- #44: Terrorist Summit
- #47: Renegade Agent
- #50: Brothers in Blood
