= Stephen Mertz =

American fiction author (born 1947)

- Born: 1947 (age 78–79); United States
- Died: November 6, 2024; Cochise County, Arizona, USA
- Occupation: Writer
- Writing career
- Pen name: Stephen Brett, Don Pendleton, Jack Buchanan, Jim Case, Cliff Banks
- Genres: Mystery, Thriller, Adventure

Stephen Mertz (born 1947) is an American fiction author best known for thriller novels.

His novels have been critical. Booklist called Nightwind, “fast-paced...a white-knuckle read.” Ellery Queen's Mystery Magazine labeled Mertz, “an action specialist.” Edgar-winner Joe R. Lansdale supplied this career assessment: “Stephen Mertz writes a hard-edged, fast-paced thriller for those who like their tales straight and sharp and full of dark surprise,” while Booklist had this to say about The Korean Intercept: "Fans of political thrillers will relish this high-action tale. An adrenaline rush!” Ed Gorman wrote, “Stephen Mertz just keeps on getting better, each novel better in story and style.”

Early in his career, he was a prolific writer of paperback originals under a variety of pseudonyms. His work on Don Pendleton's Mack Bolan series is regarded by fans as some of the best in that series. He also created the Mark Stone: MIA Hunter and Cody's Army series, written under the pseudonyms Jack Buchanan and Jim Case, respectively.

== Bibliography ==
=== Novels ===
- Some Die Hard (1979, as Stephen Brett)
- The Vampire Chase (1979, as Stephen Brett)
- Blood Red Sun (1989)
- Tunnel Rats (1989, as Cliff Banks)
- Tunnel Rats: Mud and Blood (1990, as Cliff Banks)
- Sudden Death (1995)
- Night Wind (2002)
- Fade to Tomorrow (2004)
- Devil Creek (2004)
- The Korean Intercept (2005)
- Dragon Games (Five Star Books, 2010)
- Hank & Muddy (Perfect Crime Books, 2011)
- The Castro Directive (Crossroad Press, 2013)
- Blaze! (Rough Edges Press, 2015)

==== The Executioner Series (as Don Pendleton) ====
- The Iranian Hit #42 (1982)
- Return to Vietnam #43 (1982)
- The Libya Connection #48 (1982)
- Tuscany Terror #52 (1983)
- Day of Mourning #62 (1984)
- Dead Man Running #64 (1984)
- Beirut Payback #67 (1984)
- Appointment in Kabul #73 (1985)
- Teheran Wipeout #76 (1985)
- Dirty War (SuperBolan #4) (1985)
- Moscow Massacre #92 (1986)
- Save the Children #94 (1986)

==== Cody's Army Series (as Jim Case) ====
- Cody's Army (1986)
- Assault into Libya (1986)
- Philippine Hardpunch (1987)
- Belfast Blitz (1987)
- D.C. Firestike (1987)
- Hellfire in Haiti (1988)
- Sword of the Prophet (1988)
