= The Executioner (book series) =

Action-adventure series novel series

- Cover sample of The Executioner #1: War Against the Mafia
- Author: Don Pendleton
- Language: English
- Genre: Action
- Publisher: Pinnacle (1969–1980); Gold Eagle (1981–present)
- Publication date: 1969–present
- Publication place: United States
- Media type: Print (Paperback)
- Pages: 188 (1981–1986); 220 (1987–2008); 192 (2008–present)

The Executioner (a.k.a. Mack Bolan) is a monthly men's action-adventure paperback book series (published from 1969–2020) following the exploits of the character Mack Bolan and his wars against organized crime and international terrorism. The series has sold more than 200 million copies since its 1969 debut installment, War Against the Mafia.

The regular series includes 464 novels (as of December 2020 when the series ended). Every other month, the Executioner series was complemented by the release of a Super Bolan, which were twice the length of a standard Executioner novel. There were 178 "Super Bolans" (as of December 2015 when that series ended).

The Executioner was created and initially written by American author Don Pendleton, who penned 37 of the original 38 Bolan novels (he did not write #16). In 1980, Pendleton licensed the rights to Gold Eagle and was succeeded by a collective of ghostwriters. Some Pinnacle printings in the middle of Pendleton's original series carried a photo and brief article on the author, showing that Pendleton was not just a "house name".

Pinnacle Books was bought by Kensington Publishing (Zebra Books and others) and retained the rights to the original 38 novels; they were briefly reissued in the late 1980s-early 1990s.

After Don Pendleton's passing in 1995, his widow Linda ensured that the 37 books penned by her husband remained in circulation. This is still the case in 2025, as e-books. However since Linda Pendleton's death in late 2021, the publishing future of the series remains uncertain.

Since its inception in 1969, The Executioner series has spawned several spin-off series including Able Team (1982), Phoenix Force (1982), and Stony Man (the series into which Able Team and Phoenix Force were eventually merged in 1991). The Stony Man series began in 1991 with "Stony Man" #2 (since the first "Stony Man" novel was published as a one-shot back in 1983, titled "Stony Man Doctrine" which is also regarded as the first "Super Bolan" novel).

== Spinoff series ==
In the Mack Bolan universe Stony Man is an anti-terrorist organization, with two teams—Able Team and Phoenix Force. Each had its own series of books from 1982 until 1991, when the publisher combined both series into Stony Man.

In addition, the Super Bolan series began in 1985, a separate series of Mack Bolan adventures that ran concurrently with the regular monthly series. These books were double the size of a regular Executioner novel and were released every other month. Technically the first "Super Bolan" book was Stony Man Doctrine (1983), which is also considered the first book in the Stony Man series. The Super Bolans then commenced with Book #2 in 1985 and ran a total of 178 novels.

In France, a new spin-off series, Kira B., featuring Mack Bolan's "daughter" Kira, was introduced by the publisher Vauvenargues, in 2012. Written under the pen name Steven Belly, the series follows the adventures of Kira, a young woman who appeared in L'Exécuteur nº300: Le réseau Phénix, where she manipulated Mack Bolan to come out of retirement to fight against cyber-criminals. Since then, she has helped her "father" in his fight against crime in her own, eponymous series, which ran for five books.

There were 464 novels in the original Executioner series (1969–2020), plus the following spinoff series:

#	Series	Number of Novels	Years Active
1	Able Team	51 + 2 Super Able Teams	1982–1991
2	Phoenix Force	51 + 4 Super Phoenix Forces	1982–1991
3	Stony Man	140	1983, 1991–2015
4	Super Bolan	178	1983, 1985–2015
4	Kira B.	5	2012–2013
5	SOBs (Jack Hild)	33 + 5 Super SOBs	1983–1990

== The Executioner Mystery Magazine ==
In 1975, Leonard J. Ackerman Productions produced Don Pendleton's The Executioner Mystery Magazine, a digest-sized, pulp magazine anthology series along the same lines as the Alfred Hitchcock Mystery Magazine. The magazine had little connection to the Mack Bolan books save for the occasional story related to the Mafia. The magazine ran for only four issues, ending in August 1975, with the final issue titled simply The Executioner Mystery Magazine.

== Other media ==
=== Audio books ===
Select Executioner titles were distributed on audiocassette by DH Audio through #241, although the company was dissolved in Fall 2001. These abridged versions of the books, read by Richard Rohan performing multiple voices, ran about 3 hours. Stony Man Doctrine was also published as an audio cassette tape.

The first three books in the Executioner series in audio format were published by Books in Motion as cassette tapes.

Cutting Edge Audio published the Executioner & Stony Man series on audio, starting in October 2004 and beginning with Executioner 301 Blast Radius and Stony Man 68 Outbreak. They were available throughout North America and online via Cuttingaudio.com. The company had no plans for selling them through regular retail outlets. They stopped publishing them in 2006.

=== Movie screenplay ===
Joseph E. Levine contracted Richard Maibaum in 1972 to write a screenplay, based on the fifth and sixth volumes, Continental Contract and Assault on Soho. Some Pinnacle printings at the time had a strapline in a corner of the cover with "Soon to be a major motion picture from Avco-Embassy."

A later attempt to adapt The Executioner to the screen by William Friedkin was to star Sylvester Stallone and Cynthia Rothrock, but the production was scrapped.

It was announced in August 2014, that Shane Salerno, Hollywood producer and screenwriter, had acquired the rights to turn the novel series into a film franchise. Four days later, Deadline reported that Warner Bros. had acquired the film rights from Salerno, hoping to sign Bradley Cooper to star as Bolan and Todd Phillips to direct. Salerno would write the script and produce.

=== Comics ===
Mack Bolan: The Executioner was a comic book adaptation of War Against the Mafia adapted by Don and Linda Pendleton, published in 1993 by Innovation Publishing with art by Sandu Florea. Intended to run four issues, the final installment was not published due to Innovation closing.

The Executioner: Death Squad was adapted by Linda Pendleton with art by Sandu Florea. It was a 128-page black and white comic, published in 1996 by Vivid Comics.

The Executioner was adapted into a five-part comic book series by IDW, written by Doug Wojtowicz and illustrated by S. I. Gallant. It was reissued as the graphic novel Don Pendleton's The Executioner: The Devil's Tool in November 2008. The reissued version contained an introduction by Linda Pendleton, "Don Pendleton's Creation of Mack Bolan, The Executioner".

=== Podcast ===
The Executioner books and spin-offs are featured on the August 5, 2019 episode of the Paperback Warrior podcast. The show's hosts, Eric Compton and Tom Simon, discuss the series' origins including its impact on popular culture. Additionally, the show spotlights key authors that contributed to the series and its spin-offs. During that episode, Eric Compton reviews Executioner #88 Baltimore Trackdown by Chet Cunningham.

== Series listing ==
- 001: War Against the Mafia
- 002: Death Squad
- 003: Battle Mask
- 004: Miami Massacre
- 005: Continental Contract
- 006: Assault on Soho
- 007: Nightmare in New York
- 008: Chicago Wipeout
- 009: Vegas Vendetta
- 010: Caribbean Kill
- 011: California Hit
- 012: Boston Blitz
- 013: Washington I.O.U.
- 014: San Diego Siege
- 015: Panic in Philly
- 016: Sicilian Slaughter (written by "Jim Peterson," a pseudonym for William Crawford)
- 017: Jersey Guns
- 018: Texas Storm
- 019: Detroit Deathwatch
- 020: New Orleans Knockout
- 021: Firebase Seattle
- 022: Hawaiian Hellground
- 023: St. Louis Showdown
- 024: Canadian Crisis
- 025: Colorado Kill-Zone
- 026: Acapulco Rampage
- 027: Dixie Convoy
- 028: Savage Fire
- The Executioner's War Book (not a novel, but an overview of the series to this point, with descriptions and schematic drawings of Bolan's weapons and War Wagon, lists of characters, excerpts from the novels, and letters from fans with Pendleton's original return mail replies)
- 029: Command Strike
- 030: Cleveland Pipeline
- 031: Arizona Ambush
- 032: Tennessee Smash
- 033: Monday's Mob
- The Great American Detective Anthology (contains the Mack Bolan short story "Willing to Kill")
- 034: Terrible Tuesday
- 035: Wednesday's Wrath
- 036: Thermal Thursday
- 037: Friday's Feast
- 038: Satan's Sabbath (Pendleton's last)
- 039: The New War (series was taken over at this point by a team of ghost writers as "Don Pendleton's Mack Bolan")
- 040: Double Crossfire
- 041: The Violent Streets
- 042: The Iranian Hit (written by Stephen Mertz)
- 043: Return to Vietnam (written by Stephen Mertz)
- 044: Terrorist Summit
- 045: Paramilitary Plot
- 046: Bloodsport
- 047: Renegade Agent
- 048: The Libya Connection (written by Stephen Mertz)
- 049: Doomsday Disciples
- 050: Brothers in Blood
- 051: Vulture's Vengeance
- 052: Tuscany Terror (written by Stephen Mertz)
- 053: The Invisible Assassins
- 054: Mountain Rampage
- 055: Paradine's Gauntlet
- 056: Island Deathtrap
- 057: Flesh Wounds
- 058: Ambush on Blood River
- 059: Crude Kill
- 060: Sold for Slaughter
- 061: Tiger War
- 062: Day of Mourning (written by Stephen Mertz)
- 063: The New War Book (not a novel, but an overview of the series post-Pinnacle)
- 064: Dead Man Running (written by Stephen Mertz)
- 065: Cambodia Clash
- 066: Orbiting Omega
- 067: Beirut Payback (written by Stephen Mertz)
- 068: Prairie Fire
- 069: Skysweeper
- 070: Ice Cold Kill
- 071: Blood Dues
- 072: Hellbinder
- 073: Appointment in Kabul (written by Stephen Mertz)
- 074: Savannah Swingsaw
- 075: The Bone Yard
- 076: Teheran Wipeout (written by Stephen Mertz)
- 077: Hollywood Hell
- 078: Death Games
- 079: Council of Kings
- 080: Running Hot
- 081: Shock Waves
- 082: Hammerhead Reef
- 083: Missouri Deathwatch
- 084: Fastburn
- 085: Sunscream
- 086: Hell's Gate
- 087: Hellfire Crusade
- 088: Baltimore Trackdown
- 089: Defenders and Believers
- 090: Blood Heat Zero
- 091: The Trial
- 092: Moscow Massacre (written by Stephen Mertz)
- 093: The Fire Eaters
- 094: Save the Children (written by Stephen Mertz)
- 095: Blood and Thunder
- 096: Death Has a Name
- 097: Meltdown
- 098: Black Dice
- 099: Code of Dishonor
- 100: Blood Testament
- 101: Eternal Triangle
- 102: Split Image
- 103: Assault on Rome
- 104: Devil's Horn
- 105: Countdown to Chaos
- 106: Run to Ground
- 107: American Nightmare
- 108: Time to Kill
- 109: Hong Kong Hit List
- 110: Trojan Horse
- 111: The Fiery Cross
- 112: Blood of the Lion
- 113: Vietnam Fallout
- 114: Cold Judgment
- 115: Circle of Steel
- 116: The Killing Urge
- 117: Vendetta in Venice
- 118: Warrior's Revenge
- 119: Line of Fire
- 120: Border Sweep
- 121: Twisted Path
- 122: Desert Strike
- 123: War Born
- 124: Night Kill
- 125: Dead Man's Tale
- 126: Death Wind
- 127: Kill Zone
- 128: Sudan Slaughter
- 129: Haitian Hit
- 130: Dead Line
- 131: Ice Wolf
- 132: The Big Kill
- 133: Blood Run
- 134: White Line War
- 135: Devil Force
- 136: Down and Dirty
- 137: Battle Lines
- 138: Kill Trap
- 139: Cutting Edge
- 140: Wild Card
- 141: Direct Hit
- 142: Fatal Error
- 143: Helldust Cruise
- 144: Whipsaw
- 145: Chicago Payoff
- 146: Deadly Tactics
- 147: Payback Game
- 148: Deep and Swift
- 149: Blood Rules (The Medellin Trilogy #1)
- 150: Death Load
- 151: Message to Medellin (The Medellin Trilogy #3)
- 152: Combat Stretch
- 153: Firebase Florida
- 154: Night Hit
- 155: Hawaiian Heat
- 156: Phantom Force
- 157: Cayman Strike
- 158: Firing Line
- 159: Steel and Flame
- 160: Storm Warning (Storm Trilogy #1)
- 161: Eye of the Storm (Storm Trilogy #2)
- 162: Colors of Hell
- 163: Warrior's Edge
- 164: Death Trail
- 165: Fire Sweep
- 166: Assassin's Creed
- 167: Double Action
- 168: Blood Price
- 169: White Heat
- 170: Baja Blitz
- 171: Deadly Force
- 172: Fast Strike
- 173: Capital Hit
- 174: Battle Plan (Freedom Trilogy #1)
- 175: Battle Ground (Freedom Trilogy #2)
- 176: Ransom Run
- 177: Evil Code
- 178: Black Hand
- 179: War Hammer
- 180: Force Down
- 181: Shifting Target
- 182: Lethal Agent
- 183: Clean Sweep
- 184: Death Warrant
- 185: Sudden Fury
- 186: Fire Burst (Terror Trilogy #1)
- 187: Cleansing Flame (Terror Trilogy #2)
- 188: War Paint
- 189: Wellfire
- 190: Killing Range
- 191: Extreme Force
- 192: Maximum Impact
- 193: Hostile Action
- 194: Deadly Contest
- 195: Select Fire (Arms Trilogy #1)
- 196: Triburst (Arms Trilogy #2)
- 197: Armed Force (Arms Trilogy #3)
- 198: Shoot Down
- 199: Rogue Agent
- 200: Crisis Point
- 201: Prime Target
- 202: Combat Zone
- 203: Hard Contact
- 204: Rescue Run
- 205: Hell Road
- 206: Hunting Cry
- 207: Freedom Strike
- 208: Death Whisper
- 209: Asian Crucible
- 210: Fire Lash (Red Dragon Trilogy #1)
- 211: Steel Claws (Red Dragon Trilogy #2)
- 212: Ride the Beast (Red Dragon Trilogy #3)
- 213: Blood Harvest
- 214: Fission Fury
- 215: Fire Hammer
- 216: Death Force
- 217: Fight or Die
- 218: End Game
- 219: Terror Intent
- 220: Tiger Stalk
- 221: Blood and Fire
- 222: Patriot Gambit (American Trilogy #1)
- 223: Hour of Conflict (American Trilogy #2)
- 224: Call to Arms (American Trilogy #3)
- 225: Body Armor
- 226: Red Horse
- 227: Blood Circle
- 228: Terminal Option
- 229: Zero Tolerance
- 230: Deep Attack
- 231: Slaughter Squad
- 232: Jackal Hunt
- 233: Tough Justice
- 234: Target Command (Power Trilogy #1)
- 235: Plague Wind (Power Trilogy #2)
- 236: Vengeance Rising (Power Trilogy #3)
- 237: Hellfire Trigger
- 238: Crimson Tide
- 239: Hostile Proximity
- 240: Devil's Guard
- 241: Evil Reborn (The Hydra Trilogy #1)
- 242: Doomsday Conspiracy (The Hydra Trilogy #2)
- 243: Assault Reflex (The Hydra Trilogy #3)
- 244: Judas Kill
- 245: Virtual Destruction
- 246: Blood of the Earth
- 247: Black Dawn Rising
- 248: Rolling Death
- 249: Shadow Target
- 250: Warning Shot (The Border Fire Trilogy #1)
- 251: Kill Radius (The Border Fire Trilogy #2)
- 252: Death Line (The Border Fire Trilogy #3)
- 253: Risk Factor
- 254: Chill Effect
- 255: War Bird
- 256: Point of Impact
- 257: Precision Play
- 258: Target Lock
- 259: Nightfire (Lord of the Seas Trilogy #1)
- 260: Dayhunt (Lord of the Seas Trilogy #2)
- 261: Dawnkill (Lord of the Seas Trilogy #3)
- 262: Trigger Point (COMCON Wars #1)
- 263: Skysniper
- 264: Iron Fist (COMCON Wars #2)
- 265: Freedom Force
- 266: Ultimate Price (COMCON Wars #3)
- 267: Invisible Invader
- 268: Shattered Trust (The Conspiracy Trilogy #1)
- 269: Shifting Shadows (The Conspiracy Trilogy #2)
- 270: Judgment Day (The Conspiracy Trilogy #3)
- 271: Cyberhunt
- 272: Stealth Striker
- 273: Uforce
- 274: Rogue Target
- 275: Crossed Borders
- 276: Leviathan
- 277: Dirty Mission
- 278: Triple Reverse
- 279: Fire Wind
- 280: Fear Rally
- 281: Blood Stone
- 282: Jungle Conflict
- 283: Ring of Retaliation
- 284: Devil's Army (The Doomsday Trilogy #1)
- 285: Final Strike (The Doomsday Trilogy #2)
- 286: Armageddon Exit (The Doomsday Trilogy #3)
- 287: Rogue Warrior
- 288: Arctic Blast
- 289: Vendetta Force
- 290: Pursued
- 291: Blood Trade
- 292: Savage Game
- 293: Death Merchants
- 294: Scorpion Rising
- 295: Hostile Alliance
- 296: Nuclear Game (The Moon Shadow Trilogy #1)
- 297: Deadly Pursuit (The Moon Shadow Trilogy #2)
- 298: Final Play (The Moon Shadow Trilogy #3)
- 299: Dangerous Encounter
- 300: Warrior's Requiem
- 301: Blast Radius
- 302: Shadow Search
- 303: Sea of Terror
- 304: Soviet Specter
- 305: Point Position
- 306: Mercy Mission
- 307: Hard Pursuit
- 308: Into the Fire (OrgCrime Trilogy #1)
- 309: Flames of Fury (OrgCrime Trilogy #2)
- 310: Killing Heat (OrgCrime Trilogy #3)
- 311: Night of the Knives
- 312: Death Gamble
- 313: Lockdown
- 314: Lethal Payload
- 315: Agent of Peril
- 316: Poison Justice
- 317: Hour of Judgement
- 318: Code of Resistance
- 319: Entry Point (The Carnivore Project #1)
- 320: Exit Code (The Carnivore Project #2)
- 321: Suicide Highway
- 322: Time Bomb
- 323: Soft Target
- 324: Terminal Zone
- 325: Edge of Hell
- 326: Blood Tide
- 327: Serpent's Lair
- 328: Triangle of Terror
- 329: Hostile Crossing
- 330: Dual Action
- 331: Assault Force
- 332: Slaughter House
- 333: Aftershock
- 334: Jungle Justice
- 335: Blood Vector
- 336: Homeland Terror
- 337: Tropic Blast
- 338: Nuclear Reaction
- 339: Deadly Contact
- 340: Splinter Cell
- 341: Rebel Force
- 342: Double Play
- 343: Border War
- 344: Primal Law
- 345: Orange Alert
- 346: Vigilante Run
- 347: Dragon's Den
- 348: Carnage Code
- 349: Firestorm
- 350: Volatile Agent
- 351: Hell Night
- 352: Killing Trade
- 353: Black Death Reprise
- 354: Ambush Force
- 355: Outback Assault
- 356: Defense Breach
- 357: Extreme Justice
- 358: Blood Toll
- 359: Desperate Passage
- 360: Mission to Burma
- 361: Final Resort
- 362: Patriot Acts
- 363: Face of Terror
- 364: Hostile Odds
- 365: Collision Course
- 366: Pele's Fire
- 367: Loose Cannon
- 368: Crisis Nation
- 369: Dangerous Tides
- 370: Dark Alliance
- 371: Fire Zone
- 372: Lethal Compound
- 373: Code of Honor
- 374: System Corruption
- 375: Salvador Strike
- 376: Frontier Fury
- 377: Desperate Cargo
- 378: Death Run
- 379: Deep Recon
- 380: Silent Threat
- 381: Killing Ground
- 382: Threat Factor
- 383: Raw Fury
- 384: Cartel Clash
- 385: Recovery Force
- 386: Crucial Intercept
- 387: Powder Burn
- 388: Final Coup
- 389: Deadly Command
- 390: Toxic Terrain
- 391: Enemy Agents
- 392: Shadow Hunt
- 393: Stand Down
- 394: Trial by Fire
- 395: Hazard Zone
- 396: Fatal Combat
- 397: Damage Radius
- 398: Battle Cry
- 399: Nuclear Storm
- 400: Blind Justice (March 2012)
- 401: Jungle Hunt (April 2012)
- 402: Rebel Trade (May 2012)
- 403: Line of Honor (June 2012)
- 404: Final Judgement (July 2012)
- 405: Lethal Diversion (August 2012)
- 406: Survival Mission (September 2012)
- 407: Throw Down (October 2012)
- 408: Border Offensive (November 2012)
- 409: Blood Vendetta (December 2012)
- 410: Hostile Force (January 2013)
- 411: Cold Fusion (February 2013)
- 412: Night's Reckoning (March 2013)
- 413: Double Cross (April 2013)
- 414: Prison Code (May 2013)
- 415: Ivory Wave (June 2013)
- 416: Extraction (July 2013)
- 417: Rogue Assault (August 2013)
- 418: Viral Siege (September 2013)
- 419: Sleeping Dragons (October 2013)
- 420: Rebel Blast (November 2013)
- 421: Hard Targets (December 2013)
- 422: Nigeria Meltdown (January 2014)
- 423: Breakout (February 2014)
- 424: Amazon Impunity (March 2014)
- 425: Patriot Strike (April 2014)
- 426: Pirate offensive (May 2014)
- 427: Pacific Creed (June 2014)
- 428: Desert Impact (July 2014)
- 429: Arctic Kill (August 2014)
- 430: Deadly Salvage (September 2014)
- 431: Maximum Chaos (October 2014)
- 432: Slayground (November 2014)
- 433: Point Blank (December 2014)
- 434: Savage Deadlock (January 2015)
- 435: Dragon Key (February 2015)
- 436: Perilous Cargo (March 2015)
- 437: Assassins Tripwire (April 2015)
- 438: The Cartel Hit (May 2015)
- 439: Blood Rites (June 2015)
- 440: Killpath (July 2015)
- 441: Murder Island (August 2015)
- 442: Syrian Rescue (September 2015)
- 443: Uncut Terror (October 2015)
- 444: Dark Savior (November 2015)
- 445: Final Assault (December 2015)
- 446: Kill Squad (March 2016)
- 447: Death Game (June 2016)
- 448: Terrorist Dispatch (September 2016)
- 449: Combat Machines (December 2016)
- 450: Omega Cult (March 2017)
- 451: Fatal Prescription (June 2017)
- 452: Death List (September 2017)
- 453: Rogue Elements (December 2017)
- 454: Enemies Within (2018)
- 455: Chicago Vendetta (2018)
- 456: Thunder Down Under (2018)
- 457: Dying Art (2018)
- 458: Killing Kings (2019)
- 459: Stealth Assassin (2019)
- 460: Lethal Vengeance (2019)
- 461: Cold Fury (2019)
- 462: Cyberthreat (2020)
- 463: Righteous Fear (2020)
- 464: Blood Vortex (2020)

== List of SuperBolan books ==
- 001: Stony Man Doctrine (1983)
- 002: Terminal Velocity (April 1984)
- 003: Resurrection Day (February 1985)
- 004: Dirty War (September 1985)
- 005: Flight 741 (April 1986)
- 006: Dead Easy (September 1986)
- 007: Sudden Death (January 1987)
- 008: Rogue Force (May 1987)
- 009: Tropic Heat (August 1987)
- 010: Fire in the Sky (1988)
- 011: Anvil of Hell (March 1988)
- 012: Flash Point (July 1988)
- 013: Flesh and Blood (October 1988)
- 014: Moving Target (January 1989)
- 015: Tightrope (April 1989)
- 016: Blowout (1989)
- 017: Blood Fever (October 1989)
- 018: Knockdown (February 1990)
- 019: Assault (April 1990)
- 020: Backlash (September 1990)
- 021: Siege (November 1990)
- 022: Blockade (March 1991)
- 023: Evil Kingdom (June 1991)
- 024: Counterblow (August 1991)
- 025: Hardline (November 1991)
- 026: Firepower (February 1992)
- 027: Storm Burst (Storm Trilogy #3) (June 1992)
- 028: Intercept (August 1992)
- 029: Lethal Impact (November 1992)
- 030: Deadfall (Jan 1993)
- 031: Onslaught (May 1993)
- 032: Battle Force (Freedom Trilogy #3) (July 1993)
- 033: Rampage (November 1993)
- 034: Takedown (January 1994)
- 035: Death's Head (March 1994)
- 036: Hellground (June 1994)
- 037: Inferno (Terror Trilogy #3) (July 1994)
- 038: Ambush (September 1994)
- 039: Blood Strike (November 1994)
- 040: Killpoint (January 1995)
- 041: Vendetta (March 1995)
- 042: Stalk Line May 1995)
- 043: Omega Game (August 1995)
- 044: Shock Tactic (September 1995)
- 045: Showdown (November 1995)
- 046: Precision Kill (January 1996)
- 047: Jungle Law (April 1996)
- 048: Dead Center (June 1996)
- 049: Tooth and Claw (August 1996)
- 050: Red Heat (October 1996)
- 051: Thermal Strike (December 1996)
- 052: Day of the Vulture (February 1997)
- 053: Flames of Wrath (March 1997)
- 054: High Aggression (June 1997)
- 055: Code of Bushido (August 1997)
- 056: Terror Spin (October 1997)
- 057: Judgment in Stone (December 1997)
- 058: Rage for Justice (January 1998)
- 059: Rebels and Hostiles (April 1998)
- 060: Ultimate Game (April 1998)
- 061: Blood Feud (June 1998)
- 062: Renegade Force (October 1998)
- 063: Retribution (December 1998)
- 064: Initiation (Four Horsemen Trilogy #1) (February 1999)
- 065: Cloud of Death (Four Horsemen Trilogy #2) (April 1999)
- 066: Termination Point (Four Horsemen Trilogy #3) (June 1999)
- 067: Hellfire Strike (August 1999)
- 068: Code of Conflict (October 1999)
- 069: Vengeance (December 1999)
- 070: Executive Action (February 2000)
- 071: Killsport (April 2000)
- 072: Conflagration (June 2000)
- 073: Storm Front (July 2000)
- 074: War Season (September 2000)
- 075: Evil Alliance (November 2000)
- 076: Scorched Earth (January 2001)
- 077: Deception (March 2001)
- 078: Destiny's Hour (The Tyranny Files #1)(May 2001)
- 079: Power of the Lance (The Tyranny Files #2)(July 2001)
- 080: A Dying Evil (The Tyranny Files #3) (January 2002)
- 081: Deep Treachery (November 2001)
- 082: Warload (January 2002)
- 083: Sworn Enemies (March 2002)
- 084: Dark Truth (May 2002)
- 085: Breakaway (July 2002)
- 086: Blood and Sand (September 2002)
- 087: Caged (November 2002)
- 088: Sleepers (January 2003)
- 089: Strike and Retrieve March (March 2003)
- 090: Age of War (May 2003)
- 091: Line of Control (Frontier Wars duology, #1) (July 2003)
- 092: Breached (Frontier Wars duology, #2) (September 2003)
- 093: Retaliation (Sequel to MB #300) (November 2003)
- 094: Pressure Point (January 2004)
- 095: Silent Running (March 2004)
- 096: Stolen Arrows (May 2004)
- 097: Zero Option (July 2004)
- 098: Predator Paradise (September 2004)
- 099: Circle of Deception (November 2004)
- 100: Devil's Bargain (January 2005)
- 101: False Front (March 2005)
- 102: Lethal Tribute (May 2005)
- 103: Season of Slaughter (July 2005)
- 104: Point of Betrayal (September 2005)
- 105: Ballistic Force (November 2005)
- 106: Renegade (January 2006)
- 107: Survival Reflex (March 2006)
- 108: Path to War (May 2006)
- 109: Blood Dynasty (July 2006)
- 110: Ultimate Stakes (September 2006)
- 111: State of Evil (November 2006)
- 112: Force Lines (January 2007)
- 113: Contagion Option (March 2007)
- 114: Hellfire Code (May 2007)
- 115: War Drums (July 2007)
- 116: Ripple Effect (September 2007)
- 117: Devil's Playground (November 2007)
- 118: The Killing Rule (January 2008)
- 119: Patriot Play (September 2007)
- 120: Appointment in Baghdad (November 2007)
- 121: Havana Five (July 2008)
- 122: The Judas Project (October 2007)
- 123: Plains of Fire (May 2008)
- 124: Colony of Evil (January 2009)
- 125: Hard Passage (March 2009)
- 126: Interception (May 2009)
- 127: Cold War Reprise (July 2009)
- 128: Mission: Apocalypse (September 2009)
- 129: Altered State (October 2009)
- 130: Killing Game (November 2009)
- 131: Diplomacy Directive (January 2010)
- 132: Betrayed (March 2010)
- 133: Sabotage (April 2010)
- 134: Conflict Zone (June 2010)
- 135: Blood Play (July 2010)
- 136: Desert Fallout (September 2010)
- 137: Extraordinary Rendition (October 2010)
- 138: Devil's Mark (December 2010)
- 139: Savage Rule (January 2011)
- 140: Infiltration (March 2011)
- 141: Resurgence (April 2011)
- 142: Kill Shot (June 2011)
- 143: Stealth Sweep (July 2011)
- 144: Grave Mercy (September 2011)
- 145: Treason Play (October 2011)
- 146: Assassin's Code (November 2011)
- 147: Shadow Strike (January 2012)
- 148: Decision Point (March 2012)
- 149: Road of Bones (April 2012)
- 150: Radical Edge (June 2012)
- 151: Fireburst (July 2012)
- 152: Oblivion Pact (September 2012)
- 153: Enemy Arsenal (October 2012)
- 154: State of War (December 2012)
- 155: Ballistic (January 2013)
- 156: Escalation Tactic (March 2013)
- 157: Crisis Diplomacy (April 2013)
- 158: Apocalypse Ark (June 2013)
- 159: Lethal Stakes (July 2013)
- 160: Illicit Supply (September 2013)
- 161: Explosive Demand (October 2013)
- 162: Ground Zero (December 2013)
- 163: Jungle Firestorm (January 2014)
- 164: Terror Ballot (March 2014)
- 165: Death Metal (April 2014)
- 166: Justice Run (June 2014)
- 167: China White (July 2014)
- 168: Payback (September 2014)
- 169: Chain Reaction (October 2014)
- 170: Nightmare Army (December 2014)
- 171: Critical Exposure (January 2015)
- 172: Insurrection (March 2015)
- 173: Armed Response (April 2015)
- 174: Desert Falcons (June 2015)
- 175: Ninja Assault (July 2015)
- 176: Lethal Risk (September 2015)
- 177: Dead Reckoning (October 2015)
- 178: War Everlasting (December 2015)

== List of Kira B. books ==
1. Kira 1: Ondes de Choc dans l'Oregon (2012, Shockwaves in Oregon)
2. Kira 2: L'Aigle de Brandebourg (2013, Brandeburger Eagle)
3. Kira 3: Neige de sang sur Oslo (2013)
4. Kira 4: Crisis (2013)
5. Kira 5: La Quadrature sibérienne (2013)

== See also ==
- Punisher
