= Don Pendleton =

American author

Donald Eugene Pendleton
- Born: December 12, 1927; Little Rock, Arkansas, United States
- Died: October 23, 1995 (aged 67); Sedona, Arizona, United States
- Occupation: Novelist
- Writing career
- Pen name: Dan Britain, Stephan Gregory
- Period: 1969–1995
- Genre: Adventure fiction
- Website: donpendleton.com

Donald Eugene Pendleton (December 12, 1927 – October 23, 1995) was an American author of fiction and non-fiction books, best known for his creation of the fictional character Mack Bolan, which have sold hundreds of millions of copies worldwide since the character's 1969 debut. Since 1980 the Bolan adventure-espionage books were written by other authors under the Pendleton name, and initially under Pendleton's editorial guidance.

Other works include the Joe Copp, Private Eye series of six novels, the Ashton Ford, Psychic Detective series of six novels, and nonfiction books. He collaborated on several books with his wife, Linda Pendleton, including their popular nonfiction book To Dance With Angels. His earlier writings in the 1960s include mysteries, sci-fi, and futuristic books. Pendleton wrote several early books under the pseudonyms Dan Britain and Stephan Gregory.

== Biography ==
Don Pendleton served in the U.S. Navy during World War II, in all theaters of the war. He enlisted fraudulently at the age of 14 in 1941 and his enlistment ended in November 1947. He returned to active duty in 1952, during the Korean War, and served until 1954. He worked as a telegrapher for the Southern Pacific Railroad until 1957, and then as an air traffic control specialist for the Federal Aviation Administration. In the 1960s, he worked for Martin Marietta on the Titan missile program. He later served as an engineering administrator at NASA during the Apollo missions. Pendleton also worked on the C-5 Galaxy transport aircraft program.

At the age of 40 he started a creative writing correspondence course, but never completed it, instead turning in his first manuscript and selling it to a publisher. He is credited with creating the genre of action-adventure novels. He died in 1995, at age 67.

== Writings ==
=== Executioner series (1969–1980) ===
The best-selling Executioner series made the men's action-adventure genre popular in the late 1960s and 1970s, and Pendleton was known as "the father of action adventure", a term he coined. Pendleton's novels revolved around Sergeant Mack Bolan's one-man war against the Mafia, beginning with War Against the Mafia (1969) and ending with Satan's Sabbath (1980), after which Pendleton licensed the rights to his Executioner characters to the Harlequin publishing group.

In the pulp tradition, Pendleton's Mack Bolan, a former United States Army sergeant and Vietnam War veteran, was larger than life, responsible for killing hundreds of mobsters over the course of Pendleton's 38 novels. Like many pulp characters, Bolan left a trademark "calling card" — in his case, a marksman's medal.

After 15 Executioner novels, Pendleton became involved in a legal battle with the publisher, Pinnacle Books, over ownership of the series. Pinnacle had the next entry, The Executioner #16: Sicilian Slaughter, written by William Crawford under the pseudonym Jim Peterson. Pendleton ignored Sicilian Slaughter and wrote The Executioner #17: Jersey Guns, as a sequel to #15, Panic in Philly, under a contract with New American Library. The contract was ultimately voided by the terms of his settlement with Pinnacle and he returned to Pinnacle for 21 more novels.

==== Spin-offs (1980–present) ====
Since 1980, The Executioner, Mack Bolan books and spinoffs - Able Team, Phoenix Force, Stony Man, and Mack Bolan - have been written by Harlequin's team of writers. The Harlequin Gold Eagle books moved Bolan into a fight against terrorism, in whose course he was given the cover identity of "Colonel John Macklin Phoenix." Since 1980, Harlequin has produced new novels, and the writer's name is mentioned on the copyright page as a provider of "a contribution" to the work, pushing the number of Mack Bolan novels into the hundreds; all of them bear the byline Don Pendleton's Mack Bolan.

=== Joe Copp, Private Eye series (1987–1992) ===
Pendleton's other enduring series was the Joe Copp, Private Eye novels, told in the first person by 6'3", 260 lb. Joe Copp, a private investigator. The novels were formulaic hardboiled detective fiction, always opening in the middle of the story, with Copp pursuing a variety of criminals, with the story then flashing back to the beginning to describe how Copp got into his current predicament. The Joe Copp series of six novels often had over-the-top action moments reminiscent of those found in Mickey Spillane's Mike Hammer. The books were first published in hardcover by Donald I. Fine and then released in paperback by Harper.

=== Ashton Ford, Psychic Detective series (1986–1988) ===
The first book of Don Pendleton's Ashton Ford, Psychic Detective series, Ashes to Ashes, was published in 1986 by Warner Books. The Ashton Ford character is a former naval officer and spy, skilled in cryptology and able to see into the future.

== Bibliography ==
=== Mack Bolan novels ===
- War Against The Mafia (1969)
- Death Squad (1969)
- Battle Mask (1970)
- Miami Massacre (1970)
- Continental Contract (1971)
- Assault on Soho (1971)
- Nightmare in New York (1971)
- Chicago Wipe-Out (1971)
- Vegas Vendetta (1971)
- Caribbean Kill (1972)
- California Hit (1972)
- Boston Blitz (1972)
- Washington I.O.U. (1972)
- San Diego Siege (1972)
- Panic In Philly (1973)
- Jersey Guns (1974)
- Texas Storm (1974)
- Detroit Deathwatch (1974)
- New Orleans Knockout (1974)
- Firebase Seattle (1975)
- Hawaiian Hellground (1975)
- Canadian Crisis (1975)
- St. Louis Showdown (1975)
- Colorado Kill-Zone (1976)
- Acapulco Rampage (1976)
- Dixie Convoy (1976)
- Savage Fire (1977)
- Command Strike (1977)
- Cleveland Pipeline (1977)
- Arizona Ambush (1977)
- Tennessee Smash (1978)
- Monday's Mob (1978)
- Terrible Tuesday (1979)
- Wednesday's Wrath (1979)
- Thermal Thursday (1979)
- Friday's Feast (1979)
- Satan's Sabbath (1980)
- The Executioner's War Book (1977) "technical manual" and history of the War against the Mafia

=== Joe Copp, Private Eye novels ===
- Copp for Hire (1987)
- Copp on Fire (1988)
- Copp in Deep (1989)
- Copp in the Dark (1990)
- Copp on Ice (1991)
- Copp in Shock (1992)

=== Ashton Ford, Psychic Detective series ===
- Ashes to Ashes (1986)
- Eye to Eye (1986)
- Mind to Mind (1987)
- Life to Life (1987)
- Heart to Heart (1987)
- Time to Time (1988)

=== Stewart Mann novels (as Stephan Gregory) ===
- Frame Up, Fresno (1960)
- The Insatiables (1967)
- The Sex Goddess (1967)
- Madame Murder (1967)
- The Sexy Saints (1967)
- The Hot One (1967)

=== Other novels ===
- All the Trimmings (as Stephan Gregory) (1966)
- The Huntress (as Stephan Gregory) (1966)
- Color Her Adultress (as Stephan Gregory) (1967)
- All Lovers Accepted (as Stephan Gregory) (1968)
- Revolt (1968)
- The Olympians (1969)
- Cataclysm (1969)
- The Guns of Terra 10 (1970)
- Population Doomsday (1970)
- The Godmakers (as Dan Britain, reissued as Don Pendleton) (1970)
- Civil War II (as Dan Britain, reissued as Don Pendleton) (1971)

=== Nonfiction ===
- A Search for Meaning From the Surface of a Small Planet

=== With Linda Pendleton ===
==== Fiction ====
- Roulette: The Search for the Sunrise Killer
- War Against the Mafia Graphic Comic Novel Adaptation Part 1–3. Part 4 not published.

==== Nonfiction ====
- Whispers from the Soul: The Divine Dance of Consciousness
- The Metaphysics of a Novel: The Inner Workings of a Novel and Novelist
- To Dance With Angels
- The Cosmic Breath: Metaphysical Essays of Don Pendleton

== Adaptations ==
Numerous rumors of upcoming film treatments of the Executioner series have circulated over the years. It was announced August 2014 that Shane Salerno, Hollywood producer and screenwriter, had optioned the Executioner novels for a film franchise.

Spider-Man writer Gerry Conway (who went on to become a show runner on Dick Wolf's Law & Order series) has acknowledged that his creation of Marvel's Punisher character was directly inspired by Pendleton's Executioner, in perhaps the most blatantly direct adaptation (or less politely, "lift") of Pendleton's character. Originally conceived as a villain for the Spider-Man comic book series, the character proved incredibly popular and the costumed version of the Executioner that became a comic book hero has taken Pendleton's original idea to comic-book-ridiculous extremes in comics, cinema and television, all carefully sidestepping any issues of creative ownership.
